= Gola Oda =

District located in eastern Oromia state of Ethiopia

Coordinates: 8°25′N 41°30′E

Gola Oda Gola Odaa (Oromo)
- District
- Location within Ethiopia
- Country: Ethiopia
- Region: (Oromia Region) Oromia
- Zone: East Hararghe
- Time zone: UTC+3 (EAT)

Gola Oda is a District in Oromia, Ethiopia. It was part of former Gola Odana Meyumuluke district what was divided for Gola Oda and Meyumuluke districts. Part of the East Hararghe Zone, Gola Odana Meyumuluke is bordered on the south by the Shebelle River which separates it from the Bale Zone, on the southwest by the Galetti River which separates it from the West Hararghe Zone, on the northwest by Malka Balo, on the north by Bedeno, on the northeast by Girawa, on the east by Fedis, and on the southeast by the Erer River which separates it from the Somali Region. The administrative center of this woreda is Burka.

== Overview ==
The altitude of thisdistrict ranges from 500 to 1930 meters above sea level; Mount Sebero is the highest point. Rivers include the Ramis and Deneba. A survey of the land in this district shows that 3.5% is arable or cultivable, 7.6% pasture, 22.1% forest, and the remaining 66.8% is considered degraded, built-up or otherwise unusable. There are no identified important cash crops.

Industry in the district includes 4 grain mills employing 14 people, as well as 37 registered businesses including wholesalers, retailers and service providers. There were 22 Farmers Associations with 6011 members and no Farmers Service Cooperatives. Gola Odana Myumuluke has only a few kilometers of dry-weather road. About 26.5% of the rural, 18.5% of the urban and 9.4% of the total population have access to drinking water.

== Demographics ==
The 2007 national census reported a total population for this district of 104,440, of whom 53,637 were men and 50,803 were women; 5,555 or 5.32% of its population were urban dwellers. The majority of the inhabitants said they were Muslim, with 99.55% of the population reporting they observed this belief.

Based on figures published by the Central Statistical Agency in 2005, this woreda has an estimated total population of 61,982, of whom 30,150 are men and 31,832 are women; 4,023 or 6.49% of its population are urban dwellers, which is about the same as the Zone average of 6.9%. With an estimated area of 8,827.19 square kilometers, Gola Odana Meyumuluke has an estimated population density of 7 people per square kilometer, which is less than the Zone average of 102.6.

The 1994 national census reported a total population for this district of 175,407, of whom 88,421 were men and 86,986 women; 4,460 or 2.54% of its population were urban dwellers at the time. (This total also includes an estimate for the inhabitants of one rural kebele, which was not counted; it was estimated to have 9,417 inhabitants, of whom 4,738 were men and 4,679 women.) The two largest ethnic groups reported in Gola Odana Meyumuluke were the Oromo (97.74%), and the Amhara (2.18%); all other ethnic groups made up 0.08% of the population. Oromo was spoken as a first language by 97.61%, and 2.35% spoke Amharic; the remaining 0.04% spoke all other primary languages reported. The majority of the inhabitants were Muslim, with 97.31% of the population having reported they practiced that belief, while 2.59% of the population said they professed Ethiopian Orthodox Christianity.
