= Hirna =

Hirna Hirna
- Town
- Location within Ethiopia
- Coordinates: 9°13′N 41°6′E
- Country: Ethiopia
- Region: (Oromia Region) Oromia
- Zone: West Hararghe Zone
- Elevation: 1,763 m (5,784 ft)

Population (2005)
  - Total: 16,726
- Time zone: UTC+3 (EAT)

Hirna (Oromo: Hirna) a town Located in the West Hararghe Zone Of Oromia, Ethiopia it has a latitude and longitude of 9°13′N 41°06′E and an altitude of 1763 meters above sea level. It is the larger of the two towns in Tulo woreda and is inhabited by the Ituu Oromo.

== History ==
The town of Hirna is located on the main highway between Chiro and Haramaya in the Chercher Mountains. This follows an old caravan route between Abyssinia and Emirate of Harar, which was in use during Arthur Rimbaud's residence at Harar city.

In response to king Menelik's orders to occupy the Cherchers, in November 1886 Dejazmach Wolde Gabriel invaded the Emirate of Harar with Abyssinian militias, and set up camp at Hirna. According to Harold G. Marcus, his army "was in poor shape, reduced to a relatively small number by sickness and desertions." A night attack by Emir 'Abd Allah's army at the Battle of Hirna routed the Dejazmach's force, sending them fleeing westward towards the Awash River.

Telephone service came to this town between 1954 and 1968.

Notable local inhabitants include the artist Alemayehu Bizuneh (born 1934). He studied in France (1966–70), and Germany (1975–76) and later had a residency at the National Museum of Ethiopia in 1980. Hirna is also home city of former Deputy Prime minister of Ethiopia Addisu Legesse.

== Demographics ==
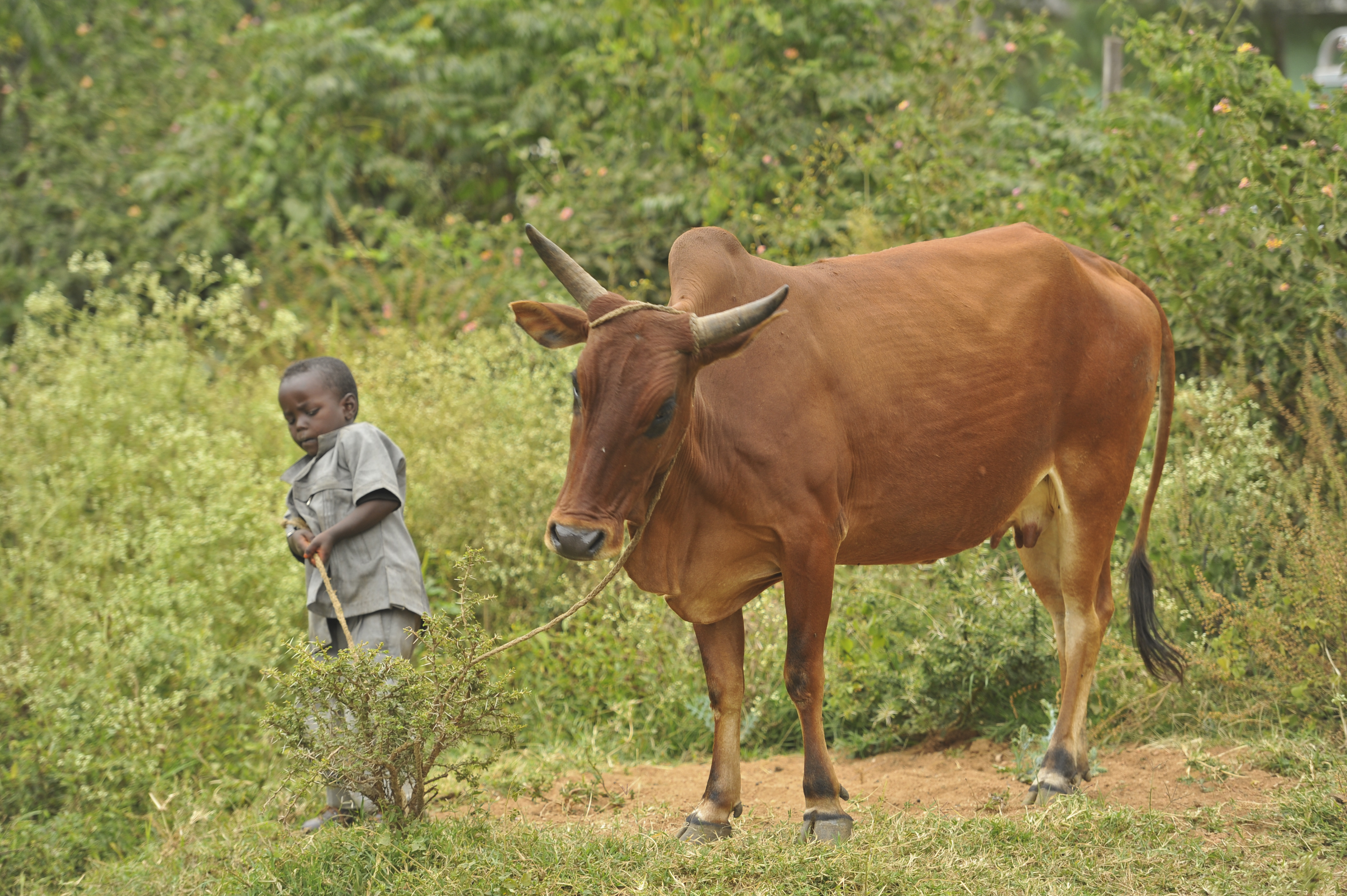
Young boy tying his bull in Hirna

Based on figures from the Central Statistical Agency, in 2005 Hirna has an estimated total population of 16,726, of whom 8,360 are men and 8,366 are women. The 1994 national census reported this town had a total population of 9,353 of whom 4,534 were men and 4,819 women.
