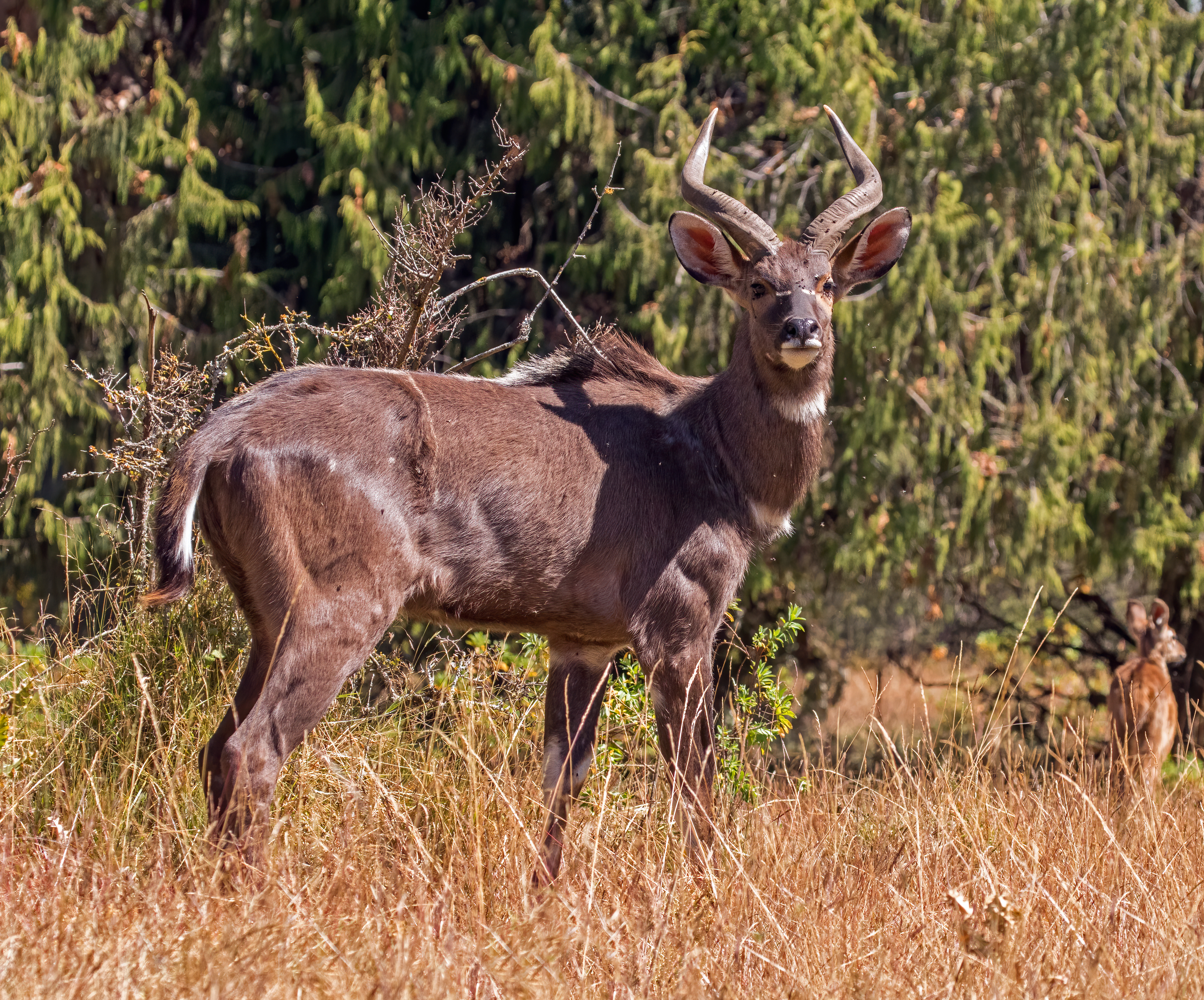
- Male
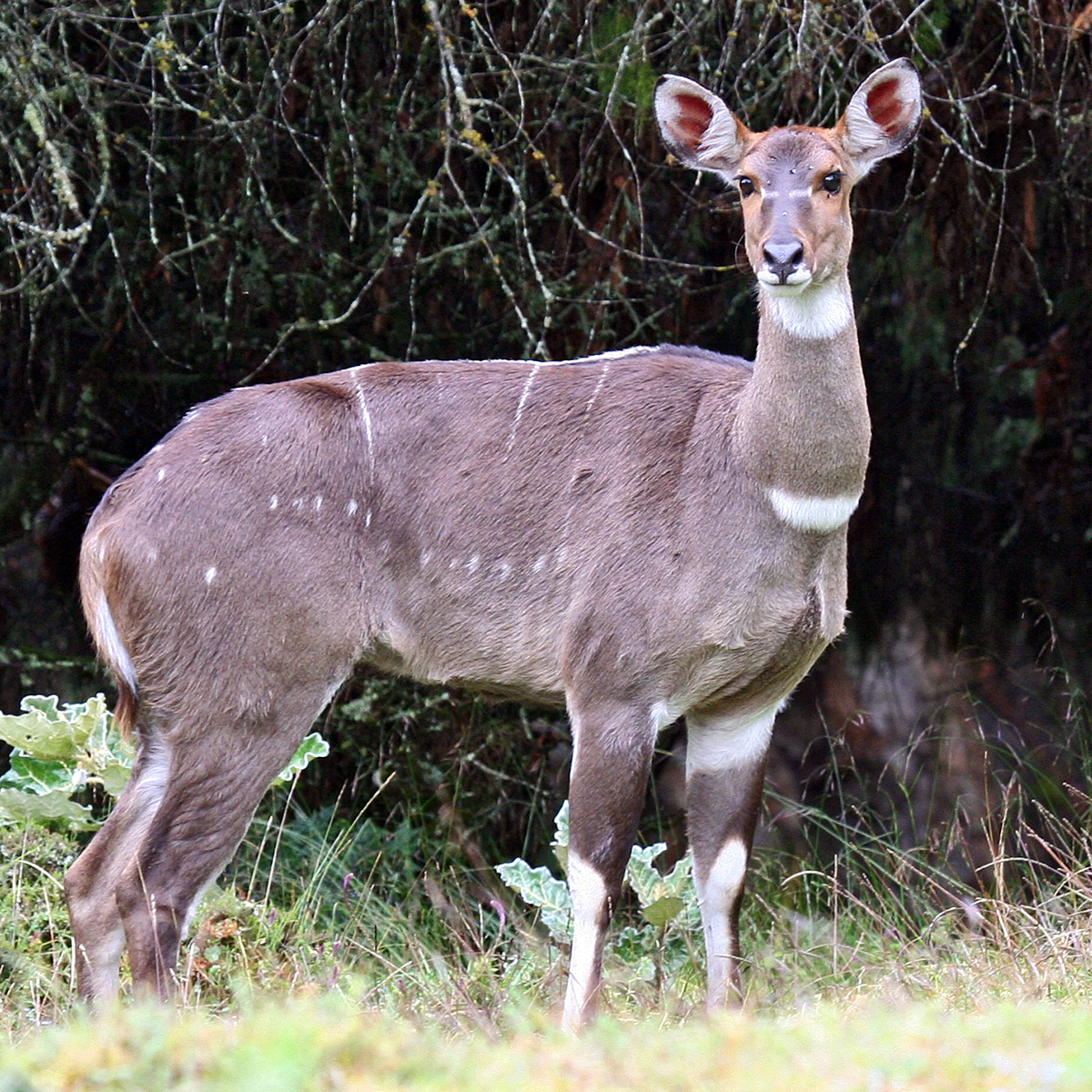
- Female both Bale Mountains National Park, Ethiopia

Conservation status
- Endangered (IUCN 3.1)

Scientific classification
- Kingdom: Animalia
- Phylum: Chordata
- Class: Mammalia
- Order: Artiodactyla
- Family: Bovidae
- Subfamily: Bovinae
- Genus: Tragelaphus
- Subgenus: Tragelaphus
- Species: T. buxtoni

Binomial name
- Tragelaphus buxtoni (Lydekker, 1910)

= Mountain nyala =

Species of antelope

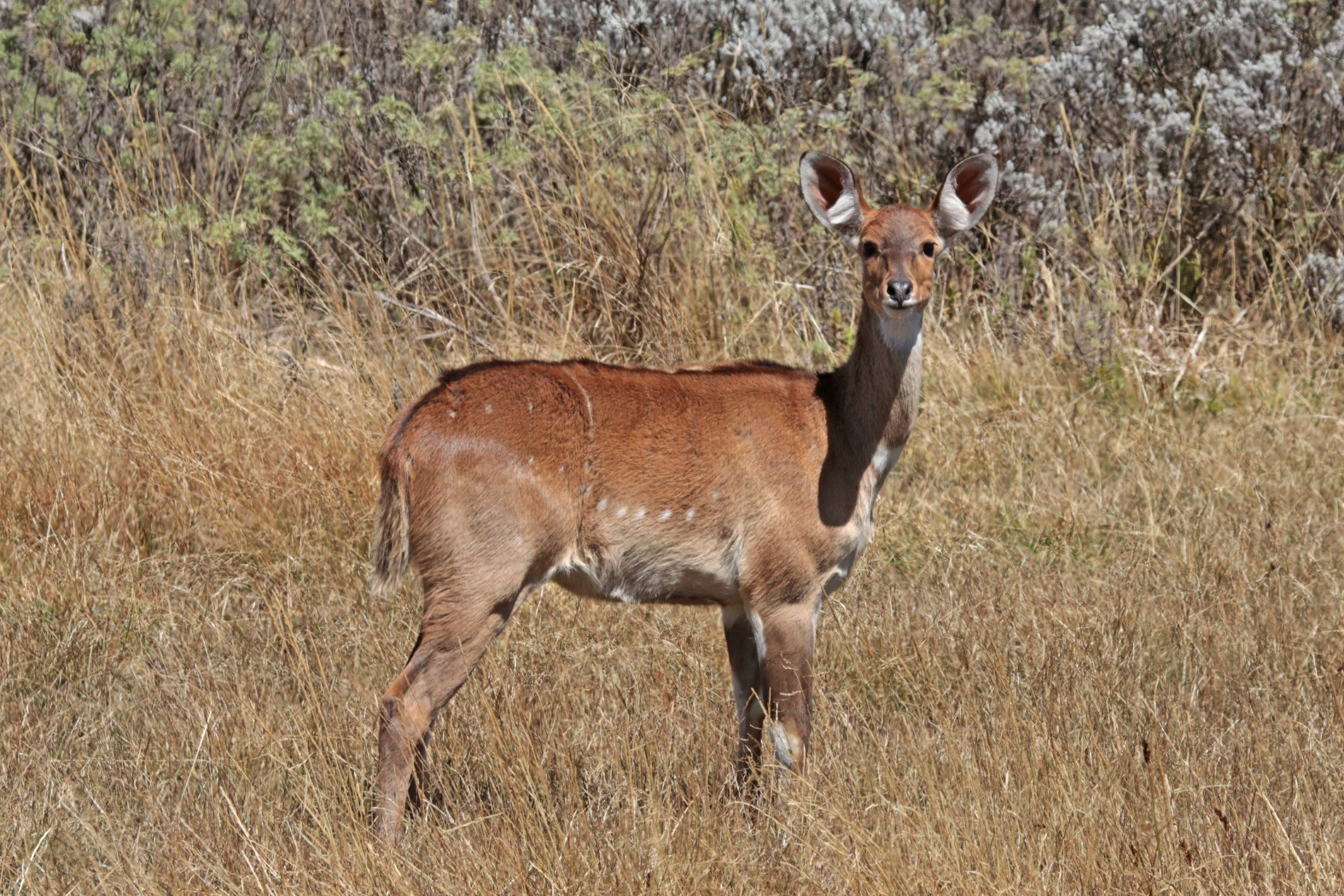
juvenile

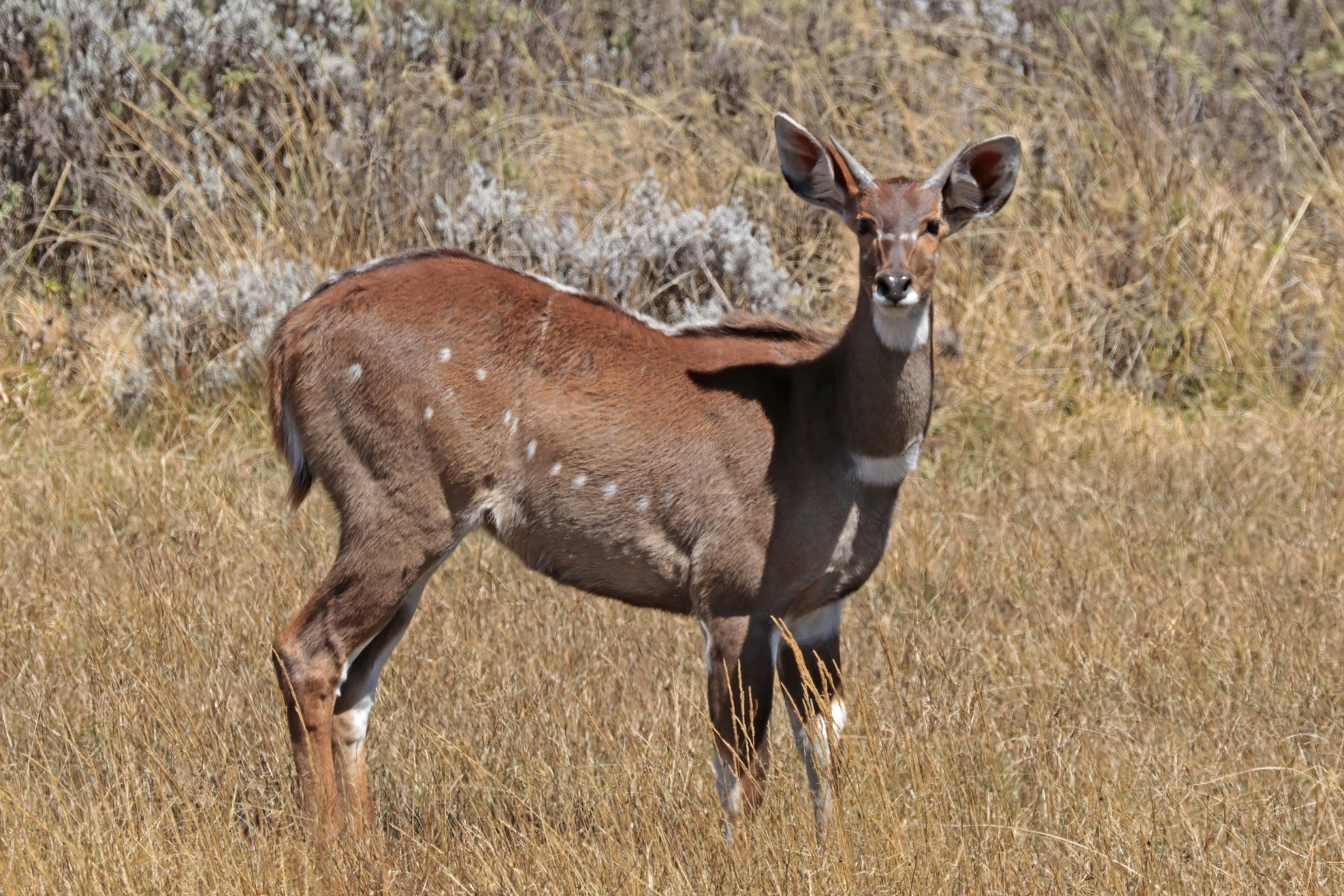
young male

The mountain nyala (Amharic: የደጋ አጋዘን) (Tragelaphus buxtoni) or balbok, is a large antelope found in high altitude woodlands in a small part of central Ethiopia. It is a monotypic species (without any identified subspecies) first described by English naturalist Richard Lydekker in 1910. The males are typically 120–135 cm (47–53 in) tall while females stand 90–100 cm (35–39 in) at the shoulder. Males weigh 180–300 kg (400–660 lb) and females weigh 150–200 kg (330–440 lb). The coat is grey to brown, marked with two to five poorly defined white strips extending from the back to the underside, and a row of six to ten white spots. White markings are present on the face, throat and legs as well. Males have a short dark erect crest, about 10 cm (3.9 in) high, running along the middle of the back. Only males possess horns.

The mountain nyala are shy and elusive towards human beings. Four to five individuals may congregate for short intervals of time to form small herds. Males are not territorial. Primarily a browser, the mountain nyala may switch to grazing occasionally. Females start mating at two years of age, and males too become sexually mature by that time. Gestation lasts for eight to nine months, after which a single calf is born. The lifespan of a mountain nyala is around 15 to 20 years.

The typical habitat for the mountain nyala is composed of montane woodlands at an altitude of 3,000–3,400 m (9,800–11,200 ft). Human settlement and large livestock population have forced the animal to occupy heath forests at an altitude of above 3,400 m (11,200 ft). Mountain nyala are endemic to the Ethiopian Highlands east of the Rift Valley, between 6°N and 10°N. Up to half of the total population of the mountain nyala occurs in the 200 km^{2} (77 sq mi) area of Gaysay, in the northern part of the Bale Mountains National Park. The mountain nyala has been classified under the Endangered category of the International Union for Conservation of Nature and Natural Resources (IUCN). Their influence on Ethiopian culture is notable, with the mountain nyala being featured on the obverse of Ethiopian ten cents coins.

== Taxonomy ==
- - - - - - - Taurotragus
              - Giant eland
              - Common eland
            - - Strepsiceros
                Greater kudu
              - Tragelaphus
                - Mountain nyala
                - - - - Bongo
                      - Sitatunga
                    - - - - Cape bushbuck
                          - Harnessed bushbuck
          - Nyala
            Lowland nyala
        - Ammelaphus
          Lesser kudu

Phylogenetic relationships of the mountain nyala from combined analysis of all molecular data (Willows-Munro et.al. 2005). Subgenera (stem labels) per MDD.

The mountain nyala was first described by English naturalist Richard Lydekker in 1910. Its scientific name is Tragelaphus buxtoni. The species has been classified under the genus Tragelaphus of the family Bovidae. The mountain nyala was first brought to England in 1908 by Major Ivor Buxton, after whom the species has been named. Major Buxton, who had returned from a hunting trip in Ethiopia, first presented a specimen he had shot to British taxidermist Rowland Ward, who later on notified Lydekker about the discovery. It was the last large antelope to be discovered in Africa. The spiral horns and white markings on the face and across the flanks established it as a species of Tragelaphus. Lydekker believed that the species was related more closely to the nyala (T. angasii) than to the two kudu species (then placed under the genus Strepsiceros). In fact, mountain nyala's similarity to both Tragelaphus and Strepsiceros led to the merger of the latter into the former genus.

In 2005, Sandi Willows-Munro of the University of KwaZulu-Natal (Durban) carried out a mitochondrial analysis of the nine Tragelaphus species. mtDNA and nDNA data were compared. The results showed that the mountain nyala is sister taxon to bushbuck (T. scriptus), sitatunga (T. spekii) and bongo (T. eurycerus) in the mitochondrial tree (phylogenetic relationships obtained using mitochondrial data). However, in the nuclear tree, bushbuck, mountain nyala and sitatunga plus the bongo are three equal branches. Hence the mountain nyala forms a monophyletic clade with these three species. The greater kudu clade split from the clade formed by mountain nyala, bongo, sitatunga and bushbuck approximately 8.6 million years ago.

== Description ==
The mountain nyala is a large sexually dimorphic bovid. The head-and-body length is approximately 240–260 cm (94–102 in) in males and 190–200 cm (75–79 in) in females. The males are typically 120–135 cm (47–53 in) tall while females stand 90–100 cm (35–39 in) at the shoulder. Males weigh 180–300 kg (400–660 lb) and females weigh 150–200 kg (330–440 lb). The bushy tail reaches the heel, and is 20–25 cm (7.9–9.8 in) long. The sensitive ears are large and lined with white hair.

The coat is grey to brown, marked with two to five poorly defined white strips extending from the back to the underside, and a row of six to ten white spots. White markings are present on the face, throat and legs as well. The white chevron between the eyes and the white patch on the throat are among the most conspicuous markings. The chest and the rump are white. The lower part of the legs are pale on the inside and clear white spots are present just above the hooves. The coat is fawn brown in male juveniles, and grows darker with age, eventually becoming charcoal in old bulls. Males have a short dark erect crest, about 10 cm (3.9 in) high, running along the middle of the back, from the neck to the tail. Coat texture may vary from smooth to rough, probably by season. Females resemble the red deer hind in size and proportions. Female juveniles are a bright rufous, and old females are as grey as young males. Females have two pairs of inguinal nipples.

Only males possess horns, whose maximum recorded length is 188 cm (74 in). Horns appear as cream-coloured nubs at around six months and start growing in a spiral pattern, reaching full growth by two years. The horns have only one or two spirals, though a few males have been reported to have two-and-a-half turns. The final form might vary in different males – the horns could form well-defined spirals, or could diverge in a structure similar to a lyre, resembling the horns of an impala, but with the final spiral incomplete. Growth rings are visible on the horn sheaths, but the annual patterns might be difficult to comprehend. Though the horns might wear out with age, the cream colour of the tips persists.

The mountain nyala resembles the greater kudu in that both have an array of white spots along their flanks and possess spiral horns. However, the greater kudu can be told apart from the mountain nyala due to the former's greater height and paler colour. Moreover, the horns in greater kudu have two to three spirals, and the tips are farther apart. Another species similar to the mountain nyala is the nyala, but the latter can be easily distinguished from the former due to its smaller size and a fringe of long hair along its throat and neck. The horns of nyala, though very similar, are slender and narrower.

== Ecology and behaviour ==
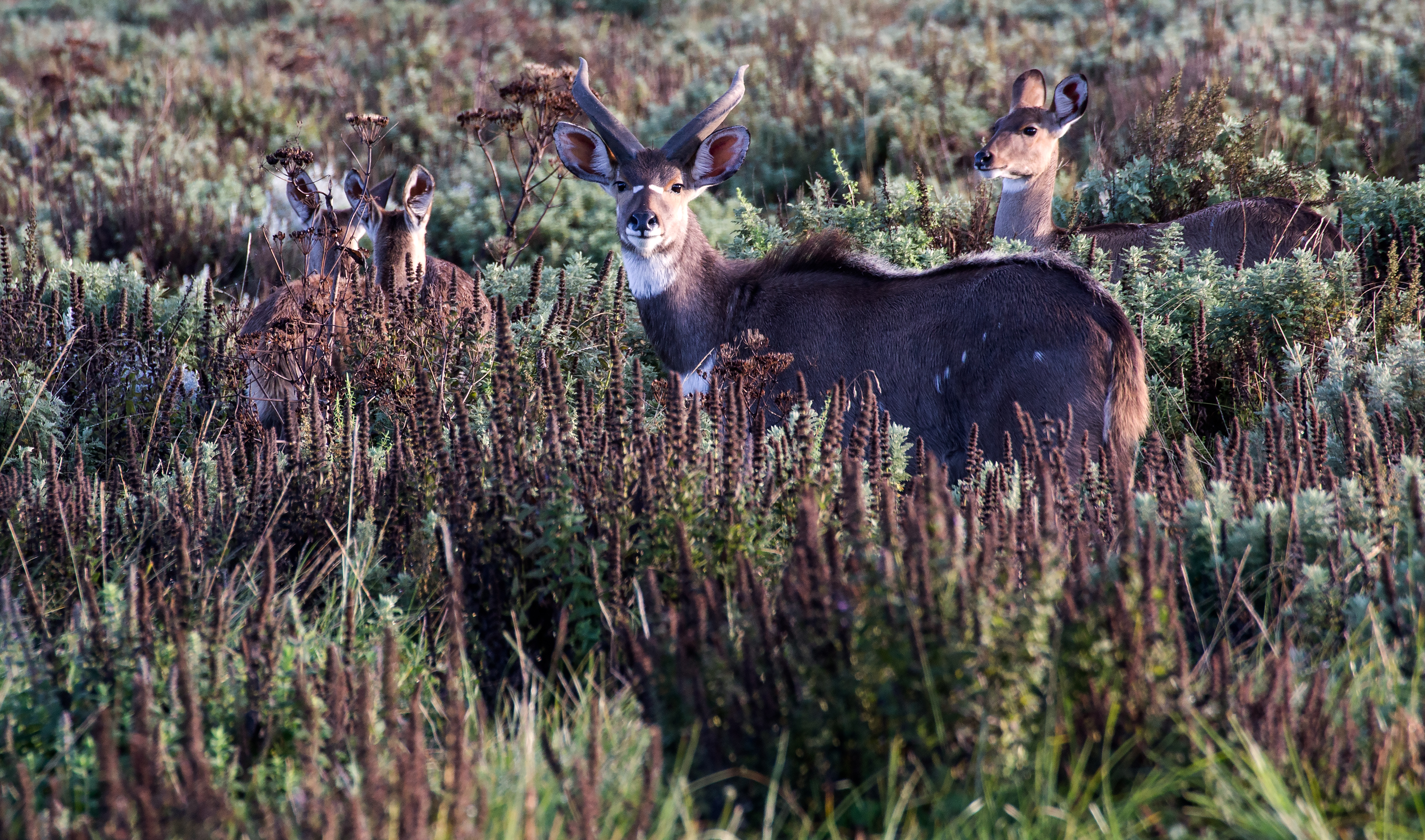
A small herd

The mountain nyala are shy and elusive towards human beings. They spend the night on the edges of forests, feeding part of the time. To avoid human disturbance, they choose to navigate at night. They come out in morning and late afternoon to browse in grasslands. They generally seek cover in woodlands and heather thickets when it is very hot or cold. Feeding may occur in midday, but is interspersed with resting intervals. They tend to come out when it is overcast or raining. In the dry season (November to March), given the dilapidated state of grasslands, the mountain nyala travel up to the wooden areas rich in ericaceous heath.

Four to five individuals may congregate for short intervals of time to form small herds. However, groups containing as many as 100 individuals have been reported from the Bale Zone, composed of several family units moving in and out periodically. Size and longevity of such large herds depends upon the season, habitat type and the time of the day. Female and juvenile groups have adult females accompanied by a calf of her previous year and another of the current year. These groups are led by adult males, depending on the presence of oestrus. Bachelor herds are formed by non-dominant adult bulls and young males, consisting of up to 13 individuals. Mixed sex groups may also be formed. Old bulls tend to lead a solitary life, though they may occasionally visit female herds looking for females in oestrus. Dominance hierarchies are observed in both sexes.

Males are not territorial, and have home ranges covering 15–20 km^{2} (5.8–7.7 sq mi) in the wet season. Females and juveniles, on the other hand, occupy much smaller ranges of about 5 km^{2} (1.9 sq mi) in the wet season. Dry season ranges are much larger than the wet season ones for both sexes. Males often wrestle using their horns. Though usually silent, the mountain nyala may "cough" noticing a potential threat, or utter a low bark if the threat is more serious. The leopard is the main predator of the mountain nyala.

=== Diet ===
Primarily a browser, the mountain nyala may switch to grazing occasionally. It feeds on low-height herbs, bushes, shrubs and general foliage. They might even eat lichens, ferns and aquatic plants. Grasses are specially preferred during the early wet season. They pick up fallen leaves and use their horns to reach higher branches. Favoured species include Artemisia afra (African wormwood), Hypericum revolutum, Kniphofia foliosa, Solanum sessilistellatum and Hagenia abyssinica leaves. They prefer Alchemilla rotti, Helichrysum splendidum and lower foliage of Lobelia rhynchopetalum.

=== Reproduction ===
Females start mating at two years of age, and males too become sexually mature by that time. Sexual dimorphism, larger home ranges for males, and a female-biased population indicate polygyny in the species. The mountain nyala breed throughout the year, but the peak occurs in December. Prior to and during the breeding season the adult males tend to get associated with mixed sex herds. Bulls continuously follow receptive females and test their vulvas. Three to four males may seek a single female, and, if equally ranked in hierarchy, may engage in circling displays. In these displays the males move very slowly and stiffly, with the crest on the back erect and the tail raised. They are less likely to engage in aggressive fights, which, if they happen, last only for a brief period. Flehmen follows vulva-testing.

Gestation lasts for eight to nine months, after which a single calf is born. In the Bale Mountains National Park, births occur throughout the year, but peak from September to November. Calves remain in cover for the first few weeks after birth. The calves remain close to their mothers for nearly two years. The young females may get pregnant by then. The young males, as they mature by two years, are challenged by other males and driven out of their herds. The lifespan of a mountain nyala is around 15 to 20 years.

== Habitat and distribution ==
The range of mountain nyala is confined within Ethiopia.

The typical habitat for the mountain nyala is composed of montane woodlands at an altitude of 3,000–3,400 m (9,800–11,200 ft). The vegetation generally includes African juniper (Juniperus procera), Afrocarpus gracilior, and Olea at lower levels and Hagenia abyssinica, juniper, and Hypericum revolutum in the upper reaches. They often visit the edges of montane grasslands at 2,800–3,100 m (9,200–10,200 ft), which is covered with Artemisia afra, Kniphofia, and evergreen Hypericum species.

Nowadays the continuous blocks of woodland habitat have been reduced to a series of pockets, interspersed in large cultivated lands. Human settlement and large livestock population have forced the animal to occupy heath forests at an altitude of above 3,400 m (11,200 ft) rich in Erica arborea, Erica trimera, Hypericum, Euphorbia, and Helichrysum species. They may even be forced into afroalpine grasslands containing Alchemilla and Festuca species, at an altitude of up to 4,300 m (14,100 ft). In the eastern borders of its range, the mountain nyala has usually been observed to occupy areas at lower altitudes of about 1,800–2,400 m (5,900–7,900 ft).

Mountain nyala are endemic to the Ethiopian Highlands east of the Rift Valley, between 6°N and 10°N. Their former range was from Mount Gara Muleta in the east to Shashamene and the northern Bale Zone to the south. Up to half of the total population of the mountain nyala occurs in the 200 km^{2} (77 sq mi) area of Gaysay, in the northern part of the Bale Mountains National Park. Smaller relict populations occur in Chercher, mountains such as Chilalo in Arsi Zone, and the western Bale. A study identified an area of 39.38 km^{2} (15.20 sq mi) on the southern escarpment of the Bale Mountains as the most sustainable habitat for the mountain nyala.

== Threats and conservation ==
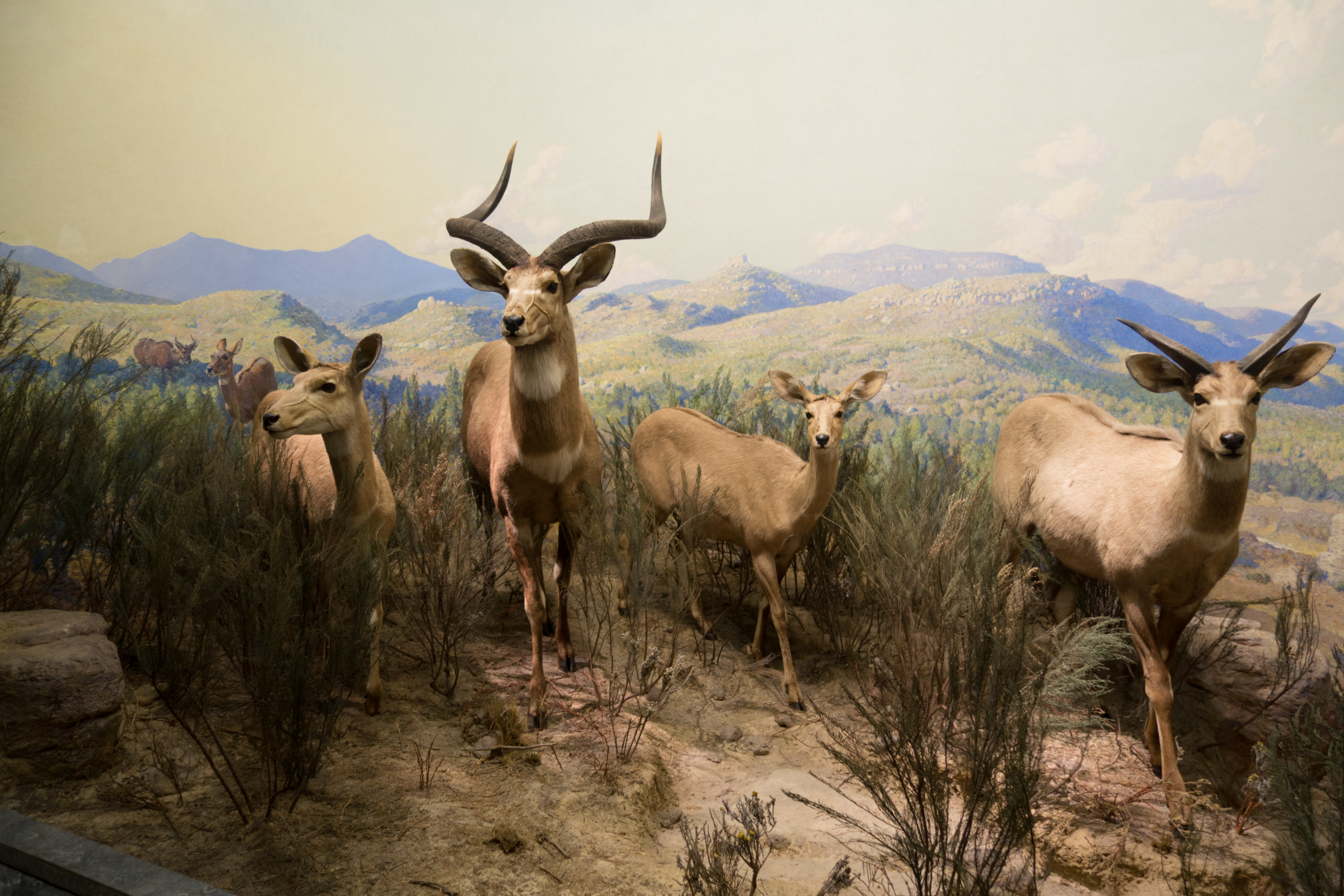
Taxidermied specimens at the American Museum of Natural History

Major threats to the survival of the mountain nyala include illegal hunting, habitat destruction, encroachment by livestock, predation of calves by dogs, expansion of montane cultivation and construction at high altitudes. The animal is extensively hunted for its horns and meat. The meat is utilised in local medicine and for making nipples for traditional milk bottles. Impact of trophy hunting programs is obscure, and current trophy hunting quotas may be unsustainable in the long term although, if well regulated, trophy hunting could play an important role in the long term management of this species.

The mountain nyala has been classified under the Endangered category of the International Union for Conservation of Nature and Natural Resources (IUCN). It has not been listed under the Washington Convention (CITES). Though legal protection has been fully ensured for the species, the implementation has not been so effective. In 1991, there was widespread unrest in Ethiopia during which several mountain nyala were killed and the population in the Bale Mountains National Park fell to 150. After the Bale Mountains National Park, the small Kuni-Muktar Mountain Nyala Sanctuary was established in 1990 was established as a second protected area. But by 1996 the sanctuary had been so severely affected by deforestation, poaching, cultivation and gully erosion, that the populations soon disappeared from there.

In the 1960s, the population was estimated at 7,000 to 8,000 (and perhaps up to 12,500). This declined sharply to 2,000 to 4,000 individuals in the 1980s. The population is decreasing even now. The mountain nyala is feared to be extinct in the eastern and southern extremes of its range, though a few probably survive in Chiro (Asebe Teferi) and the border between Bale and Sidamo, south of Kofele. Apart from Gaysay about 80 to 120 mountain nyala occur in the rest of the Bale Mountains National Park, and a few hundred occur in the areas in the vicinity of the national park.

== Relationship with humans ==
The influence of the mountain nyala, as well as the nyala, on Ethiopian culture can not be ignored. Although nyala is a South African word, several prominent businesses such as Nyala Motors use it in their names. The nyala and mountain nyala often regularly appear on walls, commercial products and tourist curios. The mountain nyala is featured on the obverse of the Ethiopian ten cents coin.

Mountain nyala are hunted by humans, for instance, by the Oromo people. The Oromo do not hunt these animals in general, except for a day close to Easter, when all able-bodied men set out on horses for a hunt.
