= Guba Koricha =

District located in eastern Oromia state of Ethiopia

Coordinates: 8°50′N 40°20′E

Guba Koricha Gubaa Qorichaa (Oromo)
- District
- Location within Ethiopia
- Country: Ethiopia
- Region: (Oromia Region) Oromia
- Zone: West Hararghe
- Time zone: UTC+3 (EAT)

Guba Koricha (Oromo: Gubbaa Qorichaa) is a zone woreda in Oromia Regional State, Ethiopia. Located in the West Hararghe Zone, Guba Koricha, .according to the OCHA map (2005) is bordered on the south by Darolebu, on the southwest by the Arsi Zone, on the west by the Afar Region, on the north by Mieso, on the northeast by Chiro, on the east by Habro, and on the southeast by Boke. Woreda of Anchar was separated from Guba Koricha.

Although coffee is an important cash crop of this District, less than 20 square kilometers are planted with this crop.

== Demographics ==
The 2007 national census reported this District's total population as 122,335, of whom 62,633 were men and 59,702 were women; 2,875 or 2.35% of its population were urban dwellers. The majority of the inhabitants (93.26%) said they were Muslim, while 6.43% of the population practiced Ethiopian Orthodox Christianity.

Based on figures published by the Central Statistical Agency in 2005, this district has an estimated total population of 192,846, of whom 94,136 were males and 98,710 were females; 7,033 or 3.65% of its population are urban dwellers, which is less than the Zone average of 9.6%. With an estimated area of 1,477.66 square kilometers, Guba Koricha has an estimated population density of 130.5 people per square kilometer, which is greater than the Zone average of 101.8.

The 1994 national census reported a total population for this District of 139,198, of whom 71,625 were men and 67,573 women; 3,930 or 2.82% of its population were urban dwellers at the time. The three largest ethnic groups reported in Guba Koricha were the Oromo (81.52%), the Amhara (11.86%) and the Argobba (6.16%); all other ethnic groups made up 0.46% of the population. Oromo was spoken as a first language by 80.49%, and 19.06% spoke Amharic; the remaining 0.45% spoke all other primary languages reported. The majority of the inhabitants were Moslem, with 86.11% of the population reporting they practiced that belief, while 12.02% of the population said they professed Ethiopian Orthodox Christianity and 1.8% were Catholic.
