= Malka Balo =

District located in eastern Oromia state of Ethiopia

Coordinates: 8°50′N 41°15′E

Malka Balo Malkaa Ballooo (Oromo)
- District
- Location within Ethiopia
- Country: Ethiopia
- Region: (Oromia Region) Oromia
- Zone: East Hararghe
- Time zone: UTC+3 (EAT)

Malka Balo (Oromo: Aanaa Malkaa Balloo) is a Districts of Ethiopia in Oromia, Ethiopia. Part of the East Hararghe Zone, Malka Balo is bordered on the west by the West Hararghe Zone, on the north by Deder, on the northeast by Bedeno, and on the southeast by Gola Odana Meyumuluke; part of the boundary with the West Hararghe Zone is defined by the Galetti River. The administrative center for this woreda is Jaja; other towns include Bareda, Harawacha and Harew.

== Overview ==
The altitude of this woreda ranges from 960 to 2930 meters above sea level; Adem Gedi Burqa is the highest point. Perennial rivers include the Jerjertu, Jaja, Dugo and Ramis. A survey of the land in this woreda shows that 17.3% is arable or cultivable, 5.6% pasture, 12.9% forest, and the remaining 64.2% is considered degraded, built-up or otherwise unusable. Khat, fruits and vegetables are important cash crops. Coffee is also an important cash crop; over 50 square kilometers are planted with it.

Industry in the woreda includes 12 grain mills employing 45 people, as well as 210 registered businesses including wholesalers, retailers and service providers. Copper and marble deposits are known, but have not been extracted. There were 23 Farmers Associations with 25,579 members and 4 Farmers Service Cooperatives with 3210 members. Malka Balo has 6 kilometers of gravel and 85 kilometers of dry-weather road, for an average road density of 61.9 kilometers per 1000 square kilometers. About 19.4% of the urban, 9.2% of the rural and 9.7% of the total population has access to drinking water.

== Demographics ==
The 2007 national census reported a total population for this woreda of 177,416, of whom 90,609 were men and 86,807 were women; 9,342 or 5.27% of its population were urban dwellers. The majority of the inhabitants said they were Muslim, with 94.96% of the population reporting they observed this belief, while 4.78% of the population practised Ethiopian Orthodox Christianity.

Based on figures published by the Central Statistical Agency in 2005, this woreda has an estimated total population of 171,483, of whom 83,930 are men and 87,553 are women; 10,320 or 6.02% of its population are urban dwellers, which is about the same as the Zone average of 6.9%. With an estimated area of 1,469.53 square kilometers, Malka Balo has an estimated population density of 116.7 people per square kilometer, which is greater than the Zone average of 102.6.

The 1994 national census reported a total population for this woreda of 123,082, of whom 63,108 were men and 59,974 women; 5,763 or 4.68% of its population were urban dwellers at the time. (This total also includes an estimate for the inhabitants of one rural kebele, which was not counted; it was estimated to have 13,111 inhabitants, of whom 6,594 were men and 6,517 women.) The two largest ethnic groups reported in Malko Balo were the Oromo (93.65%), and the Amhara (6.12%); all other ethnic groups made up 0.23% of the population. Oromiffa was spoken as a first language by 94.95%, and 4.92% spoke Amharic; the remaining 0.13% spoke all other primary languages reported. The majority of the inhabitants were Muslim, with 93.34% of the population having reported they practiced that belief, while 6.52% of the population said they professed Ethiopian Orthodox Christianity.
