= Nannawa Chiro =

District located in eastern Oromia state of Ethiopia

Coordinates: 8°55′N 40°15′E

Nannawa Chiro Naannawa Ciroo (Oromo)
- District
- Location within Ethiopia
- Country: Ethiopia
- Region: (Oromia Region) Oromia
- Zone: West Hararghe
- Time zone: UTC+3 (EAT)

Nannawa Chiro is one of the Aanaas in Oromia Regional State, Ethiopia. Part of the West Hararghe Zone, Chiro is bordered on the south by Kuni, on the west by Guba Koricha, on the northwest by Mieso, on the north by Doba, on the northeast by Tulo, and on the east by the Galetti River which separates it from Mesela and the East Hararghe Zone. It is part of the former Chiro district that was divided to create Nannawa Chiro and Gemechis districts and Chiro Town.

The highest peak in Chiro is Mount Arba Gugu (3574 meters). Khat is an important cash crop of this district, but because it is a very perishable commodity and must be cultivated not too far from major markets or good roads, it is grown along the main road. Coffee is another important cash crop, with over 5,000 hectares is planted with this crop.

== Demographics ==
The 2007 national census reported a total population for this district of 169,912, of whom 87,003 were men and 82,909 were women; none of its population were urban dwellers. The majority of the inhabitants said they were Muslim, with 83.68% of the population reporting they observed this belief, while 15.4% of the population practiced Ethiopian Orthodox Christianity.

Based on figures published by the Central Statistical Agency in 2005, this woreda has an estimated total population of 412,938, of whom 201,965 are men and 210,973 are women; 37,296 or 9.03% of its population are urban dwellers, which is about the same as the Zone average of 9.6%. With an estimated area of 1,786.88 square kilometers, Chiro has an estimated population density of 231.1 people per square kilometer, which is greater than the Zone average of 101.8.

The 1994 national census reported a total population for this woreda of 294,295, of whom 150,917 were men and 143,378 women; 20,842 or 7.08% of its population were urban dwellers at the time. The two largest ethnic groups reported in Chiro were the Oromo (86.25%), and the Amhara (12.69%); all other ethnic groups made up 1.06% of the population. Oromo was spoken as a first language by 85.23%, and 14.3% spoke Amharic; the remaining 0.47% spoke all other primary languages reported. The majority of the inhabitants were Moslem, with 82.01% of the population reporting they practiced that belief, while 17.37% of the population said they professed Ethiopian Orthodox Christianity.
