= Masela (Aanaa) =

District in Oromia Region, Ethiopia

Coordinates: 8°50′N 41°05′E

Mesela (officially: Shanan dhugo) is a woreda in Oromia Region, Ethiopia. Part of the West Hararghe Zone, Mesela is bordered on the southwest by the Galetti River which separates it from Chiro, on the northwest by Tulo, and on the east by the East Hararghe Zone. Towns in Mesela include Waldia and Mesela.

Coffee is an important cash crop of this woreda; over 50 square kilometers are planted with this crop. Coffee grown in Mesela is well known for its high quality.

== Demographics ==
The 2007 national census reported a total population for this woreda of 151,698, of whom 76,864 were men and 74,834 women; 4,590 or 3.03% of its population were urban dwellers. The majority of the inhabitants (90.86%) said they were Muslim, while 8.69% of the population practised Ethiopian Orthodox Christianity.

Based on figures published by the Central Statistical Agency in 2005, this woreda has an estimated total population of 154,502, of whom 75,881 are men and 78,621 women; 5,841 or 3.78% of its population are urban dwellers, which is less than the Zone average of 9.6%. With an estimated area of 686.57 square kilometers, Mesela has an estimated population density of 225 people per square kilometer, which is greater than the Zone average of 101.8.

The 1994 national census reported a total population for this woreda of 111,478, of whom 57,012 were men and 54,466 women; 3,262 or 2.93% of its population were urban dwellers at the time. The two largest ethnic groups reported in Mesela were the Oromo (91.04%), and the Amhara (8.72%); all other ethnic groups made up 0.24% of the population. Oromiffa was spoken as a first language by 91.4%, and 8.54% spoke Amharic; the remaining 0.06% spoke all other primary languages reported. The majority of the inhabitants were Moslem, with 90.11% of the population reporting they practiced that belief, while 9.77% of the population said they professed Ethiopian Orthodox Christianity.
