= Kuni-Muktar Mountain Nyala Sanctuary =

Wildlife sanctuary in Ethiopia

- Location within Ethiopia
- Location: West Hararghe Zone, Oromia Region, Ethiopia
- Nearest city: Chiro
- Coordinates: 9°01′00″N 40°51′05″E
- Established: 1989
- Governing body: Ethiopian Wildlife Conservation Authority (EWCA)

Kuni-Muktar Mountain Nyala Sanctuary is a wildlife sanctuary in Oromia Region of Ethiopia. It was set up in 1989 through the intervention of the Zoological Society of London to safeguard a small decreasing population of the critically endangered Mountain nyala (Tragelaphus buxtoni).

== Geography ==
The sanctuary is located in the Ahmar Mountains, the eastward extension of the Ethiopian Highlands. The reserve consists of two fragmented blocks of upper Afromontane forest near the village of Kuni, with the Muktar Forest lying east of the village and Sobaly-Jelo Forest to the west, between 2300 and 3075 meters elevation.

== Mountain nyala ==
Mountain nyala, endemic to Ethiopia, are that country's biggest and rarest antelope, but also a most prized hunt for a few, the total cost of a photo and a head trophy ranging between US$35,000 and 50,000. Though this animal was reported extinct in the sanctuary by 1996, it was found present in small numbers by a local count in 2002, and an Italian mission confirmed its presence in 2008. The remnant population is estimated at 70-80 by Vigano based on ground observation and counts and at 200 by Evangelista, based on satellite photography and a prediction method. The same mission noted actions by a local hunter to obtain permission to obtain trophies through a stratagem. The Ethiopian Environment Protection Authority reportedly began legal action against the hunter in December 2008.
