= Zengana (disambiguation) =

Zengana may refer to:

- Zanganeh, a Shabak tribe
- Zəngənə, Azerbaijan
- Zengana, Iraq, in northern Iraq
- Artemisia afra, a shrub endemic to southern Africa
