= Boke (Aanaa) =

District located in eastern Oromia state of Ethiopia

Coordinates: 8°20′N 40°45′E

Boke Bookee (Oromo)
- District
- Location within Ethiopia
- Country: Ethiopia
- Region: (Oromia Region) Oromia
- Zone: West Hararghe
- Time zone: UTC+3 (EAT)

Boke is one of the Aanaas in Oromia Regional State, Ethiopia. Part of the West Hararghe Zone, Boke is bordered on the south by the Shabelle River which separates it from the Bale Zone, on the southwest by Darolebu, on the northwest by Habro, on the northeast by Kuni, and on the east by the Galetti River which separates it from the East Hararghe Zone. The major town in Boke is Boke Tiko.

Coffee is an important cash crop of this woreda. Over 50 square kilometers are planted with this crop.

Boke was selected in 2006 by the Ministry of Agriculture and Rural Development as an area for voluntary resettlement for farmers from overpopulated areas. Along with Darolebu and Kuni, Boke became the new home for 3308 families.

== Demographics ==
The 2007 national census reported a total population for this woreda of 151,156, of whom 76,980 were men and 74,176 were women; 6,696 or 4.43% of its population were urban dwellers. The majority of the inhabitants (97.04%) reported that they were Muslim, while 2.73% of the population practised Ethiopian Orthodox Christianity.

Based on figures published by the Central Statistical Agency in 2005, this woreda has an estimated total population of 103,803, of whom 50,436 are men and 53,367 are women; 3,745 or 3.61% of its population are urban dwellers, which is less than the Zone average of 9.6%. With an estimated area of 3,461.88 square kilometers, Boke has an estimated population density of 30 people per square kilometer, which is less than the Zone average of 101.8.

The 1994 national census reported a total population for this woreda of 74,931, of whom 38,713 were men and 36,218 women; 2,090 or 2.79% of its population were urban dwellers at the time. The three largest ethnic groups reported in Boke were the Oromo (94.03%), the Somali (2.96%) and the Amhara (2.94%); all other ethnic groups made up 0.07% of the population. Oromiffa was spoken as a first language by 93.94%, 3.04% spoke Amharic, and 2.98% spoke Somali; the remaining 0.04% spoke all other primary languages reported. The majority of the inhabitants were Moslem, with 96.66% of the population reporting they practiced that belief, while 3.17% of the population said they professed Ethiopian Orthodox Christianity.
