= Habro =

District in Oromia Region, Ethiopia

Coordinates: 8°40′N 40°20′E

Habro Habroo (Oromo)
- Woreda
- Location within Ethiopia
- Country: Ethiopia
- Region: (Oromia Region) Oromia
- Zone: West Hararghe
- Time zone: UTC+3 (EAT)

Habro is one of the woredas in the Oromia Region of Ethiopia. It is named after the former Aanaa of the same name. Part of the West Hararghe Zone, the district is bordered on the south by Darolebu, on the west and north by Guba Koricha, on the northeast by Kuni, and on the southeast by Boke. Towns in Habro include Belbelti, Gelemso and Wachu.

Khat is an important cash crop of this district, but because it is a very perishable commodity and must be cultivated not too far from major markets or good roads, it is grown largely along the main roads.

== Demographics ==
The 2007 national census reported a total population for this woreda of 190,455, of whom 98,593 were men and 91,862 were women; 25,233 or 13.25% of its population were urban dwellers. The majority of the inhabitants (84.92%) said they were Muslim, while 14.52% of the population practised Ethiopian Orthodox Christianity.

Based on figures published by the Central Statistical Agency in 2005, this district has an estimated total population of 176,863, of whom 85,765 are men and 91,098 are women; 26,982 or 15.26% of its population are urban dwellers, which is greater than the Zone average of 9.6%. With an estimated area of 730.32 square kilometers, Habro has an estimated population density of 242.2 people per square kilometer, which is greater than the Zone average of 101.8.

The 1994 national census reported a total population for this district of 124,184, of whom 64,071 were men and 60,113 women; 15,071 or 12.14% of its population were urban dwellers at the time. The three largest ethnic groups reported in Habro were the Oromo (83.22%), the Amhara (15.21%) and the Somali (0.59%); all other ethnic groups made up 0.98% of the population. Oromo was spoken as a first language by 81.52%, and 17.59% spoke Amharic; the remaining 0.89% spoke all other primary languages reported. The majority of the inhabitants were Muslim, with 81.66% of the population reporting they practiced that belief, while 18.07% of the population said they professed Ethiopian Orthodox Christianity.
