= Daru labu =

District located in eastern Oromia state of Ethiopia

Coordinates: 8°10′N 40°30′E

Daru labu Daaru labuu (Oromo)
- District
- Location within Ethiopia
- Country: Ethiopia
- Region: (Oromia Region) Oromia
- Zone: West Hararghe
- Time zone: UTC+3 (EAT)

Daru labu is a woreda in the Oromia Region of Ethiopia. Located in the West Hararghe Zone, Daru labu is bordered on the south by the Shebelle River which separates it from the Bale Zone, on the west by the Arsi Zone, on the northwest by Guba Koricha, on the north by the Habro, and on the east by Boke. Towns in Darolebu include Mechara and Micheta.

Coffee is an important cash crop of this woreda. Over 50 square kilometers are planted with this crop.

Darolebu was selected in 2006 by the Ministry of Agriculture and Rural Development as an area for voluntary resettlement for farmers from overpopulated areas. Along with Boke and Kuni, Darolebu became the new home for 3308 families.

== Demographics ==
The 2007 national census reported a total population for this woreda of 198,095, of whom 101,596 were men and 96,499 were women; 16,862 or 8.51% of its population were urban dwellers. The majority of the inhabitants (94.21%) said they were Muslim, while 5.18% of the population practised Ethiopian Orthodox Christianity.

Based on figures published by the Central Statistical Agency in 2005, this woreda had an estimated total population of 155,644, of whom 75,300 were males and 80,344 were females; 13,360 or 8.58% of its population are urban dwellers, which is less than the Zone average of 9.6%. With an estimated area of 4,388.91 square kilometers, Darolebu has an estimated population density of 35.5 people per square kilometer, which is less than the Zone average of 101.8.

The 1994 national census reported a total population for this woreda of 110,199, of whom 57,097 were men and 53,102 women; 7,463 or 6.77% of its population were urban dwellers at the time. (This total also includes an estimate for the inhabitants of one rural kebele, which was not counted; they were estimated to have 849 inhabitants, of whom 444 were men and 405 women.) The four largest ethnic groups reported in Darolebu were the Oromo (88.44%), the Somali (5.2%), the Amhara (4.64%), and the Argobba (0.56%); all other ethnic groups made up 1.16% of the population. Oromiffa was spoken as a first language by 87.79%, 6.82% spoke Amharic, and 5.2% spoke Somali; the remaining 0.19% spoke all other primary languages reported. The majority of the inhabitants were Moslem, with 93.16% of the population reporting they practiced that belief, while 6.58% of the population said they professed Ethiopian Orthodox Christianity.
