= Mieso, Oromia (woreda) =

District in Oromia Region, Ethiopia

Coordinates: 9°00′N 40°25′E

Mieso Mi'eesso (Oromo)
- Woreda
- Location within Ethiopia
- Country: Ethiopia
- Region: Oromia
- Zone: West Hararghe
- Time zone: UTC+3 (EAT)

Mieso is a woreda in Oromia Region, Ethiopia. Part of the West Hararghe Zone, Mieso is bordered on the south by Guba Koricha, on the west by the Afar Region, on the north by the Somali Region, on the east by Doba and on the southeast by Chiro. The administrative center for this woreda is Mieso; other towns in Mieso include Asebot, Kora, Bordode and Gololcha. Did you mean:area Bordode Ethio-Djibouti Railways Gotha 395 Bike 421 Afdem 450 Mulu 461 Mieso 475 Asabot 496 Kora 518 Arba Bordode 548 Awash River Gorge bridge 548 Awash 579 Metehara 617 Malka Jilo 634 Borchotto... 38 KB (4,333 words) - 04:17, 30 September 2025 mieso after 2015 It's including new woreda(Gumbi Bordode), West Hararghe,Oromia (woreda) This woreda is served by the Ethio-Djibouti Railways, with stops at Arba Bordode, Asabot,Kora and Mieso. In 8 of the 37 kebeles, the predominant agricultural... 9 KB (1,006 words) - 20:52, 4 May 2025 Railway stations in Ethiopia Borchotto abandoned Malka Jilo abandoned Metehara abandoned Awash abandoned Arba Bordode abandoned Kora abandoned Asabot abandoned Mieso defunct Mulu defunct... 19 KB (717 words) - 07:37, 28 July 2025 Galamso weather roads which run in the west to Awash (via small towns of Hardim and Bordode), and in the east to Dire Dawa through Wachu and Badessa. (The remnant... 55 KB (7,294 words) - 14:03, 30 September 2025

== Overview ==
The altitude of Mieso ranges from 1107 to 3106 meters above sea level; the highest point is Mount Asabot (1523 meters). Rivers include the Beke. A survey of the land in Mieso shows that 11.5% is arable or cultivable (10.7% of the total area was under annual crops), 23.7% cultivable if water were available, 8.9% pasture, 28.7% forest or brushland, and the remaining 27.3% is considered hilly, built-up or otherwise unusable. Sesame and haricot beans are important cash crops. Local points of interest in Mieso woreda include the Monastery of Asabot Selassie, located at the top of Mount Asabot, 20 kilometers northeast of the town of Asabot. This woreda is served by the Ethio-Djibouti Railways, with stops at Arba Bordode, Asabot, Kora and Mieso.

In 8 of the 37 kebeles, the predominant agricultural practice is pastoralism; some pastoralists are sedentary and other migrate with their herds in search of forage and water. Cattle and goats are the most common livestock, and the vegetation is primarily acacia with grass cover beneath. Mieso reportedly has become, since 2003, one of the major markets of goats supplying the slaughterhouses in Mojo and Metehara which export mutton. In 2005 there were 5 goat meatpacking companies based in this woreda, which included ELFORA Agro-Industries.

There are seven non–agricultural cooperatives organized in this woreda. Three of these are multipurpose, another three specialize in mining, while the last one is dedicated to saving and credit. There are also 13 farmers' cooperatives: 9 multipurpose, 2 credit and saving, and 2 dairy cooperatives run by women which are at the beginning stage of organization. There is also one self-initiated cooperative in Oda Roba kebele, for the purpose of crop harvesting. There are no micro-finance institutions in Mieso.

== History ==
It was in this woreda that Emperor Iyasu V, hurrying back to the capital city of Addis Ababa to deal with a palace coup, was defeated by the plotters in October, 1916. In the 1950s, the woreda was one of the about fifteen most important cotton production areas in Ethiopia outside of Eritrea.

Numerous conflicts between the local Oromos and Somalis in Mieso followed the October 2004 referendum to establish the disputed boundary between the Oromia and Somali Regions; over 2,500 people displaced from their homes in December 2004 had sought refuge in the woreda. Conflicts had erupted at Mieso by mid-February. NGOs working in the area reported these conflicts continued in the town of Mieso as late as 14 July 2005.

== Demographics ==
The 2007 national census reported a total population for this woreda of 130,709, of whom 66,891 were men and 63,818 were women; 25,388 or 19.42% of its population were urban dwellers. The majority of the inhabitants (97.06%) said they were Muslim, while 2.66% of the population practised Ethiopian Orthodox Christianity.

Based on figures published by the Central Statistical Agency in 2005, this woreda has an estimated total population of 137,126, of whom 66,553 are men and 70,573 are women; 36,165 or 26.37% of its population are urban dwellers, which is greater than the Zone average of 9.6%. With an estimated area of 2,573.44 square kilometers, Mieso has an estimated population density of 53.3 people per square kilometer, which is less than the Zone average of 101.8.

The 1994 national census reported a total population for this woreda of 91,572, of whom 47,061 were men and 44,511 women; 18,073 or 19.74% of its population were urban dwellers at the time. The four largest ethnic groups reported in Mieso were the Oromo (88.09%), the Somali (5.77%), the Amhara (3.46%), and the Argobba (0.66%); all other ethnic groups made up 2.02% of the population. Oromiffa was spoken as a first language by 88.37%, 5.61% spoke Amharic, and 5.29% spoke Somali; the remaining 0.73% spoke all other primary languages reported. The majority of the inhabitants were Moslem, with 95.23% of the population reporting they practiced that belief, while 4.55% of the population said they professed Ethiopian Orthodox Christianity.

This woreda is primarily inhabited by the Oromo from the Ittu clan and the Hawiye from the Somalis, with it being disputed by both regional states, where the Hawiye inhabit the Bordode and Kora areas of the woreda as well as the full Mieso woreda in the Somali Region.
