= Tekle Hawariat Tekle Mariyam =

Ethiopian politician, writer and aristocrat

Fit′awrari Tekle Hawariat Tekle Mariyam
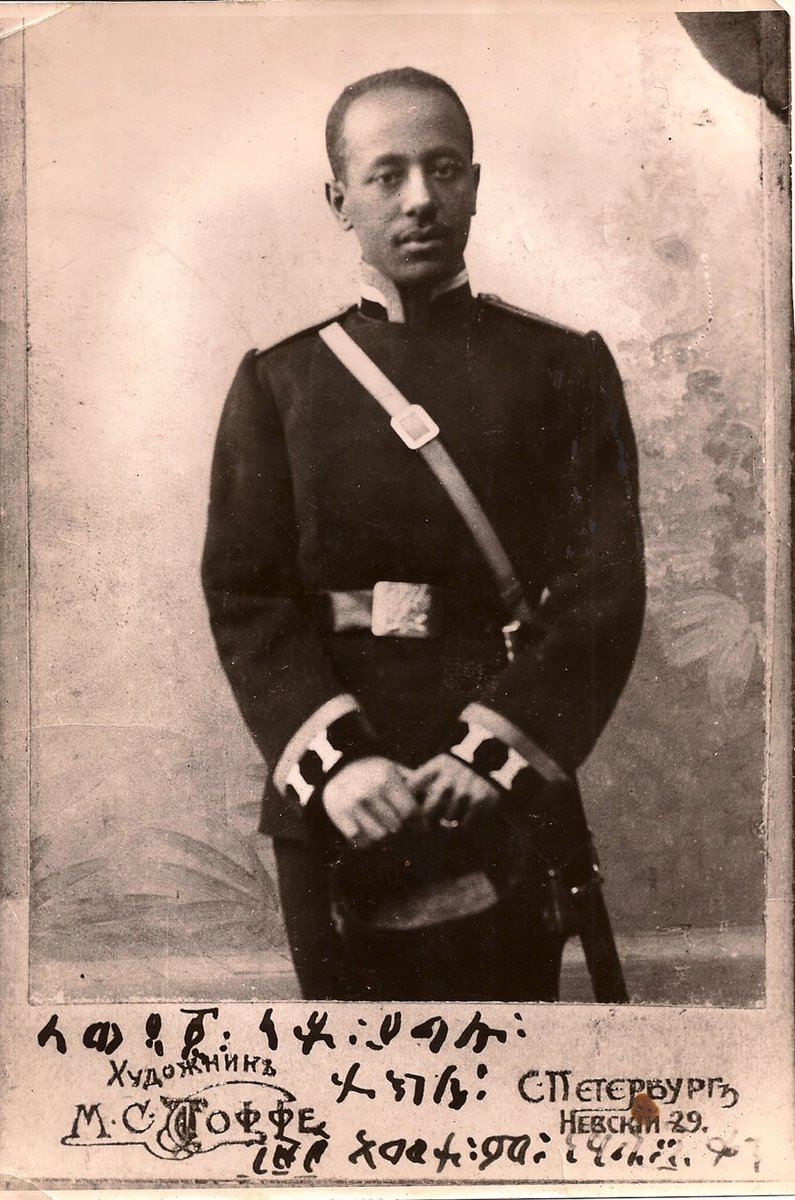
- Tekle Hawariat as a young adult
- Born: June 1884; Seya, Shewa, Ethiopian Empire
- Died: April 1977 (aged 92); Hirna, Hararghe Province, Ethiopia
- Other names: Tekle Hawariat Tekle Mariam; Tekle-Hawariat Tekle-Mariyam; Tekle Hawaryat Tekle Mariam; Tekle-Hawaryat Tekle-Mariyam; Tecle Hawariat
- Citizenship: Ethiopian
- Occupations: Politician, diplomat, military commander and author

Minister of Finance
- In office 1930–1935
- Monarch: Haile Selassie
- Preceded by: Ras Haile Giyorgis Woldemikael
- Succeeded by: Makonnen Habte-Wold

Tekle Hawariat Tekle Mariyam (Amharic: ተክለ ሐዋርዓት ተክለ ማሪያም; June 1884 – April 1977 (Note: The date of his birth is based on Tekle Hawariat's own computations from his unpublished autobiography, while the date of his death is provided by his son Germachew Tekle Hawariat. The dates are in the book Pioneers of Change in Ethiopia pp.57-64 by Bahru Zewde)) was an Ethiopian politician, aristocrat, playwright, director and intellectual. He was the primary author of the 16 July 1931 constitution of Ethiopia, which was influenced by the Japanese Meiji Constitution.

He was also the first playwright in Ethiopia, and pioneer of Ethiopian and African theater.

== Early life ==
Born in the parish of Seya in Shewa into a clerical Amhara family with connections to the nobility. His father died just before his birth, and his uncle and elder brother became responsible for his upbringing, enrolling the boy in an Orthodox Church school when he was six years old. Within a remarkably three short years, the boy was literate and completed the initial stage of Church education that fitted him to aid in Church services. He went to Addis Ababa to be ordained by the Abun.

Tekle Hawariat (nine of age) then moved with his older brother Gebretsadik to Harar. The pair stayed at the house of a relative, who was a retainer in the service of the Governor of Harar, Ras Makonnen Woldemikael. Tekle Hawariat became acquainted with the court of his new patron.

At age 11, and already in possession of an expensive Winchester rifle and 150 bullets and ‘‘vowing to kill 150 Italians’’, the youngster accompanied Ras Makonnen and his brother on the march towards the war front, where they joined the forces of Emperor Menelik II to confront Italy's aggression. His brother Gebretsadik was killed during the conflict. A Russian Red Cross team had come to Ethiopia to care for the wounded. Ras Makonnen entrusted Tekle Hawariat (it's unclear whether the boy was injured) to one of the members of the Russian mission, Count Nikolay Leontiev, to take him to Russia and have him educated and learn about European cultures.

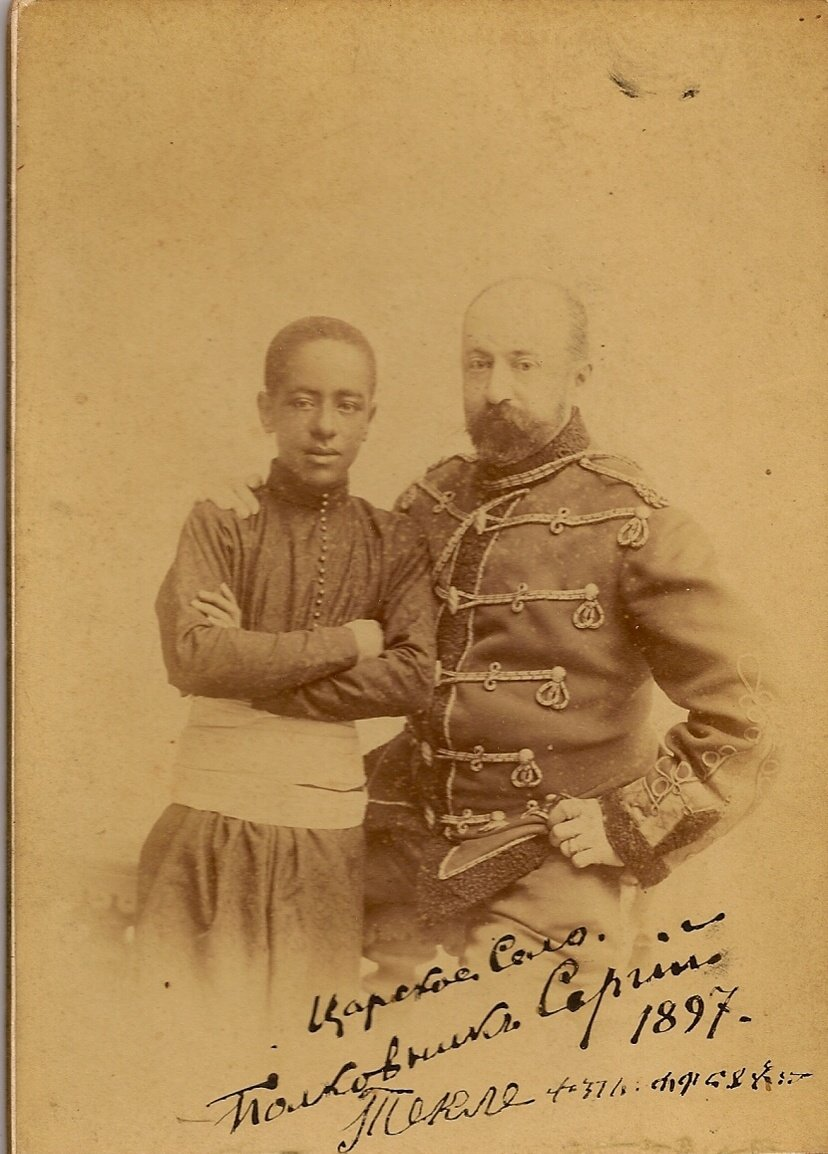
Tekle Hawariat as a child in Russia

== Abroad ==
=== Russia ===
Young Tekle Hawariat would learn much about Russian culture from his adopted family, he was adopted by Colonel Molchanoff, grandson of Prince Sergey Volkonsky, a Decembrist. He graduated in military science and artillery from St Petersburg military school, and later the Mikailovskaia Artillery School.

Tekle Hawariat would rise to the rank of colonel in the Imperial Russian Army.

=== Brief return ===
He briefly returned to Ethiopia in 1909. After a period of idleness; Tekle Hawariat came to the painful realization that Ethiopia had no need for either his training in artillery or his skill in the Russian language and decided to go to France to study agriculture.

=== Europe ===
Tekle Hawariat received grants from Emperor Menelik II to cover his expenses abroad, but he had to supplement them by tutoring Russian children in Paris. He also stayed for some time in England. In both countries he attended theatres as a means of learning the languages.

== Return ==
=== First post ===
Upon his return to Ethiopia in 1912 Tekle Hawariat assumed his first post under Negadras Haile Giyorgis Woldemikael governing the capital Addis Abeba. He developed a plan for municipal reform which included among others; to expand medical access and improve general sanitation. Tekle Hawariat was dismissed for being "too enterprising and independent-minded" and reportedly clashed with the Negadras.

=== Deposing Lij Iyasu ===
Tekle Hawariat tried to curry favor with the young heir apparent Lij Iyasu, in hopes that his progressive reforms would be adopted under the new regent, but Lij Iyasu's incomptence and unstable behavior dashed Tekle Hawariat's hopes and led to his decision to side with Zewditu's faction in removing Lij Iyasu's claim to the throne.

On 27 September 1916 the Shewan nobility issued a proclamation that deposed Lij Iyasu for committing apostasy and treason, following his conversion to Islam. Tekle Hawariat joined in the denunciation of Lij Iyasu as an apostate. Lij Iyasu responded by raising an army in Harar, and marched towards Addis Abeba. Tekle Hawariat assumed command of a 15-thousand strong military force and defeated Lij Iyasu's forces near the railway town of Mieso, forcing Lij Iyasu and his remnants troops to flee back to Harar.

=== Governor of Jijiga ===
Tekle Hawariat relationship with the new regent Ras Tafari (future Emperor Haile Selassie) had an auspicious start, he was appointed governor of Jijiga in 1917 and was distinguished with the noble and military title of Fit′awrari.

His governorship was favorably remembered by the local population who gave him the nicknames of ‘‘Sehiye’’ (Sleeping in Peace) and ‘‘Tahir’’ (Light) after earning a reputation for ‘‘enlightened administration’’ characterised by peace and progress. It's unclear whether Tekle Hawariat quit or was removed from his post; however, in his autobiography he said to have resigned following disagreements with regent Ras Tafari who kept reappointing people he had dismissed for inefficiency.

=== First African play ===
Sometime between 1916 and 1921 (Note: Authorities differ on performance dates for Fabula. Options vary between 1909 and 1921, however since it's Zewditu that gave the banning order, it's likely the play was performed after she became Empress in late 1916) Tekle Hawariat wrote and produced a drama named ‘‘Fabula: Yawreoch Commedia’’ (Fable: The Comedy of Animals). Fabula was Africa's first play and marked the beginning of Ethiopian theatre.

Fabula: Yawreoch Commedia was an Amharic satire based on the fables of La Fontaine. Africa's first play, in the Western sense of a scripted text and performance drawing on an old Ethiopian tradition of animal allegory used animal characters to criticize the corruption and backwardness of the Ethiopian court. Criticism was conveyed subtly through Sam-ena-warq (Wax and Gold) an Amharic poetic form that utilises double entendre and layered meanings thus, conforming with Amhara linguistic conventions since speaking openly was often seen as foolish in a traditional society, and an individual would be admired for the ability to speak obliquely.

Tekle Hawariat drew the ire of Empress Zewditu who clearly saw through the hidden messages and determined that the piece was an attack on her and the crown. She ordered a ban on theatre in Ethiopia and had all the copies of the play confiscated. Fortunately for Tekle Hawariat he was spared from an ill fate by Empress Zewditu because of his noble rank and reputation. The ban order was later lifted by the Emperor Haile Selassie in 1930 and the play was republished and performed once again.

=== Governor of Chercher province ===
In 1923 Tekle Hawariat was appointed to another governorship, this time over the province of Chercher, one of the provinces Ras Tafari was developing as a model of modern government. Chercher proved to be one of Tekle Hawariat's most durable posting. He carried out a series of reforms that dramatically improved the economy of the province.

He introduced (land) taxes and sougt to abolish Zakat, a variant of tithe. One of his top policy priorities was eradicating Khat. The consumption of Khat was seen by the Christian Amharas as an mark of apostasy. Tekle Hawariat ordered the local population to uproot their Khat plants and replace them with coffee trees. Further measures with the objective of discouraging cultivation was raising the land tax on those cultivating the crop and a sales tax on anyone who sold it. The result of these measures was a dramatic increase in revenue.

Tekle Hawariat was able to finance military reorganization due to the new windfalls in revenue, and he put his military training to use by leading a military campaign to restore order among the Afar.

Arguably, his greatest achievement was founding the town of modern-day Chiro then called by the name "Asebe Tafari", a "model-town" which was referred to as "one of the best planned towns in Ethiopia", and the new capital of Chercher province.

However, relations with regent Ras Tafari came increasingly under strain. Tekle Hawariat in his autobiography attributes this to Ras Tafari ‘‘trait’’ towards him, first by allowing him free rein to govern and then creating all sorts of obstacles. Although the regent recognized his enterprise and a dedication to duty, he resented Tekle Hawariat's independent character.

=== Imprisonment ===
In Chercher problems arose when his policy of eradicating Khat became untenable. The cultivation of the crop was still permitted in adjacent provinces and led to the decline in revenues in Chercher, according to Tekle Hawariat, a situation partly created by ‘‘obstructionists sent from Addis Ababa’’. He was accused of self-enrichment and fined a hefty sum of ten thousand Birr.

In 1928, in the wake of a Bolshevik panic that had gripped the capital. Tekle Hawariat (because of his early Russian connections) was arrested on charges of plotting with other Russian residents in the capital, who all were actually White Russians or refugees from the Bolshevik Revolution themselves. The allegations against Tekle Hawariat proved difficult to substantiate, nonetheless he was forced to spend a brief time in jail.

=== First constitution of Ethiopia ===
After being crowned Emperor in 1930, Haile Selassie gave Tekle Hawariat the duty of drafting the first constitution of Ethiopia. Tekle Hawariat did so by consulting the American, English, German, Italian and Japanese constitutions, with clear preponderant influence of the Japanese model; However, his draft was subjected to close scrutiny by the Emperor and his close associates, Ras Kassa Haile Darge and Heruy Welde Sellase who modified Tekle Hawariat's draft ‘‘to meet imperial needs’’. Changes included the legislative powers granted to the parliament were reduced and instead of Tekle Hawariat's proposal that the deputies be elected the final draft made them appointees. Even more significantly, the constitution appears to have had the central objective of restricting the powers of the hereditary aristocrasy.

On 16 July 1931, Ethiopia's first constitution was promulgated.

=== Minister ===
In September 1931, few months after the promulgation of the constitution, Tekle Hawariat became the first foreign-educated Ethiopian to rise to ministerial level. He was given the traditional title of Bäjerond (palace treasurer) and made Minister of Finance. However, his tenure in office was brief. (Note: Duration of his time as Minister of Finance is conflicted by different sources from barely a year, in Pioneers of Change by Bahru Zewde on pp.63 to until 1935 according to webarchived but no longer functional government website)

His most important posting was representing Ethiopia at the League of Nations for many years, most notably at the sessions during the Walwal Incident. However, the uncooperative attitudes of not only the British and French delegates frustrated him so much he asked Emperor Haile Selassie to be relieved so he could return to Ethiopia where he could be of better use using his military training to organize his country's defenses against the unavoidable conflict.

Tekle Hawariat crossed paths with his Emperor one last time, while the other was leaving Ethiopia to make a personal appeal to the League of Nations. When Haile Selassie and his entourage reached Mieso, he was there with his troops; Tekle Hawariat boarded the train. As John Spencer tersely states, "The encounter must have been a bitter one. Spencer happened to be aboard the train five days later which stopped at Afdem, where Tekle Hawariat boarded train and entered Spencer's compartment. "Although I must have been for him an almost complete stranger, he lost no time unburdening himself to me of his thoughts about Haile Selassie, whom he denounced as a traitor to Ethiopia, a coward, and one unworthy to bear the title of Emperor after his flight into exile."

Once he reached Djibouti, he sought an agricultural concession, but the local authorities politely refused him. Tekle Hawariat then moved to Aden, where in September 1937 he petitioned the colonial government in Kenya to resettle there. The authorities refused his request, concerned that his presence would encourage unrest against the Italians. According to Bahru Zewde, Haile Selassie's victorious return to Ethiopia found his one-time ambassador in Madagascar where he prolonged his exile until 1955/56, and upon returning to Ethiopia Tekle Hawariat "retired to the obscurity of a gentleman-farmer's life in Hirna, Hararge."

== Legacy ==
Tekle Hawariat had 8 children, including Germachew Tekle-Hawariat (1915–1987). Educated in Switzerland, Germachew served as a diplomat after Haile Selassie's restoration in 1941, as well as being a noted author, whose works include the novel Araya and a play based on the life of the 19th century Ethiopian emperor Tewodros I.

One day the Emperor Haile Selassie visited the retired Tekle Hawariat. The two men argued, with Haile Selassie telling his former adviser,

Haile Selassie: You keep saying ‘Ethiopia’ but Ethiopia is nothing without me. Her fate is tied up with mine. I am her destiny. Do not imagine Ethiopia will exist without me........ How can you think like that replied a shocked Tekle Hawariat: Ethiopia is eternal. We shall all pass away, but Ethiopia will remain forever!. — An anecdote between Emperor Haile Selassie and Tekle Hawariat Tekle Mariyam,

Tekle Hawariat died at age 92 in April 1977.
