= Kuni (Aanaa) =

District located in eastern Oromia state of Ethiopia

Coordinates: 8°40′N 40°45′E

Kuni Qunnii (Oromo)
- District
- Location within Ethiopia
- Country: Ethiopia
- Region: (Oromia Region) Oromia
- Zone: West Hararghe
- Time zone: UTC+3 (EAT)

Kuni is one of the Aanaas in the Oromia Regional State of Ethiopia. Part of the West Hararghe Zone, Kuni is bordered on the south by Boke, on the west by Habro, on the northeast by Chiro, and on the east by the Galetti River, which separates it from the East Hararghe Zone.

== Overview ==
Khat is an important cash crop of this woreda, but because it is a very perishable commodity and must be cultivated not too far from major markets or good roads, it is grown largely along the main roads. Coffee is another important cash crop of this woreda. Over 50 km^{2} is planted with this crop.

Kuni was selected in 2006 by the Ministry of Agriculture and Rural Development as an area for voluntary resettlement for farmers from overpopulated areas. Along with Boke and Darolebu woredas, Kuni became the new home for 3,308 families.

== Demographics ==
The 2007 national census reported a total population for this woreda of 158,282, of whom 81,029 were men and 77,253 were women; none of its population were urban dwellers. The majority of the inhabitants (86.47%) said they were Muslim, while 13.37% of the population practised Ethiopian Orthodox Christianity.

Based on figures published by the Central Statistical Agency in 2005, this woreda has an estimated total population of 160,813, of whom 78,641 are men and 82,172 are women; 19,361 or 12.04% of its population are urban dwellers, which is greater than the Zone average of 9.6%. With an estimated area of 1,322.50 square kilometers, Kuni has an estimated population density of 121.6 people per square kilometer, which is greater than the Zone average of 101.8.

The 1994 national census reported a total population for this woreda of 113,783, of whom 58,276 were men and 55,507 women; 10,813 or 9.5% of its population were urban dwellers at the time. The two largest ethnic groups reported in Kuni were the Oromo (83.14%), and the Amhara (15.99%); all other ethnic groups made up 0.87% of the population. Oromiffa was spoken as a first language by 81.72%, 17.74% spoke Amharic; the remaining 0.54% spoke all other primary languages reported. The majority of the inhabitants were Moslem, with 81.18% of the population reporting they practiced that belief, while 18.58% of the population said they professed Ethiopian Orthodox Christianity.
