= Tulo =

District located in eastern Oromia state of Ethiopia

Coordinates: 9°10′N 41°00′E

Tulo Tuulo (Oromo)
- District
- Location within Ethiopia
- Country: Ethiopia
- Region: (Oromia Region) Oromia
- Zone: West Hararghe
- Time zone: UTC+3 (EAT)

Tulo is one of the Aanaas in Oromia Regional State of Ethiopia. Part of the West Hararghe Zone, Tulo is bordered on to the north by Doba, to the south by Masela, to the east by the East haraghe Zone, and to the west by Nannawa Chiro. Towns in Tulo include Debeso and Hirna.

Coffee is an important cash crop of this woreda, with over 50 square kilometers being planted with the crop. Circa 2000, a team of workers sponsored by Chinese aid built most of a new all-weather road between Awash and Hirna.

== Demographics ==
The 2007 national census reported this woreda's population as 147,384, of whom 75,254 were men and 72,130 women; 13,768 or 9.34% of its population were urban dwellers. The majority of the inhabitants (78.72% ) said they were Muslim, while 20.04% of the population practised Ethiopian Orthodox Christianity.

Based on figures published by the Central Statistical Agency in 2005, this woreda has an estimated total population of 165,711, of whom 81,288 are men and 84,423 are women; 19,864 or 11.99% of its population are urban dwellers, which is greater than the Zone average of 9.6%. With an estimated area of 423.6 square kilometers, Tulo has an estimated population density of 391.2 people per square kilometer, which is greater than the Zone average of 101.8.

The 1994 national census reported a total population for this woreda of 117,273, of whom 59,927 were men and 57,346 women; 11,103 or 9.47% of its population were urban dwellers at the time. The two largest ethnic groups reported in Tulo were the Oromo (78.67%), and the Amhara (20.46%); all other ethnic groups made up 0.87% of the population. Oromiffa was spoken as a first language by 79.61%, and 19.96% spoke Amharic; the remaining 0.43% spoke all other primary languages reported. The majority of the inhabitants were Moslem, with 76.51% of the population reporting they practiced that belief, while 23.04% of the population said they professed Ethiopian Orthodox Christianity.
