= Tulo (disambiguation) =

Tulo is a woreda (administrative division) of Ethiopia.

Tulo or TULO may also refer to:

- nickname of Troy Tulowitzki (born 1984), American Major League Baseball player
- Manueli Tulo (born 1990), Fijian weightlifter
- Tulo, former name of Milagrosa, Calamba, Philippines, a neighbourhood of the city of Calamba
- Trade Union and Labour Party Liaison Organisation (TULO), a labour organisation in the United Kingdom
