= Badeno (Aanaa) =

District located in eastern Oromia state of Ethiopia

Coordinates: 9°00′N 41°30′E

Badeno baddannoo (Oromo)
- District
- Location within Ethiopia
- Country: Ethiopia
- Region: (Oromia Region) Oromia
- Zone: East Hararghe
- Time zone: UTC+3 (EAT)

Bedeno (Oromo: Aanaa Baddannoo) is a District of Ethiopia in Oromia, Ethiopia. It is named after the administrative center of the district, Bedeno. Part of the East Hararghe Zone, Bedeno is bordered on the south by Gola Odana Meyumuluke, on the southwest by Malka Balo, on the west by Deder, on the northwest by Meta, on the north by Jarso, on the northeast by Kurfa Chele, and on the east by Girawa. Towns include Furda.

== Overview ==
The altitude of this woreda ranges from 1200 to 3100 meters above sea level; Aniya Geneme is the highest point. Rivers include the Deneba and the Ramis. A survey of the land in this woreda (released in 1995–96) shows that 21% is arable or cultivable, 3.8% pasture, 14.3% forest, 6.5% built-up, and the remaining 54.4% is considered marshy, degraded or otherwise unusable. The Goda Jini Caves are a local landmark. Khat, fruits and vegetables are important cash crops. Coffee is also an important cash crop; over 50 square kilometers are planted with it. Coffee from Bedeno is well known for its high quality.

Industry in the woreda includes 13 grain mills and one brick factory employing 88 people, as well as 174 registered businesses including wholesalers, retailers and service providers. There were 38 Farmers Associations with 40,659 members and 3 Farmers Service Cooperatives with 2442 members. Bedeno has 104 kilometers of dry-weather and 62 of all-weather road, for an average road density of 157 kilometers per 1000 square kilometers. About 6.9% of the rural and 18.5% of the urban population have access to drinking water.

== Demographics ==
The 2007 national census reported a total population for this woreda of 238,966, of whom 120,521 were men and 118,445 were women; 9,118 or 3.82% of its population were urban dwellers. The majority of the inhabitants said they were Muslim, with 97.35% of the population reporting they observed this belief, while 2.35% of the population practised Ethiopian Orthodox Christianity.

Based on figures published by the Central Statistical Agency in 2005, this woreda has an estimated total population of 242,835, of whom 121,083 are men and 121,752 are women; 7,978 or 3.29% of its population are urban dwellers, which is less than the Zone average of 6.9%. With an estimated area of 1,055.16 square kilometers, Bedeno has an estimated population density of 230.1 people per square kilometer, which is greater than the Zone average of 102.6.

The 1994 national census reported a total population for this woreda of 175,407, of whom 88,421 were men and 86,986 women; 4,460 or 2.54% of its population were urban dwellers at the time. (This total also includes an estimate for the inhabitants of several rural kebeles, which were not counted; they were estimated to have 9,417 inhabitants, of whom 4,738 were men and 4,679 women.) The two largest ethnic groups reported in Bedeno were the Oromo (97.74%), and the Amhara (2.18%); all other ethnic groups made up 0.08% of the population. Oromo was spoken as a first language by 97.61%, and 2.35% spoke Amharic; the remaining 0.04% spoke all other primary languages reported. The majority of the inhabitants were Muslim, with 97.31% of the population having reported they practiced that belief, while 2.59% of the population said they professed Ethiopian Orthodox Christianity.mibextid
