= Sheikh Umar Aliye =

Sheikh Umar Aliye, popularly known as Gelemsiyyi, was an Islamic religious leader in Gelemso, Ethiopia.

He was another key figure in the Islamization of the Ittu Oromo and a father of Mohammed Zakir Meyra and many more heroes and scholars. Perhaps, he is the most widely known scholar, activist and important Islam figure in the region. In fact, he is well known for his dedication for Islam and its teaching throughout the country. He is also the most noted figure in the transmission of the Qadiriyyah Sufi brotherhood (Tariqa), which he introduced to the Harar Oromos with Sheikh Mohammed Harar, his close friend with whom he returned from Wallo after the completion of higher education. He built the biggest mosque and hadira (a complex where people are gathering to pray day and night).Sheikh Umar Aliye, popularly known as Gelemsiyyi, was an Islamic religious leader in Gelemso, Ethiopia.
