= Talha Jafar =

Argobba rebel in Ethiopia (died 1936)

Talha bin Jafar

Personal life
- Born: 1853 Wollo Province, Ethiopia
- Died: 1934 (aged 80–81) Chiro, Hararghe, Ethiopia
- Era: 19th-20th century
- Region: Horn of Africa
- Main interest(s): Hadith, Fiqh

Religious life
- Religion: Islam
- Denomination: Sunni
- Tariqa: Mahdi

Talha bin Jafar was a nineteenth century Argobba-Ethiopian rebel in Ifat and later governor of Wadessa, Hararghe in Ethiopia. He belonged to the Mahdi Sufi tariqa.

== Militant career ==
Beginning in 1879, he spearheaded a resistance movement against the Abyssinian emperors Yohannes IV and subsequently Menelik II, in response to the state's antagonistic policies towards Muslims in the region. Talha's assaults on villages were characterized as catastrophic due to his implementation of a scorched earth approach. According to historian Abdussamad Ahmad, his militia expanded significantly as persecuted Muslims from various regions of Abyssinia, joined his ranks. At first Mikael of Wollo did not take Talha's revolt seriously and dismissed him as merely an individual intoxicated by the narcotic chat leaf, however Mikael was proven wrong when Talha's forces managed to defeat an army sent to quell the rebellion.

Talha was part of the Mahdist Sudanese invasion of Ethiopia which had sacked several major towns including Gonder. In the late 1800s he also collaborated with the Italians against Menelik II.

== Political career ==
During the reign of Lij Iyasu, he was appointed governor of Wadessa in the Hararghe region of Chercher. Talha also participated in a diplomatic delegation tasked with engaging rebel leader Mohammed Abdullah in cooperating.

== See also ==
- Hassan Enjamo, rebel leader of Hadiya
