= Doba (woreda) =

District in Oromia Region, Ethiopia

Doba Dadar (Oromo)
- Woreda
- Interactive map of Doba
- Location within Ethiopia
- Coordinates: 9°15′N 41°00′E
- Country: Ethiopia
- Region: Oromia
- Zone: West Hararghe

Population (2007 est.)
  - Total: 133,939

Doba is a woreda in Oromia Region, Ethiopia. It is named after its major town Doba. Part of the West Haraghe, Doba is bordered on the south by Chiro, on the west by Mieso, on the north by the Somali Region, on the east by the East Hararghe, and on the southeast by Tulo.

== Overview ==
Although coffee is an important cash crop of this woreda, less than 20 square kilometers are planted with this crop.

In October 2004, a referendum was held in about 420 kebeles in 12 woredas across five zones of the Somali Region to settle the boundary between Oromia and the adjacent Somali Region. According to the official results of the referendum, about 80% of the disputed areas have fallen under Oromia administration, though there were numerous allegations of voting irregularities in many of them. The results led over the following weeks to minorities in these kebeles being pressured to leave. Doba authorities reported 12,000 refugees had fled to their woreda, requesting immediate relief support from NGOs. By late February, the Zonal authorities planned to aid 16,615 refugees in five kebeles, although the Federal Disaster Prevention and Preparation Committee provided assistance to only 5,000 people.

== Demographics ==
The 2007 national census reported a total population for this woreda of 133,939, of whom 68,512 were men and 65,427 were women; 3,272 or 2.44% of its population were urban dwellers. The majority of the inhabitants (88.47%) said they were Muslim, while 10.04% of the population practised Ethiopian Orthodox Christianity.

Based on figures published by the Central Statistical Agency in 2005, this woreda had an estimated total population of 126,840, of whom 61,983 are men and 64,857 are women; 1,951 or 1.54% of its population comprises urban dwellers, which is less than the Zone average of 9.6%. With an estimated area of 700.47 square kilometers, Doba has an estimated population density of 181.1 people per square kilometer, which is greater than the Zone average of 101.8.

The 1994 national census reported a total population for this woreda of 92,003, of whom 47,306 were men and 44,697 women; 1,088 or 1.18% of its population were urban dwellers at the time. The two largest ethnic groups reported in Doba were the Oromo (88.88%), and the Amhara (11.02%); all other ethnic groups made up 0.1% of the population. Oromiffa was spoken as a first language by 89.83%, and 10.14% spoke Amharic; the remaining 0.03% spoke other primary languages reported. The majority of the inhabitants were Muslim, with 86.14% of the population reporting they practiced that belief, while 12.63% of the population said they professed Ethiopian Orthodox Christianity, and 1.09% were Catholic.
