= Asabot =

Town in northeastern Ethiopia

Asabot is a town in eastern Ethiopia. Named after a nearby mountain, this town is located in the West Hararghe Zone of the Oromia Region, with a latitude and longitude of 9°15′N 40°34′E. It is served by a railway station on the Addis Ababa - Djibouti Railway.

Between 1954 and 1967 telephone service reached the town. Mobile telephone service was introduced to Asabot May 2009. A local landmark is the church, dedicated to Kidist Selassie ("Holy Trinity"), which was decorated with paintings by the artist Emailaf Heruy in the 1930s.

Based on figures from the Central Statistical Agency in 2005, this town has an estimated total population of 13,130, of whom 6,767 are men and 6,363 are women. The 1994 national census reported Asabot had a total population of 7,335, of whom 3,670 were men and 3,665 were women. It is one of five towns in Mieso woreda.

Asabot has a 13th-century monastery near the mountain called asabot Gedam Monastery.
