= Mieso =

Mieso Mi'eessoo (Oromo)
- Town
- Location within Ethiopia Mieso (Africa)
- Coordinates: 09°14′N 40°45′E
- Country: Ethiopia
- Region: Oromia
- Zone: West Hararghe Zone
- Elevation: 1,394 m (4,573 ft)

Population (2005)
  - Total: 21,348
- Time zone: UTC+3 (EAT)

Mieso (Oromo: Mi'eesso) is a town in eastern Ethiopia. Located in the West Hararghe Zone of the Oromia Region, it has a latitude and longitude of 9°14′N 40°45′E with an elevation of 1394 meters above sea level.

== Overview ==
A road was constructed connecting the town with the railroad station at Chiro in the 1930s. By the 1930s, Mieso was the most important railway stations of the Franco-Ethiopian Railway between Dire Dawa and Awash. It is now a station stop on the new Addis Ababa–Djibouti Railway. Mobile telephone service was introduced to Mieso May 2009.

Based on figures from the Central Statistical Agency in 2005, this town has an estimated total population of 10,328 of whom 5,342 were males and 4,986 were females. The 1994 national census reported this town had a total population of 5,769 of whom 2,897 were males and 2,872 were females. It is the administrative center and one of five towns in Mieso woreda.

== History ==
One of the earliest mentions of Mieso was in 1907, when the German delegation of Friedrich Rosen passed Mieso that year on their way to the coast. Near Mieso was where Lij Iyasu and his troops, returning to Addis Ababa to deal with the coup that cost him his throne, were defeated in October 1916 by an army led by half a dozen Shewan notables and driven back.

During the Italian occupation, a mosque was built for the local Muslim community.

The Addis Tribune reported 5 January 2001 that 13 people died and 19 sustained light injuries when a train heading to Addis Ababa derailed and overturned near Mieso a few days prior on New Year's Eve. The train reportedly separated into three parts. A number of persons were travelling illegally on the train's freight compartments when the accident occurred.

Numerous conflicts between the local Oromos and Somalis in Mieso followed the October 2004 referendum to establish the disputed boundary between the Oromia and Somali Regions; 2,500 people displaced from their homes in December 2004 had sought refuge at Mieso. NGOs working in the area reported conflicts as late as 14 July 2005.

== Demographics ==
This town is primarily inhabited by the Oromo people from the Ittu, Nole and Jarso clans. There are also Somalis from mostly the Hawiye clan as well as from the Issa clan present.

== See also ==
- Railway stations in Ethiopia
