= Girawa (Aanaa) =

District located in eastern Oromia state of Ethiopia

Coordinates: 8°55′N 41°40′E

Giraawa Giraawa (Oromo)
- District
- Location within Ethiopia
- Country: Ethiopia
- Region: (Oromia Region) Oromia
- Zone: East Hararghe
- Time zone: UTC+3 (EAT)

Girawa (also called Girawa Meyu Mulike; Oromo: Aanaa Giraawaa) is one of the Districts in the Oromia regional state of Ethiopia. Part of the East Hararghe Zone, Girawa is bordered on the south by Gola Odana Meyu Muluke, on the west by Bedeno, on the north by Kurfa Chele, and on the east by Fedis. The administrative center of the woreda is Girawa; other towns include Megala.

== Overview ==
The altitude of this District ranges from 500 to 3230 meters above sea level; Geyle is the highest point; other significant peaks include Mount Gara Muleta. A survey of the land in Girawa (released in 1996) shows that 54.3% is arable or cultivable, 4.4% pasture, 1.2% forest, 21.8% built-up, and the remaining 18.3% is considered degraded or otherwise unusable. Khat, fruits and vegetables are important cash crops. Coffee is also an important cash crop; over 5,000 hectares are planted with it.

Industry in the District includes 14 grain mills employing 45 people, as well as 95 registered businesses including wholesalers, retailers and service providers. Deposits of feldspar, mica and amazonite are known, but they have not been developed. There were 46 Farmers Associations with 43,373 members and 4 Farmers Service Cooperatives with 4965 members. Girawa has 75 kilometers of dry-weather and 12 of all-weather road, for an average road density of 60.3 kilometers per 1000 square kilometers. About 21.8% of the urban and 3.2% of the rural population have access to drinking water.

Girawa gained publicity in early April 1999, when the media learned of a bloody war between lions and spotted hyenas in the lowlands in the Gobele wilderness, southeast of the administrative center for the District. What initially was thought to be a delayed April's Fool Joke drew attention from the international press, while Ethiopian Television thrilled its viewers with footage showing the carnivores fighting. In its April 20 issue, the Ethiopian Herald said that after the situation "returned to normal", the death toll stood at 6 lions and 35 hyenas – the felines apparently having gained the victory. A local inhabitant was quoted as saying the lion-versus-hyena war was an "old blood feud" going back 45 years, when a lion escaped from emperor Haile Selassie’s palace menagerie in Harar and wreaked havoc on a hyena family; since then the hyenas have sought to extract vengeance on the lions.

== Demographics ==
The 2007 national census reported a total population for this District of 240,173, of whom 121,751 were men and 118,422 were women; 5,893 or 2.45% of its population were urban dwellers. The majority of the inhabitants said they were Muslim, with 98.38% of the population reporting they observed this belief, while 1.44% of the population practised Ethiopian Orthodox Christianity.

Based on figures published by the Central Statistical Agency in 2005, this woreda has an estimated total population of 247,992, of whom 121,416 were men and 126,576 were women; 7,767 or 3.13% of its population are urban dwellers, which is less than the Zone average of 6.9%. With an estimated area of 1,442.19 square kilometers, Girawa has an estimated population density of 172 people per square kilometer, which is greater than the Zone average of 102.6.

The 1994 national census reported a total population for this District of 179,213, of whom 91,958 were men and 87,255 women; 4,340 or 2.42% of its population were urban dwellers at the time. (This total also includes an estimate for the inhabitants of one rural kebele, which were not counted; they were estimated to have 26,745 inhabitants, of whom 13,467 were men and 13,278 women.) The two largest ethnic groups reported in Girawa were the Oromo (97.56%), and the Amhara (2.31%); all other ethnic groups made up 0.13% of the population. Oromo was spoken as a first language by 97.46%, and 2.48% spoke Amharic; the remaining 0.06% spoke all other primary languages reported. The majority of the inhabitants were Muslim, with 97.34% of the population having reported they practiced that belief, while 2.56% of the population said they professed Ethiopian Orthodox Christianity.
