= Gamachis =

District in Oromia Region, Ethiopia

Gamachis Gammachiis (Oromo)
- Woreda
- Country: Ethiopia
- Region: (Oromia Region) Oromia
- Zone: West Hararghe
- Time zone: UTC+3 (EAT)

Gamachis is one of the woredas in the Oromia Region of Ethiopia. It is part of the West Hararghe Zone. It was part of former Chiro. Today, the capital of the woreda is called Kuni. It is located 20 miles from Chiro.

The city is located on the top of a hill and its climate is 70% cold and cloudy. Gemechis woreda has many small cities located 20–45 miles away from each other. Sogido, Sire, Metadhab, and Degaga are the major ones. Transportation for commuting is a major problem of the woreda.

== Demographics ==
The 2007 national census reported a total population for this woreda of 184,238, of whom 93,766 were men and 90,472 women; 3,863 or 2.1% of its population were urban dwellers. The majority of the inhabitants (90.1%) said they were Muslim, while 9.64% of the population practiced Ethiopian Orthodox Christianity.
