= Addis Ababa–Jimma Expressway =

Planned toll road connecting Addis Ababa and Jimma in Ethiopia

Route information
- Length: 345.5 km (214.7 mi)

Location
- Country: Ethiopia

Highway system
- Transport in Ethiopia

The Addis Ababa–Jimma Expressway is a planned toll road that will connect Addis Ababa to Jimma in the Oromia Region of Ethiopia. It is among the major expressway projects being developed as part of Ethiopia's national road expansion program. The road is being developed under a public-private partnership framework, with the Government of Ethiopia seeking private capital investment for its construction and operation, which is estimated to cost $2.03 billion. The highway, spanning an estimated 345.5-kilometre (214.7 mi) in length, aims to reduce congestion and improve connectivity between Addis Ababa and the Oromia Region. Upon completion, it is expected to significantly cut travel time between the two cities compared to the existing route.

== Junctions ==
The Addis Ababa–Jimma Expressway is part of Ethiopia's broader expressway network, which the government is developing through private capital investment. The proposal for the expressway has already been submitted to the Ministry of Finance's Public-Private Partnership Board for review and approval. The expressway will connect Addis Ababa to Jimma in the Oromia Region, serving as a key corridor for trade and passenger movement along the southwestern route out of the capital.
