= Wolle Chekol =

Ethiopian statesman (1941–2005)

Minister of Finance
- In office 1966–1968

Minister of Foreign Trade
- In office 1979–1987

Personal details
- Born: Gojjam
- Education: Haile Selassie I University, Addis Ababa

Wolle Chekol (1941–2005) was an Ethiopian statesman whose positions included Minister of Finance, Minister of Foreign Trade, and Deputy Prime Minister. He was born in Gojjam, where he completed his elementary and secondary education. He earned his BA degree in economics from Haile Selassie I University, Addis Ababa with distinction, and later earned an MA in Economics from the Center for Development Economics, Massachusetts, United States.

== Government positions held ==
- Deputy Prime Minister of Ethiopia (1989–1991)
- Minister, Ministry of Finance (1986–1988)
- Minister, Ministry of Foreign Trade (1979–1987)
- Head, Foreign Economic Relations, National Central Planning Office
- Head, Economic Relations Department, Ministry of Foreign Affairs
- Served as senior expert in the development commission of Ethiopia
- Member of the Shengo.

== Bilateral functions (1970–1991) ==
- Ethio-Italian Economic and Technical Commission, Co-chairman
- Ethio-Chinese Economic and Technical Commission, Co-chairman
- Ethio-Yemen Economic and Technical Commission, Co-chairman
- Ethio-Djibouti Economic and Technical Commission, Co-chairman
- Ethio-Yugoslav Economic and Technical Commission, Co-chairman
- Ethio-Czechoslovak Economic and Technical Commission, Co-chairman
- Ethio-USSR Economic and Technical Commission, Co-chairman

== Multilateral functions (1970–1991) ==
- Africa Group vice chairman at the 1976 United Nations Conference on Trade and Development (UNCTAD)
- Africa Group chairman at the 6th United Nations Conference on Trade
- Africa Group Chairman at the Group of 77 (G77) Conferences
- Chairman, African Ministers of Trade
- Chairman, African Ministers of Finance
- Chaired various international conferences at the United Nations Economic Commission for Africa (UNECA).

== Private business ==
- General Manager, Micro and Small Enterprise Development Program (MSEDP) Ethiopia
- Founding Partner and Deputy General Manager, Afroconsult PLC, Ethiopia
- Founding Partner and Deputy General Manager Afroconsult PLC
