= Chercher (province) =

Former province in eastern Ethiopia

Chercher (sometimes spelled Charchar) was a province in Hararghe (eastern Ethiopia) now part of Oromia Region, Ethiopia. Also known as Ittuu and West Hararghe, Chercher is the name given mainly to the eastern escarpment highland areas of Oromia state's West Hararaghe Zone, where the chains of Checher or higher mountains rise and extend inland from the Great Rift Valley in its northwest. The capital of the former Chercher province was Chiro.

== Etymology ==
Chercher may originate from cer, the Harari word meaning “a cliff that creates a deep gorge.”

== History ==
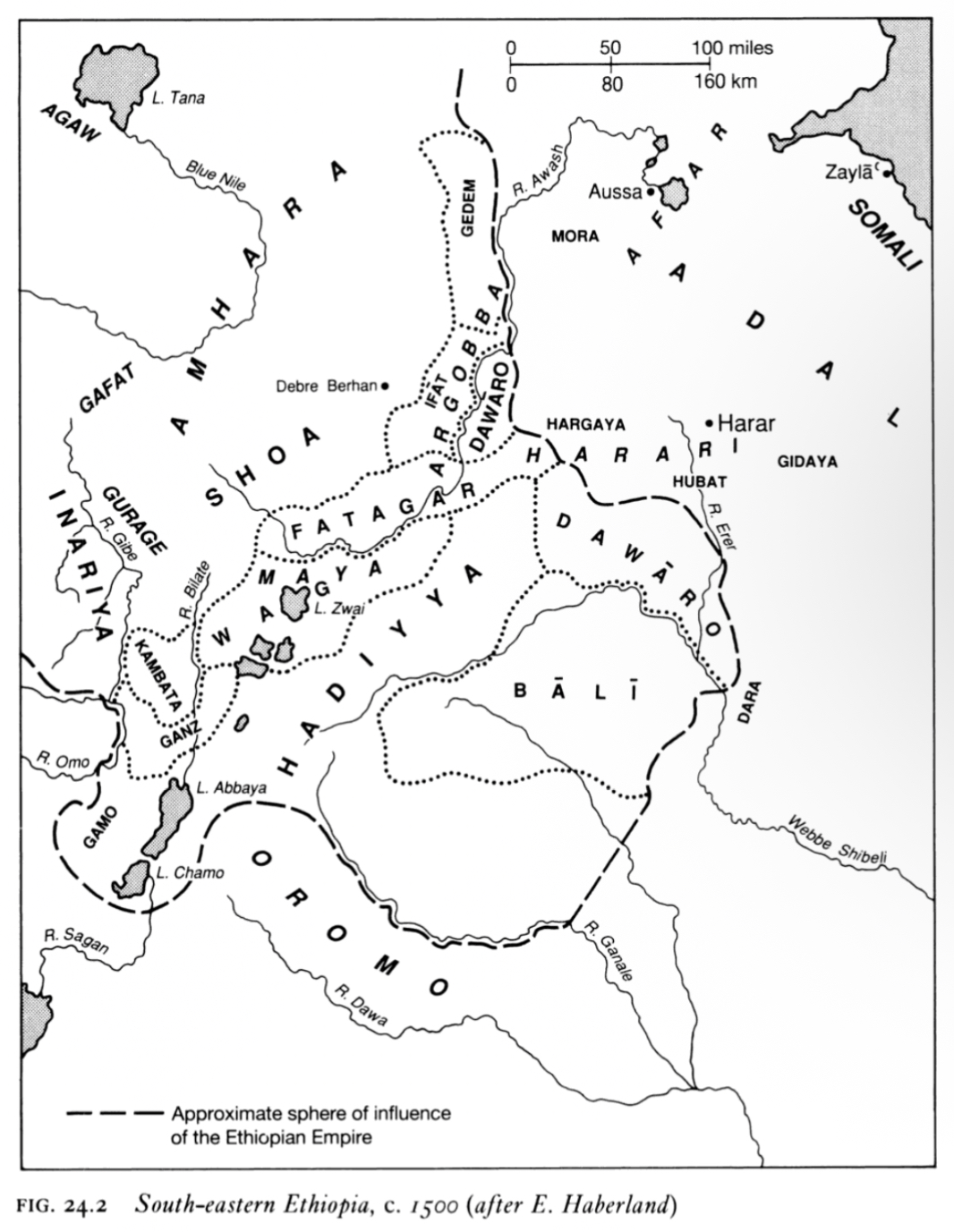
Harari region in the middle ages by Bethwell Allan Ogot

Chercher was a significant area for the ivory trade, as the Harla people hunted elephants in the region. In the fifteenth century it was part of the Adal Sultanate. In the 1500s, amidst the Oromo invasions, the Barento effectively took control of the area, as a result numerous denizens reportedly fled towards the Red Sea. Barento subclan Ittu had occupied the Chercher region from the Harari people and likely also Harla. According to Silt'e tradition, by 1560 most of their population had also vanished from Chercher.

British deputy W.C Barker in 1842 states Chercher was a full day expedition from Harar city and was inhabited by the Oromo people. According to nineteenth century French trader Charles-Xavier Rochet d'Héricourt, numerous coffee growers resided in the Ittu region of Chercher, from where they would subsequently transport their products to Abyssinia or Harar. The chronicle of the Emirate of Harar from the nineteenth century suggests that a Malak was present in Chercher, indicating that the Emirate held some degree of authority in the area. After the Egyptian invasion of Harar in 1874, the Khedivate of Egypt official Rauf Pasha noted that the trade routes controlled by Ittu were not secure and there was animosity directed towards the Egyptians. From 1883 to 1885 the Shewan forces under Menelik attempted to invade the Chercher but were defeated by the Ittu Oromo. In 1886 the Abyssinians of Shewa also suffered a defeat at the Battle of Hirna against the forces of Harar Emirate in the Chercher region. Twentieth century Ethiopian writer Afevork Ghevre Jesus describing the Abyssinian annexation of this region states:

In the Past, the dominion of Abba Danaw [Menelik II] had for its feet Wällo and for its navel Shewa; then it began to expand itself and to stretch its left wing toward Kaffa. The horse of Abba Danaw aiming its head toward Charchar [Eastern Harar], it didn’t sweat, the sun didn’t burn him, the desert didn’t cause him to sweat, the descents didn’t tire him, the slopes didn’t hold him back and he started to fly, to thunder and to pass saying: “the land is not enough for me, the lowlands are narrow.'

In the early 1900s, the former Ifat rebel leader Talha Jafar passed his later years in Chercher as the appointed governor of Wadessa during the reign of Lij Iyasu. In the year 1923 regent Ras Tafari appointed Fit′awrari Tekle Hawariat Tekle Mariyam as governor of Chercher, a year later governor Tekle Hawariat founded the town of Chiro (known then under its old name Asebe Tafari.) and the new capital of the province. In the early 1970s, Chercher became the initial location where the Oromo Liberation Front began its armed struggle.

== Ruins ==
Ancient dolmen from the Middle Bronze Age is found in the region. Archaeologists in Chercher also discovered tumuli from the 8-11th century. The ruins are attributed to the Harla people in the district of Doba located in modern east Oromia. It was home to the people of Doba region prior to the Oromo invasions. According to tradition the ruins of Sharif Ahmed mosque, who was a chief of Harla is found in the Doba district of Chercher. Pottery found in the region is linked to those located in Harlaa, Harar and Somaliland.

== See also ==
- Chelenqo, town in Chercher
