= Harawacha =

Town located in eastern Oromia state of Ethiopia

Harawacha Harawaaca (Oromo)
- Town
- Arauacia
- Location within Ethiopia
- Coordinates: 9°10′6.72″N 41°21′9.14″E
- Country: Ethiopia
- Region: Oromia
- Zone: East Hararghe
- Woreda: Malka Balo
- Time zone: UTC+3 (EAT)
- Climate: Cwb

Harawacha (Oromo: Harawaaca) is a town located in the East Hararghe Zone of the Oromia, Ethiopia. It is one the town of the Malka Balo District.
