= Haile Giyorgis Woldemikael =

Ethiopian senior official

Negadras Haile Giyorgis Woldemikael

Ministry of Foreign Affairs
- In office 1907–1910
- Preceded by: post established
- Succeeded by: Yigezu Behabte

Minister of Finance
- In office 1915–1917
- Monarch: Zewditu
- Preceded by: Ras Mulugeta Yeggazu
- Succeeded by: Fitawrari Tekle Hawariat Tekle Mariyam

Personal details
- Occupation: Politician; diplomat

Bitwoded Haile Giyorgis Wolde Mikael was a senior Ethiopia government official who, holding the office of Negadras or chief of merchants, by 1906 supervised foreign businesses and diplomatic missions in the capital, Addis Ababa, as well as the responsibility of granting concessions and contracts to foreign enterprises, making the post the de facto Mayor of Addis Ababa, as well as its Chief of police, the Minister of Commerce and Minister of Foreign Affairs. These functions were separated by the formation of the first cabinet in 1907, with Haile Giyorgis appointed to those posts de jure. He was minister of finance from 1915 to 1917.

With Haile Giyorgis' removal from office by then-Regent Ras Tafari Makonnen in 1917, the post of Negadras of Addis Ababa lost most of its powers to the office of Kantiba, the head of the municipal government, which had been created in 1910, with other towns later following suit.
