= Meyumuluke =

Administrative division of Ethiopia

Meyu Muluke woreda (district) is one of the 19 woredas in East Hararghe province in the Oromia Zone (region with 180 woredas) of Ethiopia. Meyu Muluke woreda is composed of approximately 124 villages (divided into 19 kebeles) and an estimated population of 54,496 inhabitants1. With 14.8 % of children between 6 and 59 months (8,087 children).The altitude of this woreda ranges from 500-1700 meters above sea level.

== Demographics ==
The 2007 national census reported a total population for this woreda of 46,210, of whom 23,400 were men and 22,810 were women; 3,186 or 6.9% of its population were urban dwellers. The majority of the inhabitants said they were Muslim, with 99.48% of the population reporting they observed this belief.

This woreda is primarily inhabited by the Oromo people and the Somalis from the Hawiye clan.
