= Ministry of Finance and Economic Development (Ethiopia) =

Government ministry of Ethiopia

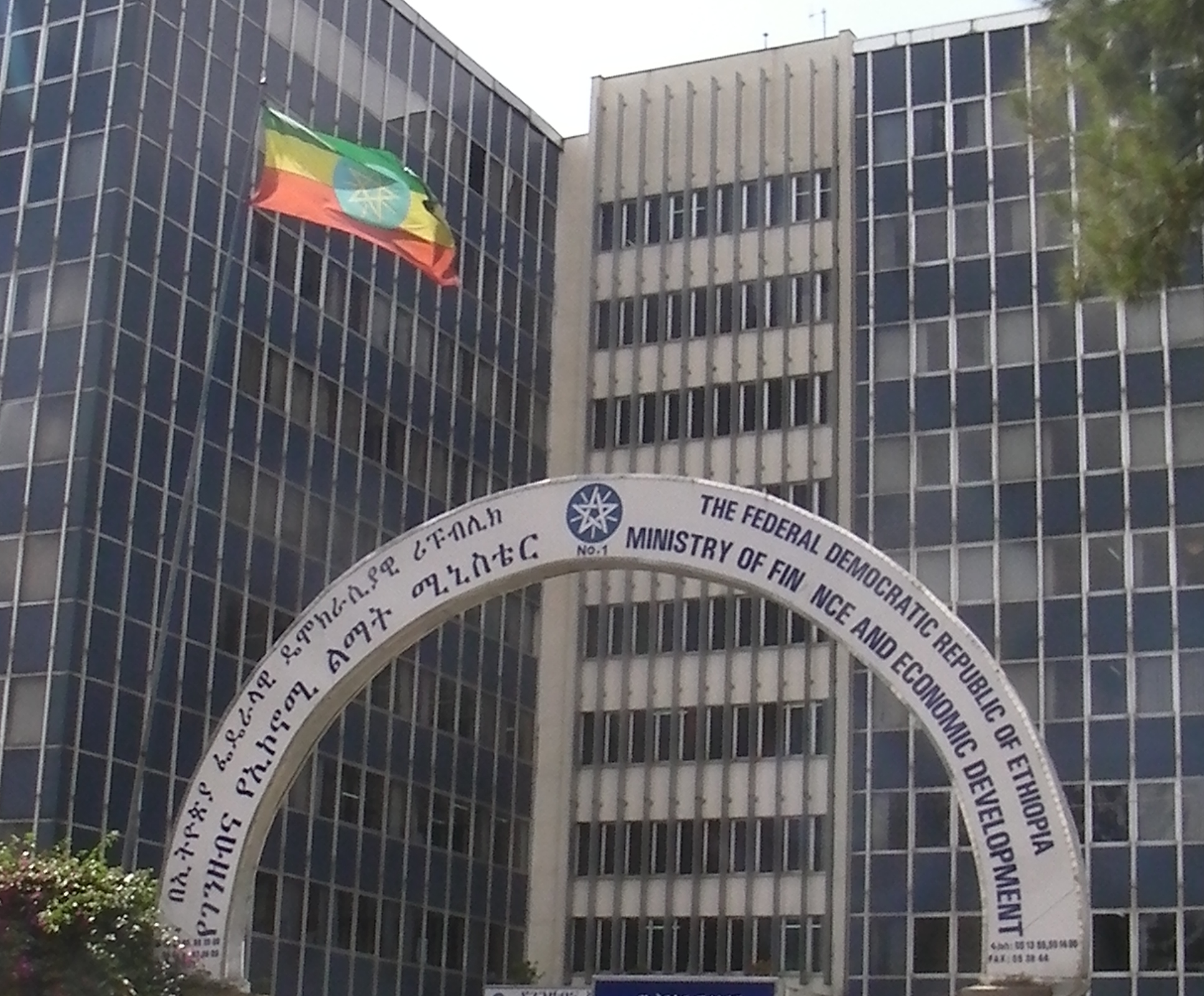
- The Ministry of Finance and Economic Development building in Addis Ababa

Ministry overview
- Formed: 1907
- Jurisdiction: Ethiopian government
- Headquarters: King George VI St, Addis Ababa, Ethiopia; 9.041340°N 38.761338°E
- Minister responsible: Fitsum Assefa, Minister of Finance and Economic Cooperation
- Parent department: Ministry of Peace
- Website: www.mofed.gov.et

The Ministry of Finance and Economic Development is an Ethiopian government department. It is responsible for general financial management and economic policy of Ethiopia, in addition to the allocation of economic assistance. Formerly the Ministry of Finance, it has its origins in the ministerial system introduced by Emperor Menelik II in 1907.

== List of ministers ==
1. Ras Mulugeta Yeggazu 1907-1915
2. Ras Bitweded Haile Giyorgis Woldemikael 1915-1917
3. Fitawrari Tekle Hawariat Tekle Mariyam 1930-1935
4. Makonnen Habte-Wold 1941-1957
5. Yilma Deressa 1957-1970
6. Mahtema Selassie Wolde Meskel 1960 (a few months)
7. Mamo Taddesse 1970-1973
8. Negash Desta 1974-1976
9. Teferra Wolde-Semait 1976-1982
10. Tesfaye Dinka 1983-1986
11. Bekele Tamirat 1986 (15 days)
12. Wolle Chekol 1986-1988
13. Tekolla Dejene 1988-1990
14. Woldemariam Girma 1990 (a few months)
15. Alemayehu Dhaba 1990-1994
16. Sufian Ahmed 1994–2016
17. Abdulaziz Mohammed 2016
18. Abraham Tekeste 2016-2018
19. Ahmed Shide 2018–2026
20. Fitsum Assefa 2026–Present

== See also ==
- Central Statistical Agency (Ethiopia)
