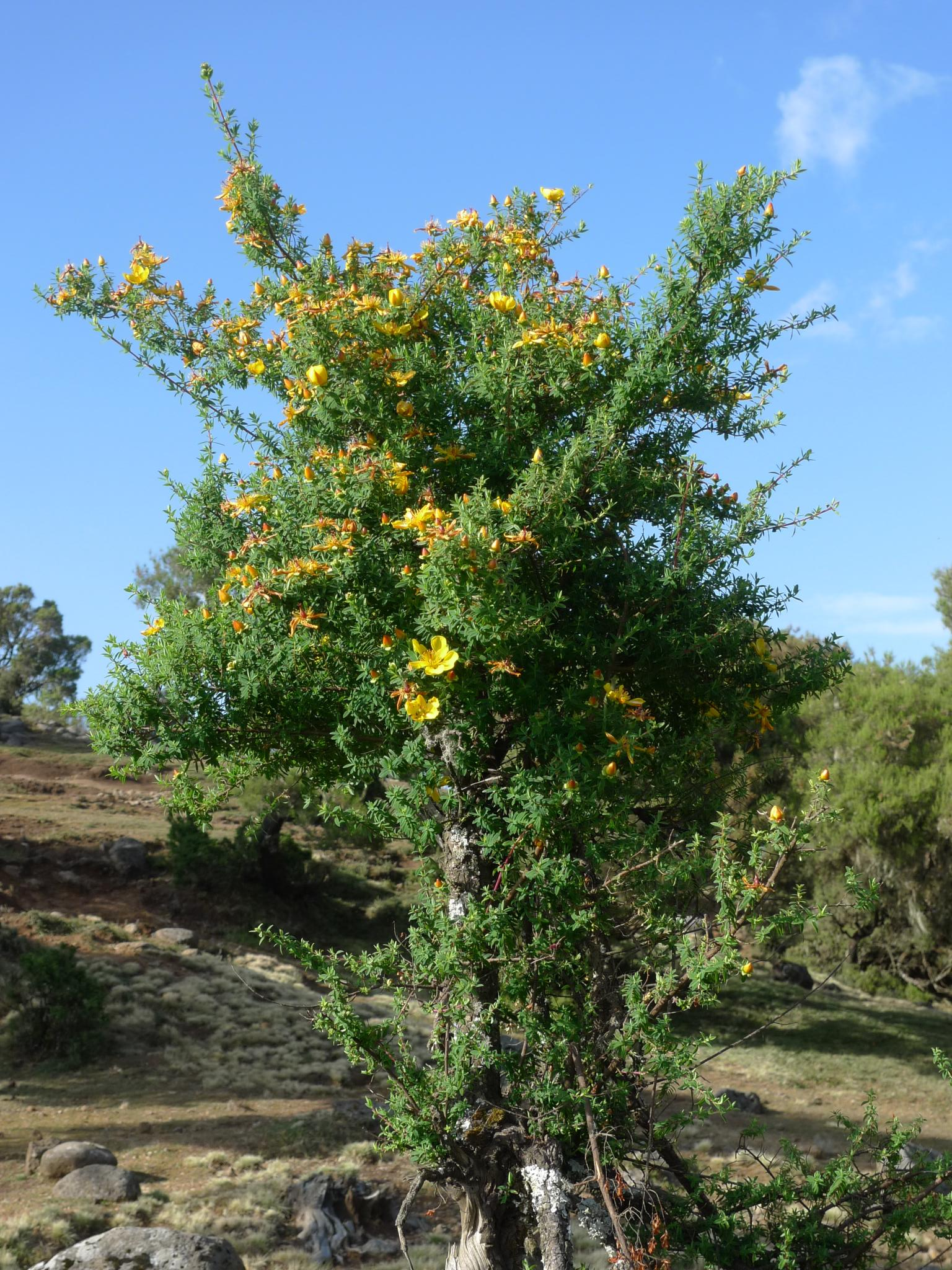
- Hypericum revolutum in the Semien Mountains of Ethiopia, at about 3300m elevation.

Scientific classification
- Kingdom: Plantae
- Clade: Tracheophytes
- Clade: Angiosperms
- Clade: Eudicots
- Clade: Rosids
- Order: Malpighiales
- Family: Hypericaceae
- Genus: Hypericum
- Section: Hypericum sect. Camplyosporus
- Species: H. revolutum

Binomial name
- Hypericum revolutum Vahl

= Hypericum revolutum =

Species of flowering plant

Hypericum revolutum is a shrub or small tree in the genus Hypericum native to Arabia and Africa. It is evergreen, with leaves opposite, closely spaced and crowded at the ends of branches, c. 20 × 5 mm, green to slightly glaucous, sessile, clasping at the base. Single bright yellow flowers form at the ends of branches, up to 5 cm in diameter, blooming from June to November. Fruit is a reddish-brown capsule, up to 13 × 10 mm.

Hypericum revolutum is characteristic of the Afromontane vegetation, found from 1400 – 2593 meters elevation, and ranging from southwest Arabia through the Afromontane zones of eastern Africa to the Cape; it is also found in the Cameroon Highlands and Bioko, and on Madagascar, the Comoro Islands, and Réunion. It grows along streams in montane grassland and forest fringes.
