= Monji anchar =

Traditional pickle of Kashmir

Monji Anchar
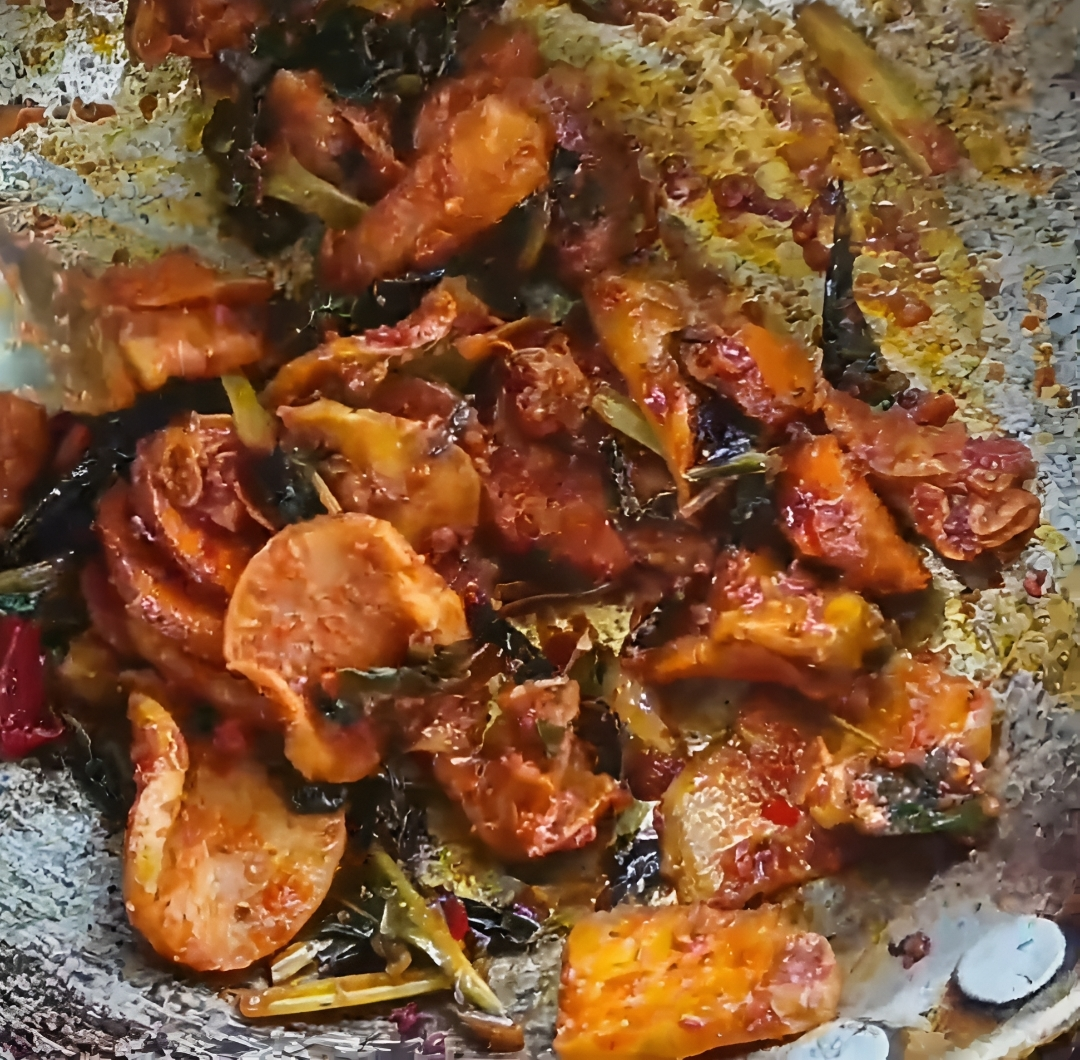
- Traditional kohlrabi pickle of Kashmir
- Place of origin: Kashmir
- Serving temperature: Cold
- Main ingredients: Kohlrabi, spices

Monji anchar (Kashmiri pronunciation: [mɔnd͡ʒi ãːt͡ʃaːr]), is an aromatic kohlrabi pickle in Kashmiri cuisine.

The pickle is traditional among both Muslims and Kashmiri Pandit households, but the ingredients and techniques vary, with Muslim versions typically including garlic, green chili, smoked mustard oil, and vinegar while Pandit versions typically use unsmoked mustard oil and omit garlic and vinegar.”

The pickle is a staple of Kashmiri cuisine. It is a common accompaniment to rice. It is also traditionally served for Khech Mavas, Ramadan and Shivratri.

== Other variants ==
Other vegetables such as carrot, cauliflower, chilis, lotus stem, and turnips are also pickled, but those are not considered traditional.
