= Ituu =

One of Clan of the Oromo people

Ituu (Oromo: Ituu Carcar) is one of the clans of the Oromo people. This group lives dominantly in the present-day West Hararghe Zone. The correct term for the land of Ituus is "Chercher" or "Ona Ituu" (the Ituu Province). It is believed the extinct Harla people were incorporated into Ituu Oromo.

== History ==
Asma Giyorgis states that the Ituu established themselves in the Adal regions after the Battle of Fatagar, which took place between Abyssinia and the Adal Sultanate.

The Ituu were invaded by Menelik II From 1883 to 1885.

== Clans ==
Ituus are divided into ten clans: Baye, Wayye, Addayyo, Aroji, Babo, Gadula, Wachale, Alga, Gamo, Elellee. There is no Galan in Ituu.

== Religion ==
The Ituu seemed to have adhered to their traditional religion until the 18th and 19th centuries, when the westward expansion of Muslim Somalis into Hararghe initiated a broader process of Islamization. Somali-origin Warra Qallu missionaries subsequently established themselves among the Ituu in Chercher as Muslim religious leaders. Islamization was significantly reinforced by Harari influence, particularly Emir ʽAbd al-Shakur ibn Yusuf, as well as Egyptian proselytizing campaigns, and Muslim religious figures. Aw Ali was an influential Ittu Muslim saint in the nineteenth century.
