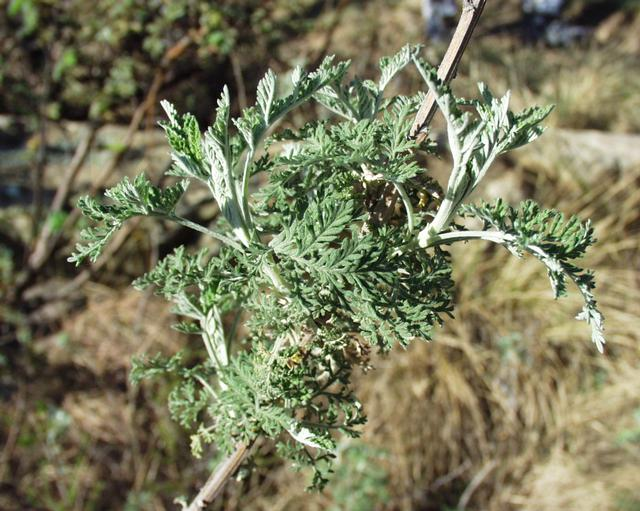
- African wormwood

Scientific classification
- Kingdom: Plantae
- Clade: Tracheophytes
- Clade: Angiosperms
- Clade: Eudicots
- Clade: Asterids
- Order: Asterales
- Family: Asteraceae
- Genus: Artemisia
- Species: A. afra

Binomial name
- Artemisia afra Jacq. ex Willd.

Synonyms
- Absinthium ponticum (L.) Garsault; Absinthium tenuifolium Gaterau; Artemisia altaica Desf.; Artemisia balsamita Willd.; Artemisia grandiflora Fisch. ex Herder; Artemisia pallida Salisb.; Artemisia pontica Burm.f.; Artemisia pseudopontica Schur; Artemisia tenuifolia Moench

= Artemisia afra =

Species of flowering plant

Artemisia afra, the African wormwood, is a common species of the genus Artemisia in Africa, with a wide distribution from South Africa to areas reaching to the North and East, as far north as Ethiopia.

== Description ==
Artemisia afra grows in clumps, with ridged, woody stems, reaching from 0.5 meters to 2 meters in height. The leaves are dark green, of soft texture, and similar in shape to fern leaves. The undersides of the leaves are a lighter green, and are covered with white bristles. Smaller side branches shoot up from the main stem. Artemisia afra blossoms in late summer, producing abundant bracts of butter-colored flowers, each approximately 3 to 5 millimeters in diameter. Artemisia afra exudes a pungent, sweet smell when any part of the plant is bruised.

== Distribution and habitat ==
Artemisia afra grows across a wide geographic area, including Kenya, Tanzania, Uganda, Ethiopia, Zimbabwe and Namibia. It grows primarily in areas that are damp, such as by the side of streams, and also in transitional areas between ecosystems. It grows at the elevations of between 20 and 2440. It can be found on slopes, stream-sides, and forest margins. It is most commonly found in the months of March, April and May. 88.4% of the time it was found, it was preserved. 48.0% of the time it was found, it was found in South Africa, 14.4% it was found in Tanzania, and 9.6% of the time, it was found in Kenya.

It is considered an invasive species, encroaching and spreading pretty fast in the nature park the study took place in. It was found in around 15% of the reserve. 71% of the plants were adults and 29% were juveniles.

== Uses ==
It has been used for many things. It has been used as a blood purifier, used to make bitter tea, and to treat every disease under the sun. People would put fresh leaves into nostrils to clear blocked nasal passages. Hot leaves were bound over sprains. It has been ground into a powder to deter ants. Moths, insects, and fleas probably don't like it too, as it has been used as a repellent. It has been used to treat malaria, which lacks scientific evidence, and the study found no interesting compounds, including artemisinin, which is used to treat malaria. The leaves have been put in socks to help treat sweaty feet.

It has been used as an infusion, a quarter cup of fresh A. afra leaves are put in a cup of boiling water, and the infusion is allowed to cool for 10 minutes. After that, it is strained and mixed with honey. A sesquiterpene lactone from afra had cytotoxicity. It has a lot of genetic variation, especially when it comes to chemical variation.

== Essential oil ==
Essential oil extracts of Artemisia afra are prepared by steam distillation using twigs and blossoms. Extracts contain the following components (via gas chromatography) which are typical of extracts of the genus Artemisia:

- α-thujone 52.9%
- β-thujone 15.07%
- 1,8 cineole 10.66%
- camphor 5.72%
- germacrene 1.60%
- δ-cadinene 1.16%
- α-terpineol 0.96%
- e-chrysanthenyl acetate 0.78%
- camphene 0.71%
- β-pinene 0.51%
- α-pinene 0.46%
- trans-β-ocimene 0.45%
- myrcene 0.22%

== Other names ==
Aretemisia afra is known by a variety of names, primarily due to the number of native dialects in regions where it grows. Langana represents a Sotho-derived name for Artemisia afra. Other variants include:

- wild wormwood (English)
- African wormwood (English)
- wilde-als (Afrikaans)
- umhlonyane (Xhosa)
- mhlonyane (Zulu)
- lengana (Tswana)
- lengana (Southern Sotho)
- nyumba (Luo)
- ariti (Amharic)
- chii (Tchad)
