= Galetti River =

River in Ethiopia

Location
- Country: Ethiopia
- Region: Oromia
- Zones: West Hararghe, East Hararghe

Physical characteristics
- Source: Ethiopian Highlands
  - location: Near Dader
  - coordinates: 9°20′40″N 41°25′41″E
  - elevation: 2,725 m (8,940 ft)
- Mouth: Ramis River
  - coordinates: 8°30′43″N 41°16′48″E
  - elevation: 855 m (2,805 ft)
- Length: 129 km (80 mi)
- Basin size: 3,589 km^{2} (1,386 sq mi)
- Discharge
  - location: Mouth
  - average: 6.67 m^{3}/s (236 cu ft/s)
  - minimum: 0.972 m^{3}/s (34.3 cu ft/s)
  - maximum: 27.9 m^{3}/s (990 cu ft/s)

Basin features
- Progression: Ramis → Shebelle → Jubba → Somali Sea
- River system: Jubba Basin
- Population: 814,000

Galetti River is a river in eastern Ethiopia. It is a tributary of the Ramis River, which is in turn a tributary of the 2,714 km (1,686 mi) long Shebelle River.
