= Chiro (town) =

Capital of West Hararghe in Oromia Regional State, Ethiopia

Asebe Teferi Ciroo (Oromo) አሰበ ተፈሪ
- Town
- Location within Ethiopia Asebe Teferi (Africa)
- Coordinates: 9°5′N 40°52′E
- Country: Ethiopia
- Region: Oromia
- Zone: West Hararghe
- Established: 1924
- Elevation: 1,826 m (5,991 ft)

Population (2014)
  - Total: 56,900
- Time zone: UTC+3 (EAT)
- Climate: Aw

Chiro (also called Asebe Teferi or Asba Littoria; Afaan Oromo: Ciroo) is a town and Aanaa in eastern Ethiopia. Located in the West Hararghe Zone in Oromia Regional State, Ethiopia Ahmar Mountains, it has a latitude and longitude of 9°05′N 40°52′E and an altitude of 1826 meters above sea level. It is the administrative center of the West Hararghe Zone in Oromia Regional State.

Nega Mezlekia described the town when he came to live there in 1977 as "a melancholic small town whose drab conditions are accentuated by the black roads, laid with crushed basaltic rocks" which "snakes along the edge of the main highway that links the city of Harar with the capital city". He describes the buildings in the town as unkept and rundown: "Generations of neglect were written into the faces of these derelict buildings. The walls had shed their meagre mud linings, and a few of the buildings tilted to one side or another, making it as dangerous a proposition to stand in their scant shade as to live in them." His opinion of the inhabitants is equally unkind, detailing how at night the marketplace was transformed into a stage where drunken peasants perpetuated blood feuds generations old. "Peasants didn't go to police or courts for justice. Blood called for blood."

== History ==
Chiro was founded around 1924 by Fitawrari Tekle Hawariat Tekle Mariyam in a picturesque woody depression at the upper part of the Chiro valley. It was the capital of the former "model" province of Chercher, created as part of Emperor Haile Selassie's campaign of modernization in the 1930s. The receveur of the post office was Dejene Habte Wolde around 1931.

During the 1950s, the coffee plantations around the town were small yet yielded a relatively high production. In 1958, Chiro was one of 27 places in Ethiopia officially ranked as First Class Township. The Ethiopian News Agency reported in mid-July 1976 that negotiations held at Chiro by representatives of hostile groups of the Afars and Issas had led to a peace agreement.

When Nega Mezlekia visited the town in 1977, he learned that the Ethiopian People's Revolutionary Party and Oromo Liberation Front were more active around Chiro than in the rest of the province. "There was a strong peasant base around the town that provided a great deal of support for the party. The forest cover in the areas nearby furnished hideout." However, when he returned the next year, he found the town far more peaceful. "It seemed that most of the threatening political opponents of the regime were dead, in exile or rotting in prison, and the going was good for those in power."

== Demographics ==
The Oromo make up the largest ethnic group in the town. The Ittuu subclan of the Oromo make up a significant portion of the town and region's inhabitants. The 1994 national census reported this town had a total population of 18,678 of whom 9,218 were males and 9,460 were females.
