= West Hararghe Zone =

Zone in Oromia State of Ethiopia

Coordinates: 8°40′N 40°30′E

West Hararghe Harargee Dhihaa (Oromo)
- Zone
- Interactive map of West Hararghe
- Country: Ethiopia
- Region: Oromia
- Capital: Chiro

Map of the regions and zones of Ethiopia

West Hararge (Oromo: Hararghe Dhiha) is a zone in the Oromia Region of Ethiopia. West Hararghe takes its name from the former province of Hararghe. West Harerge is bordered on the south by the Shebelle River which separates it from Bale, on the southwest by Arsi, on the northwest by the Afar Region, on the north by the Somali Region and on the east by East Hararghe. Towns in West Hararghe include Chiro, Badessa, Gelemso, Mieso, and Asebot.

The highest point in this Zone is Mount Arba Gugu (3574 meters).

The Central Statistical Agency (CSA) reported that 8,364.00 tons of coffee were produced in West Hararghe in the year ending in 2005, based on inspection records from the Ethiopian Coffee and Tea authority. This represents 7.27% of the Region's output and 3.7% of Ethiopia's total output.

== Demographics ==
Based on the 2007 Census conducted by the CSA, this Zone has a total population of 1,871,895, an increase of 47.16% over the 1994 census, of whom 958,861 are men and 912,845 women; with an area of 15,065.86 square kilometers, West Hararghe has a population density of 124.23. While 160,895 or 9.36% are urban inhabitants, a further 10,567 or 0.56% are pastoralists. A total of 395,127 households were counted in this Zone, which results in an average of 4.74 persons to a household, and 380,019 housing units. The three largest ethnic groups reported were the Oromo (90.12%), the Amhara (7.24%) and the Somali (1.26%); all other ethnic groups made up 1.38% of the population. oromo was spoken as a first language by 89.47%, Amharic was spoken by 8.82% and Somali by 1.2%; the remaining 0.51% spoke all other primary languages reported. The majority of the inhabitants were Muslim, with 88.05% of the population having reported they practiced that belief, while 11.11% of the population professed Ethiopian Orthodox Christianity.

The 1994 national census reported a total population for this Zone of 1,271,894 in 265,147 households, of whom 653,529 were men and 618,365 women; 95,864 or 7.54% of its population were urban dwellers at the time. (This total also includes an estimate for the inhabitants of one rural and one urban kebeles and parts of two urban ones, which were not counted; they were estimated to have 2,978 inhabitants, of whom 1,524 were men and 1,454 were women.) The four largest ethnic groups reported in West Hararghe were the Oromo (85.85%), the Amhara (11.45%), the Somali (1.17%), and the Argobba (0.81%); all other ethnic groups made up 0.72% of the population. Afan oromo was spoken as a first language by 95.35%, 3.2% Amharic, and 1.12% spoke Somali; the remaining 0.33% spoke all other primary languages reported. The majority of the inhabitants were Muslim, with 85.44% of the population having reported they practiced that belief, while 11.28% professed Ethiopian Orthodox Christianity.

According to a May 24, 2004 World Bank memorandum, 9% of the inhabitants of West Hararghe have access to electricity, this zone has a road density of 23.6 kilometers per 1000 square kilometers (compared to the national average of 30 kilometers), the average rural household has 0.5 hectare of land (compared to the national average of 1.01 hectare of land and an average of 1.14 for the Oromia Region) and the equivalent of 0.6 heads of livestock. 16.4% of the population is in non-farm related jobs, compared to the national average of 25% and a regional average of 24%. Concerning education, 55% of all eligible children are enrolled in primary school, and 8% in secondary schools. Concerning health, 92% of the zone is exposed to malaria, and none to Tsetse fly. The memorandum gave this zone a drought risk rating of 372.

The Oromia Regional government announced 25 May 2006 that 429 drinkable water projects had been completed in the Zone, which combined with other ongoing projects would bring drinkable water to 72,300 inhabitants and raise the percentage of access from 37% to 47%.
