= Ethiopian Statistical Service =

Ethiopian government agency

- የኢትዮጵያ ስታቲስቲክስ አገልግሎት

Agency overview
- Formed: 1963
- Jurisdiction: Ethiopia
- Headquarters: Addis Ababa, Ethiopia
- Annual budget: 801.7 billion birr (2024)
- Agency executive: Beker Shale, Director General
- Parent department: Ministry of Finance and Economic Development
- Website: ess.gov.et

The Ethiopian Statistical Service (ESS; Amharic: የኢትዮጵያ ስታቲስቲክስ አገልግሎት) is an Ethiopian government agency designated to provide all surveys and censuses for that country used to monitor economic and social growth, as well as to act as an official training center in that field. It is part of the Ethiopian Ministry of Finance and Economic Development. The Director General of the ESS is Beker Shale. Before 2007, the ESS was known as the Central Statistical Office (CSO). Until 2014, the agency was named the Central Statistical Agency.

The ESS has 25 branch offices. Besides the capital city of Addis Ababa, the cities and towns with offices are: Ambo, Arba Minch, Chiro, Asayita, Assosa, Awasa, Bahir Dar, Debre Berhan, Dessie, Dire Dawa, Gambela, Goba, Gondar, Harar, Hosaena, Inda Selassie, Jijiga, Jimma, Mek'ele, Mizan Teferi, Adama, Negele Borana, Nekemte, and Sodo.

National censuses of the population and housing have been taken in 1984, 1994, and 2007. Information from the 1994 and 2007 censuses are available online.

== History of statistical reporting in Ethiopia ==
While the practice of keeping statistical information in Ethiopia has been traced back as far as the sixteenth century, the need for systematic statistical information that could be used for economic management was recognized as a priority in 1957. In 1960 compiling statistical information became a regular government activity as a result of the Addis Ababa conference of the African Statisticians from UNECA member countries in 1960.

At first the collection of statistics was the responsibility of the Ministry of Commerce, Industry and Tourism, then in 1963, this activity became the function of the CSO, which was an autonomous unit under the Ministry of Planning and Development. In 1972 the CSO was reorganized in Proclamation 303/1972, and was responsible for the Planning Commission. The CSO was once again restructured on 9 March 1989, when it was renamed as the CSA and was directly responsible to the Council of Ministers. It was once again placed under a Ministry, the Ministry of Economic Development and Cooperation in October 1996, and transferred to its present position in September 2001, under the Ministry of Finance and Economic Development.

On November 21, 2006 the CSA announced that it had been recognized by the World Bank's Information Development team for being the best government agency in statistical information development in Sub-Saharan Africa.

== See also ==
- List of national and international statistical services
