= List of Oromo subgroups and clans =

The Oromo people of East Africa are divided into two major branches: the Borana Oromo and Barento Oromo. These two major groups are in turn subdivided into an assortment of clan families. From West to East and North to South, these subgroups are listed in the sections below.

== Borana Oromo subgroups ==
The Borana include:

- Borana
  - Walaabu
    - Karrayyuu
      - Macca Oromo, living between Didessa River and the Omo River, and south into the Gibe region
        - Gaaroo
        - Sirba
        - Libaan
        - Jaawwii
        - Daal'ee
      - Tulama Oromo, who live in the Oromia Region in and around Addis Ababa
        - Ada'a
          - Handha
          - Illuu
          - Dhakku
        - Daaccii
          - Oboo
            - Diigaluu
            - Eekka
            - Guulaalee
            - Gumbichuu
            - Konnoo
            - Yaayee
          - Galaan
            - Aabuu
            - Adaa
            - Gaduulaa
            - Jiddaa
            - Libaan
          - Soddo
            - Libaan
            - Odituu
            - Tummee
        - Bachoo
          - Garasuu
          - Illu
          - Keekuu
          - Uruu
          - Waajituu
          - Meta
        - Jiillee
- Ormaa
  - Dayyaa
  - Komboo
    - The Guji Oromo, who inhabit the southern part of Oromia, neighbouring the Borana Guttuu and the Sidama people.
      - Hokkuu
      - Kabalah
      - Uragaa
- The Borana Oromo, also known as Boraan Guttuu, who live in the Borena Zone.

== Barentu Oromo subgroups ==
The Barentu include:

- Karrayyu
  - Libaan
    - Wollo
      - Warra Himanoo
      - Warra Waayyuu
      - Warra Buukko
      - Warra Babbo
      - Warra Sheek Yejju
      - Warra Heebanoo
      - Rayya & Azebo
      - Warra Qaallu

  - Afran Qallo
    - Ala
      - Warra Abbaddo
      - Warra Abbayi
      - Warra Arroji
      - Warra Babbu
      - Warra Diramu
      - Warra Erer
      - Warra Galaan
      - Warra Goollo
      - Warra Gutayyu
      - Warra Kako
      - Warra Metta
      - Warra Nunu
    - Daga
      - Huumee
        - Warra Hiyyo
        - Warra Bursuuk
      - Jaarso
        - Warra Walaabu
        - Warra Sayyo
        - Warra Ogaa
        - Warra Dhanka
        - Warra Dawaro
        - Warra Oromo
    - Obborra
      - Daga
      - Bil'a
      - Dorani
      - Akkichu/Akisho
    - Noole
      - Haleele Noole
      - Mucaa Noole
        - Warra Abbayi
        - Warra Babbu
        - Warra Guyyee
      - Oromo Noole
          - Warra Bukee
          - Warra Eegu
          - Warra Jidda
          - Warra Maaru
          - Warra Naya’a
          - Warra Wacalle
      - Abuu Noole
        - Warra Garrir
        - Warra Osman
        - Warra Jarte
        - Warra Dhanqa
        - Warra Ogoo
      - Warra Mohamed
      - Mana Gatoo
      - Warra Mucha
    - Babbilee
        - Bildhi Miyye (Heebana)
          - Dhalata
        - Arreele
      - Hawwiyaa
        - Karanle
        - Xaskul
        - Raarane
        - Gugundhabe
        - Jambeele
        - Gorgaate
- Marawa
  - Ittu
    - Qallu Ittu
    - Baaye Ittu
    - Babbo Ittu
    - Arojji Ittu
    - Gadulla Ittu
    - Gaamo Ittu
    - Waayye Ittu
    - Galan Ittu
    - Wacaale Ittu
    - Elele Ittu
    - Addayo Ittu
    - Momajii Ittu
    - Alga Ittu
  - Warra Heela
  - Warra Akkiyaa
  - Warra Kajaammo
  - Warra Heebaana
  - Warra Asallaa
  - Arsi (Arse)
    - Mandoo Arsi
      - Warra Hawaxxu
      - Warra Kajawa
      - Warra Uta
      - Warra Waayyu
      - Warra Wanama
      - Warra Arrojjii
      - Warra Karara
      - Warra Daawwee
    - Sikko Arsi
      - Warra Bullalla
      - Warra Wacaale
      - Warra Jawwi
      - Warra Waaji
      - Warra Ilaanni
- Humbanna
  - Aniyaa
    - Saddacha
      - Warra Babbu
      - Warra Dambi
      - Warra Malka
    - Kudhelle
      - Warra Aanaa
      - Warra Biddu
      - Warra Koyye
      - Warra Maccaa

Afran Qallo which refers to the 4 decedents of Qallo, who are: Oborra, Daga, Babbile and Ala.

    - Ala
      - Warra Abbaddo
      - Warra Abbayi
      - Warra Arroji
      - Warra Babbu
      - Warra Diramu
      - Warra Erer
      - Warra Galaan
      - Warra Goollo
      - Warra Gutayyu
      - Warra Kako
      - Warra Metta
      - Jille
        - Warra Olid
        - Warra Waaed
    - Daga
      - Huumee
        - Warra Hiyyo
        - Warra Bursuuk
      - Jaarso
        - Warra Walaabu
        - Warra Sayyo
        - Warra Ogaa
        - Warra Dhanka
        - Warra Dawaro
        - Warra Oromo
    - Obborra
      - Daga
      - Bil'a
      - Dorani
      - Akkichu/Akisho
    - Noole
      - Haleele Noole
      - Mucaa Noole
        - Warra Abbayi
        - Warra Babbu
        - Warra Guyyee
      - Oromo Noole
          - Warra Bukee
          - Warra Eegu
          - Warra Jidda
          - Warra Maaru
          - Warra Naya’a
          - Warra Wacalle
      - Abuu Noole
        - Warra Garrir
        - Warra Jarte
        - Warra Dhanqa
        - Warra Ogoo
      - Warra Mohamed
    - Babbilee
      - Hawwiyaa
          - Karanle
          - Haskul
          - Raranne
          - Gugundhabe
          - Gambelle
          - Gorgate
      - Heeban
      - Giri

== Additional subdivisions ==
There are additional subdivisions:

- The Qallu, who live between the Awash River and Dire Dawa
- The Gabra people, who live in north Kenya along the Moyale border region
- The Sherifa, who live between the Awash River, Dire Dawa, West Hararghe Zone, Gelemso and East Hararghe Zone Deder Babile, Gursum and Harar.
