= Barento =

Subgroup of Oromo people

Regions with significant populations
- Ethiopia

Languages
- Oromo

Religion
- Islam

Related ethnic groups
- Borana Oromo

Barento (Oromo: Bareentoo) is one of the two major subgroups of the Oromo people, a Cushitic ethnic group. They live in the West Hararghe Zone, Arsi zone, of the Oromia Region of Ethiopia while the other subgroup named Borana Oromo inhabiting Oromia Special Zone Surrounding Addis Ababa, West Shewa Zone, West Welega Zone and Borena Zone of the Oromia Region of Ethiopia.

== Demography ==
Barento are one of the two main moiety of the Oromo people in the Oromia Region of Ethiopia. Between the fifth and eighth centuries, the Borana Oromo and Barentu Oromo people had differentiated from the confederation. The Barento people thereafter expanded to the eastern regions now called Hararghe, Arsi, Wello, and northeastern Shawa. The Borana people, empowered by their Gadda political and military organization expanded in the other directions, regions now called western Shewa, Welega, Illubabor, Kaffa, Gamu Goffa, Sidamo and in the 16th-century into what is now northern Kenya regions. The Borana and Barento groups are sometimes referred to as two early era moieties of the Oromo people.

== Religion ==
Many of the Barento Oromo people in Arsi, Bale and Hararghe regions abandoned their traditional religions in the 9th century, when they converted to Islam. In eastern regions close to Somalia, about 98.5% of the Barento people now follow Islam.

Some Barento Oromo away from Somalia border, in the Arsi Zone and the Bale Zone follow Orthodox Christianity.

== Subgroups ==
According to Barento there are two groups of Barento clans, the authentic Oromo and assimilated foreigners. The clans labelled Humbana are originally Oromo whereas the Sarri Sidama are non Oromo in origin and consist of various assimilated group including Harari, Somali etc. The Barento consist of the following sections or subgroups, which in turn include many subdivisions:

- The Ittu Oromo, who live in the Oromia Region from the Awash River east to a drawn south of Dire Dawa;
- The Karrayyu, who live along the Awash valley in East Shawa as well as West Hararge
- The Aniya Oromo, who live south of the Ittu and west of the Erer River; The Anniya are bordered by the Afran Qallo in the north, the Ittu in the west, the Arsi Oromo in the south and the Somalis in the east. The Anniya are divided into two major groups: Kodelle Anniya and Sadacha Anniya.
  - The Kodelle section, in turn, is divided into Bidu, Anna, Kooyyee and Macca, while the Sadacha section is divided into Molkootu, Baabbo and Bambi.
- The Afran Qallo which refer to the 4 decedents of Qallo, which are:
  - Ala Oromo, living west of the city of Harar and the Erer River
  - Oborra Oromo, living between the Ittu and Ala Oromo
  - Babille Oromo, living east of the Erer River in the Oromia Region
  - Dagaa Oromo (Huumee, Nole and Jarso):
    - (Huumee - Mana Hiyyoo) who live between Laaftoo and Faafam rivers
    - Nole Oromo who live east of Dire Dawa and north of Harar;
    - Jarso who live in the northeastern corner of the Oromia Region;
- The Arsi Oromo, who primarily live in the Arsi Zone of the Oromia Region as well as the Bale Zone; and
- The Qallu the one of Ittu tribe, who live between the Awash River Dire Dawa. And Hararghe.
- The Sherifa, or Ashraf, who live between the Awash River and Dire Dawa East Hararge Babile Deder Gursum and West Hararge Gelemso
