= Kundudo =

Mountain in Ethiopia

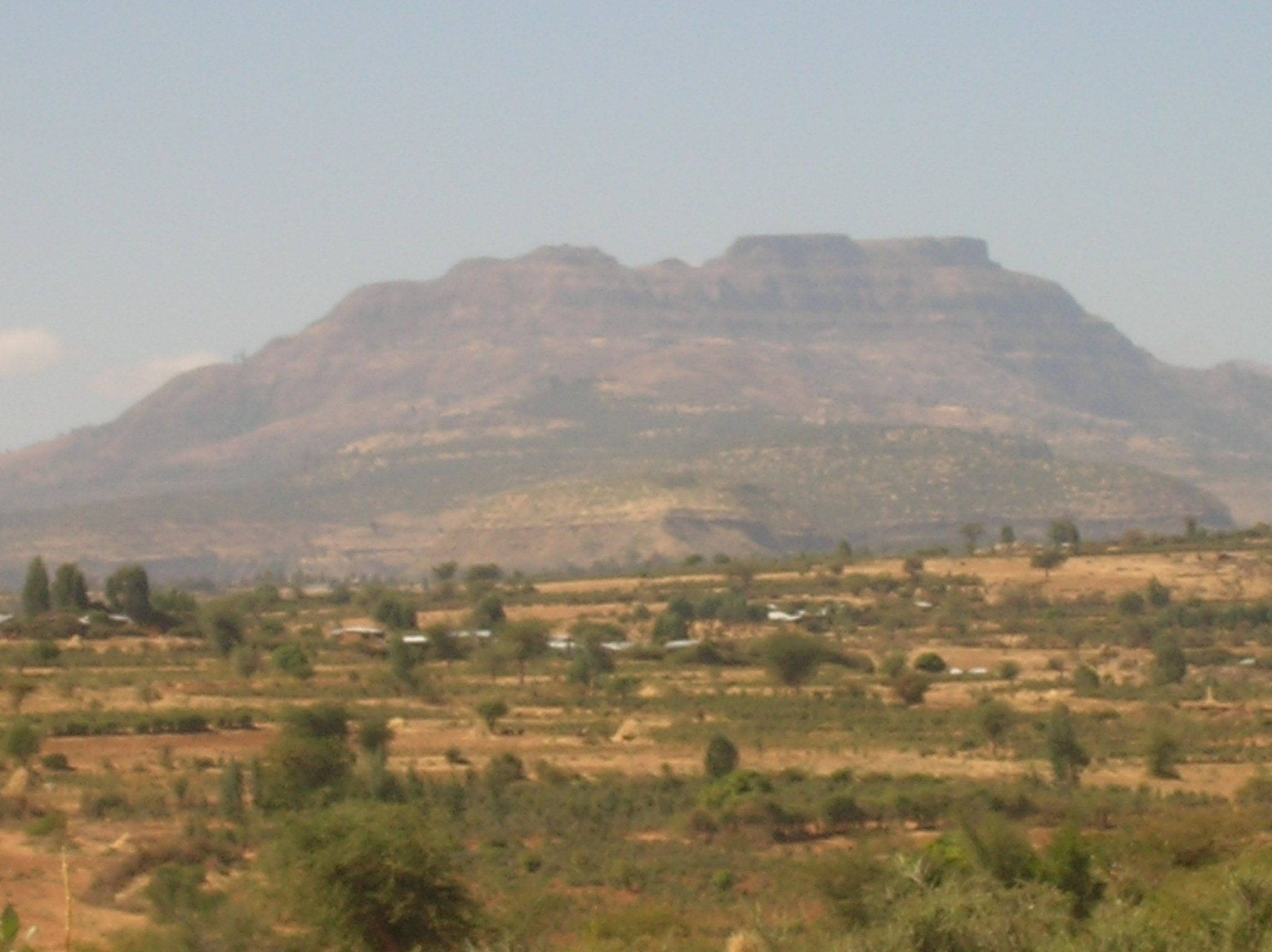

Highest point
- Elevation: 2,965 m (9,728 ft)
- Coordinates: 9°26′N 42°20′E

Geography
- Location within Ethiopia
- Location: Jarso and Gursum districts, Misraq Hararghe Zone, Oromia Region, Ethiopia

Kundudo (also spelt as Kondudo or Qundudo) is a flat-top mountain (or amba) in the Misraq Hararghe Zone of the Oromia region of Ethiopia. Part of the 13-kilometre (8 mi) range that bears its name, its summit lies east of the walled city of Harar, with a height of nearly 3,000 metres (9,800 ft).

In the same range, the Goba mountain holds a vast cave known since the 1900s, whilst at the southern end the Stinico mountain holds ancient engravings, unknown until 2008, in two recently studied small open caves. The summit is a flat grassland 13 hectares (32 acres) in area, and is the habitat of the only remaining feral horse population of East Africa, one of only two on the continent.

Below Kondudo lie the localities of Fugnan Bira (also named Gursum), Day Feres, Fugnan Hujuba, Ejersa Goro, Bedada, Goba, Sakhare and Yaya Guda. Nearby is also a shrine and a singular design mosque named by the locals after Sheikh Adem Goba.

== Human history ==
This mountain was mentioned by the British explorer Richard F. Burton, whose party travelled along its Southern base in January 1854, on their way to Harar.

On February 13–14, 2009, a group of six Italian and French speleologists explored a newly found cave of international interest. The cave is classified amongst the best five on the continent and is the only one in Ethiopia to contain a full variety of active speleothem kinds, or significant cave rock formations. The Kundudo limestone layers have been indicated by Prof. Viganó to contain more similar caves and vast fossil fields. As a consequence of these discoveries, the whole area is being proposed for the constitution of an Oromia State Park.

== Kundudo Feral horses ==
The feral horse herd is less than 50 strong and is threatened by extinction. Four local peasants in Bedada and Goba have been trying to tame them and have sold the docile colts; livestock is now grazing the top of the amba. The ruins of an ancient undated mosque on the amba has been transformed into a cattle pen.

Emperor Haile Selassie I obtained his first mount from the Kundudo pack 107 years ago. This makes them the oldest known feral horse population in Africa.

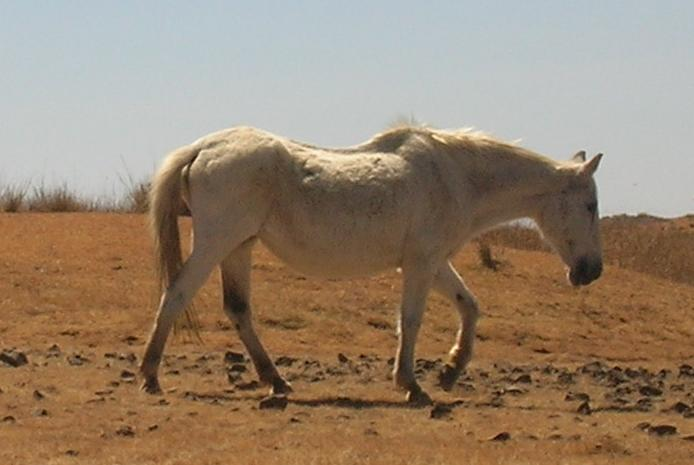
Feral horse

The herd has been the focus since 2008 of six Italian and Italo-British ecologic missions to try and save it and offer locals economic alternatives to the peculiar area's destruction. Prof. Viganò, the mission's head, has been given a charge to attempt a rapid intervention from the Ethiopian Environment Protection Agency, later by the Oromia Tourism Commissioner. The Addis Ababa office of the UNEP is monitoring his attempt.

A second mission in March 2008 revealed the whereabouts of the captive horses and found rock paintings in a cave in the mountain complex, giving rise to hopes of future tourism development in the area.

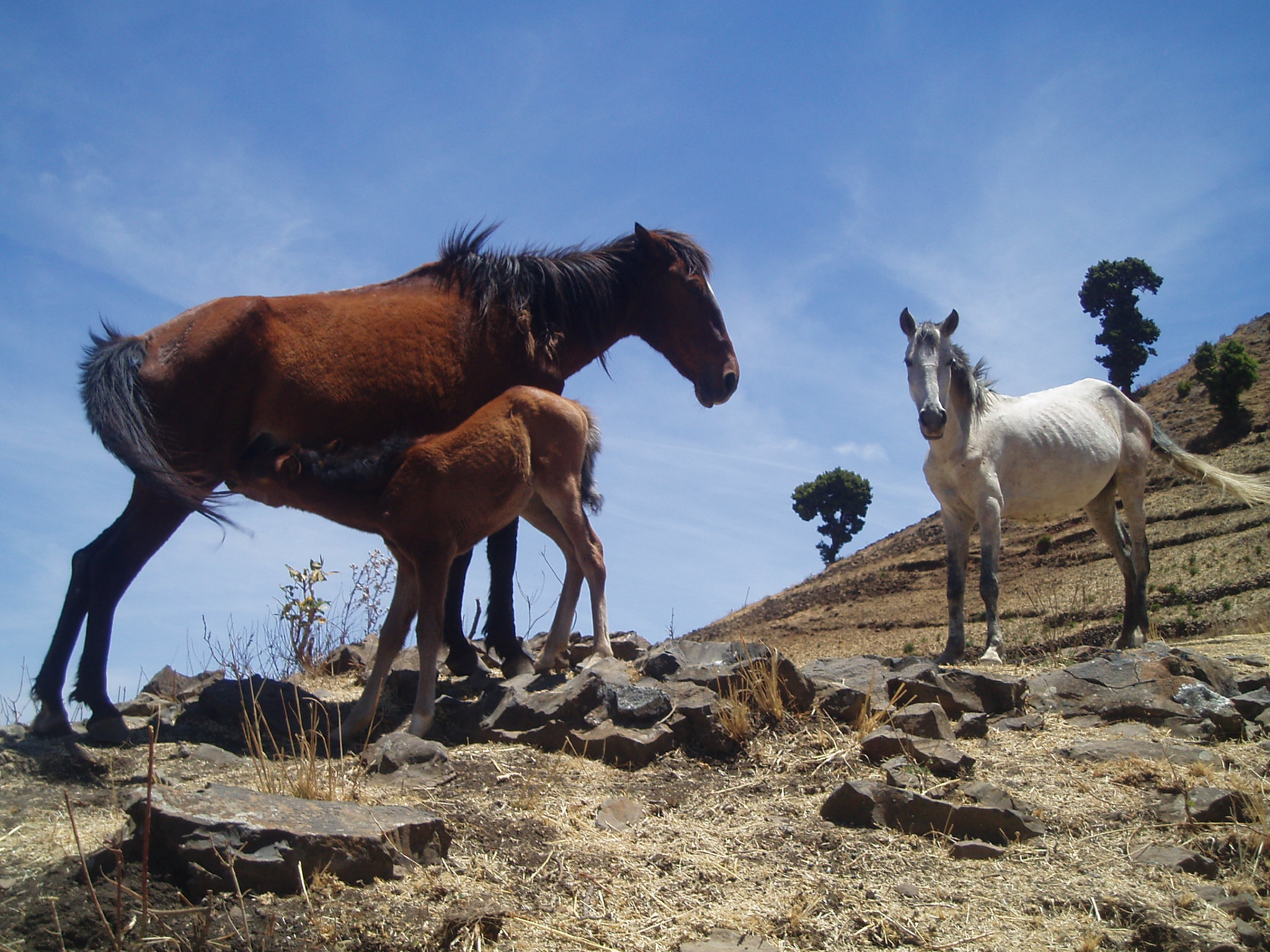
Two mares and a colt

Seven horses were reported as then freed and presently on the amba's top by the Addis Ababa-based GAG, a local interest group for the preservation of the Kundudo range and promote the Gursum area.

A major Italian aid organization is preparing a medium size aid program that stems from the research. A series of related activities are being created to save the herd and promote the area as the end point of a tourist route named "the Extended East Route" to include Harar, the Awash National Park, the Kuni-Muktar Mountain Nyala Sanctuary and some other destinations of cultural, nature and historic interest in the East of Ethiopia, forming a destination cluster with Harar itself, including Koremi village, the Babille Elephant Sanctuary (or Harar Wildlife Sanctuary) and the nearby Dhakata valley, a number of rock painting locations between Harar and the Kundudo itself.

== Gallery ==
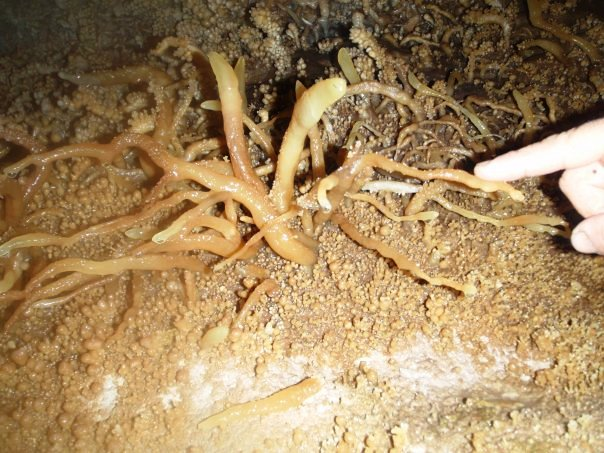
Rare eccentrics in the Kundudo newly fond cave

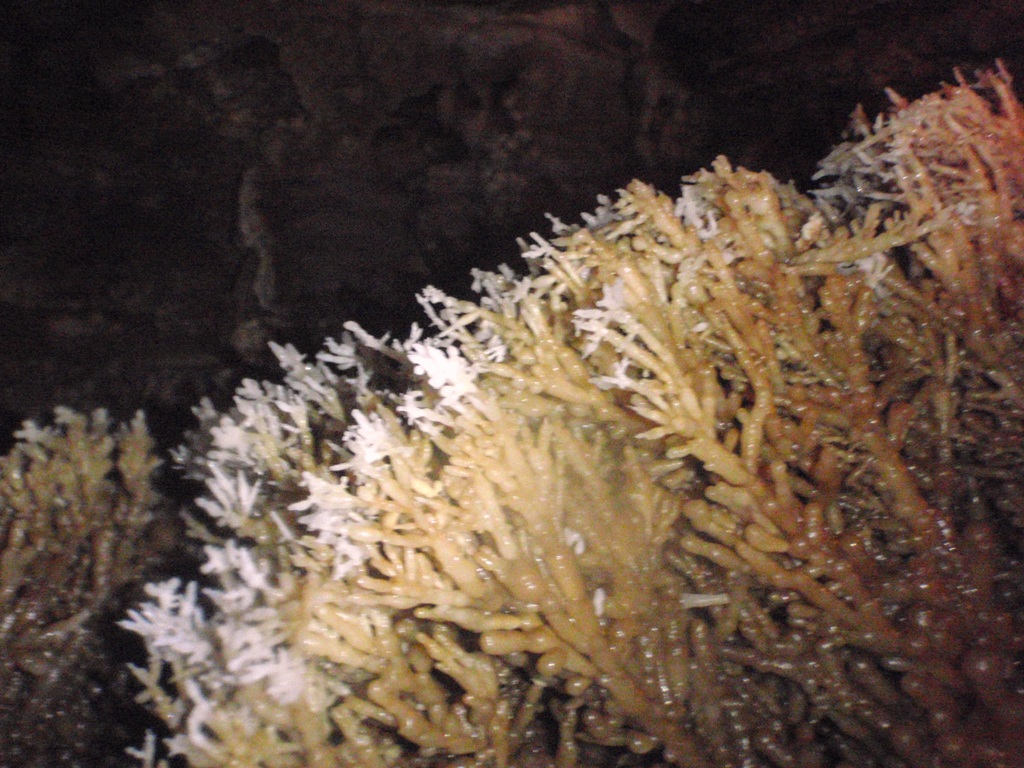
Coral-like rock formations

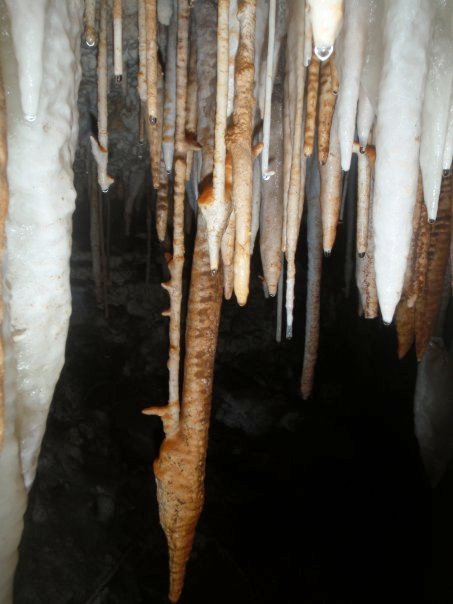
Multi-coloured formations

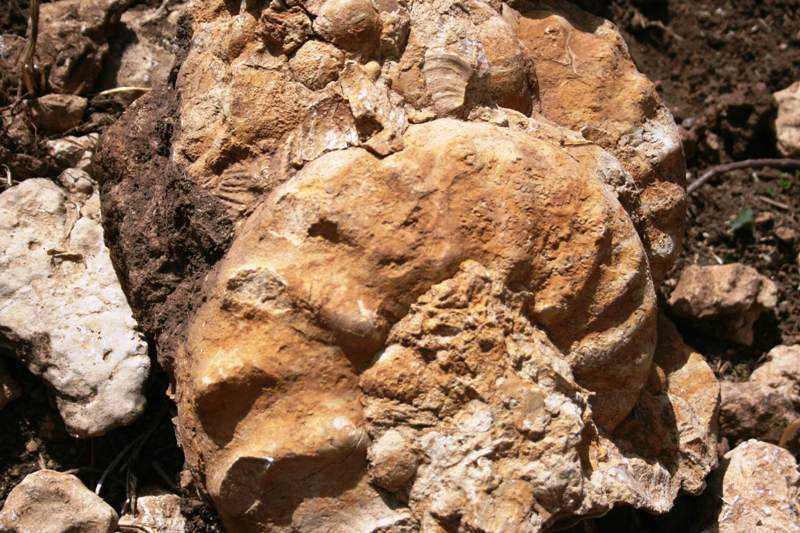
40 cm diameter ammonite on a Kundudo fossil field

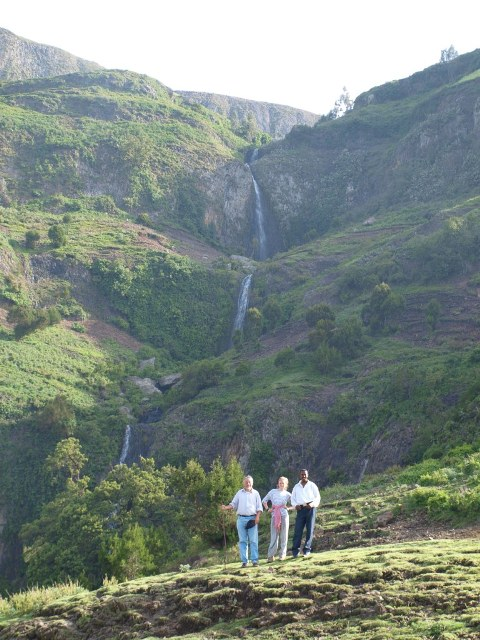
Immis, a four jump, 250m total height waterfall off the Kundudo North Face

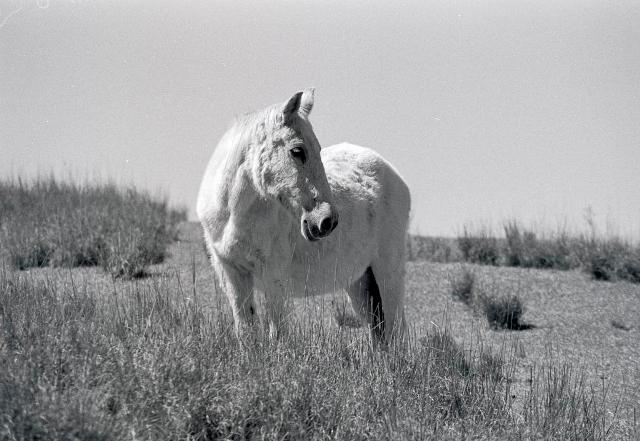
A feral horse

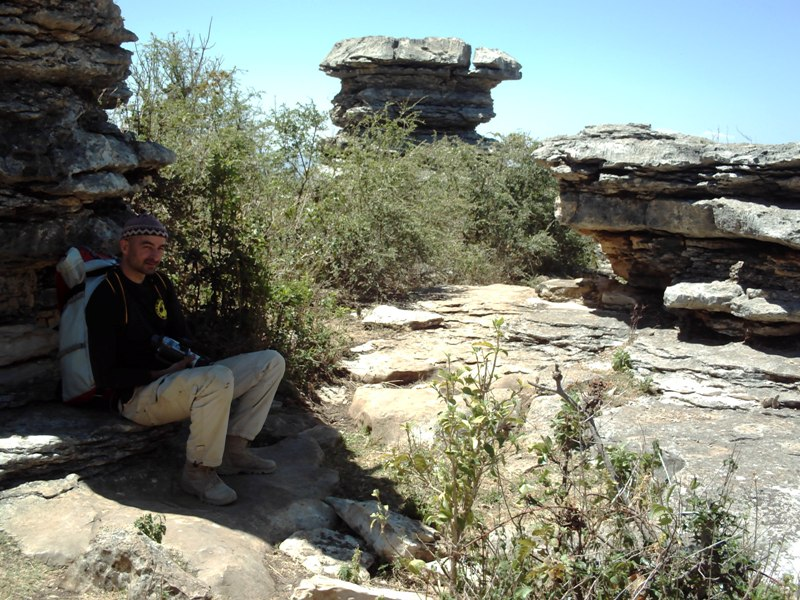
Karren, or eroded rocks, a symptom of significant caves

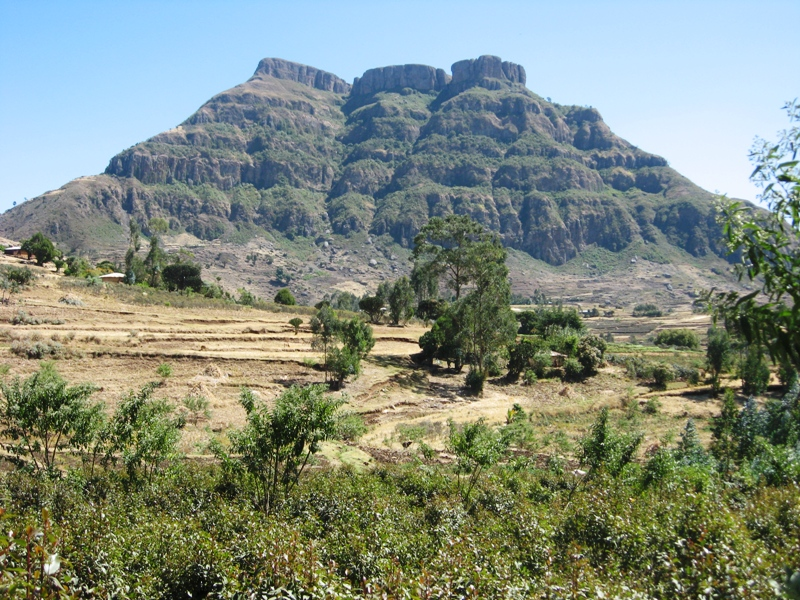
The North Face
