= Abadir Umar ar-Rida =

13th-century legendary Muslim saint

Abadir Umar Al-Rida
- الفقيه عمر الرضا (أبادر)
- Born: Hijaz, Arabia
- Died: Harar

Sheikh Abadir Umar Al-Rida (Harari: አባዲር ዑመር አል-ሪዳ ፈቂ ዑመር, Arabic: الفقيه ابادر عمر الرضا), also known as Aw Abadir or Aw Badir was the legendary founder of Harar and a patron saint in modern-day eastern Ethiopia. He is also regarded as the common ancestor of the Somali Sheekhaal clan and the Harari people.

== History ==
Aw Abadir is the main figure in the Fath Madinat Al Harar, an unpublished history of Harar in the 13th century. According to the account, he along with several other religious leaders traveled to Harar from the Hijaz region of present-day Saudi Arabia in 612H (1216 AD). Sheikh Umar Al-Rida subsequently married a local Harari woman, and constructed the city's Jamia mosque.

== In modern culture ==
As stated by the early 1800s author Yahya Nasrallah, who wrote "Fath Madinat Harar", a semi-legendary account of Harar, Abadir foretold the subjugation of Ethiopia by Italy. This prophecy would materialize a century later during the Second Italo-Ethiopian War.

== Places ==
- Aw Abadir Stadium, proposed stadium in Harar city
- Abadir mosque, largest mosque in Addis Ababa, Ethiopia

== See also ==
- Emirate of Harar
- Siddiqis in the Horn of Africa
- Wardiq
- Geledi
- qallu
- silt'e (disambiguation)
- halaba
- hadiya (disambiguation)
- Sheekhaal
