= Jarso =

Jarso may refer to:

- Jarso (Hararge), a woreda in the Oromia Region of Ethiopia
- Jarso (Welega), a woreda in the Oromia Region of Ethiopia
- Jarso (clan), a branch of the Dir Somali clan
