= Kombolcha (disambiguation) =

Kombolcha is the name of several communities and woredas in Ethiopia:

- Kombolcha, a town in the Amhara Region, which is also organized as a woreda
- Guduru, a town in the Horo Guduru Welega Zone of the Oromia Region, also known as Kombosha
- Kombolcha (woreda), a woreda in the Misraq Hararghe Zone of Oromia
  - Kombolcha, or Melka Rafu, the administrative center of that woreda
