= Horyaal Democratic Front =

Paramilitary organization in Ethiopia

The Horyaal Democratic Front or Horyaal was a Gadabuursi paramilitary organization that was active in the Somali Region of Ethiopia and in present-day Somaliland. It was established by President Mohammed Siad Barre and consisted mainly of the Gadabuursi, Jaarso, and Gurgura subclans of the Dir clan family.

It was a separatist rebel group fighting in eastern Ethiopia to create an independent state. It played a major role in the Western Somali of 1977–78 assisting the invading Somali Army. Since the end of the Ethiopian Civil War, the Horyaal Democratic Front was almost totally incorporates into the Western Somali Democratic Front. The area of influence straddles the Somaliland border and incorporated the Dire Dawa, Jijiga, Jinacsani, Tuli Guled, Harar, Ejersa Goro and the Awbar zones. The Center of this rebel was the mountains between Jinacsani and Dire Dawa.
