= Haro Maya (Aanaa) =

District in Oromia Region, Ethiopia

Coordinates: 9°10′N 41°50′E

Haramaya Haroo Maayaa (Oromo)
- District
- Location within Ethiopia
- Country: Ethiopia
- Region: (Oromia Region) Oromia
- Zone: East Hararghe
- Time zone: UTC+3 (EAT)

Haramaya (Oromo: Aanaa Haroomaayaa) is one of the woreda in the East Hararghe zone, Oromia Region, Ethiopia. It is named from the Haramaya lake that found in this woreda. The word Haramaya originated from two Oromo words—Haroo and Maya. Haroo means lake and Maya means name of person, so Haramaya means the 'Lake of Maya.' Haramaya is bordered on the south by Kurfa Chele, on the west by Kersa, on the north by Dire Dawa, on the east by Kombolcha, and on the southeast by the Harari Region. The woreda has 33 rural keble and 4 administrative towns. Towns include Haramaya, Addele, Aweday and sharif kaled.

== Overview ==
The altitude of this district ranges from 1400 to 2340 meters above sea level; the highest points include Dof and Jeldo. The major river is the Amaresa; bodies of water include Lake Haro maya. A survey of the land in Haro Maya (released in 1995/96) shows that 36.1% is arable or cultivable, 2.3% pasture, 1.5% forest, and the remaining 60.1% is considered built-up, degraded or otherwise unusable. Khat, vegetables and fruits are important cash crops. Both Kombolcha and Haro Maya are major producers of vegetables for Djibouti.

An important local landmark is Haramaya University. G.W.B. Huntingford reports that two inscribed Islamic gravestones have been found near Bati which can be dated to AD 1000, and two more bear dates, one to A.H. 662 (AD 1263) and the other to A.H. 666 (AD 1267–1268). These indicate an early Muslim presence in the area.

Industry in the district includes 1 wheat flour milling machine, 34 grain mills and 2 metal works employing 100 people, as well as 2335 registered businesses including wholesalers, retailers and service providers. There were 33 Farmers Associations with 34,422 members and 5 Farmers Service Cooperatives with 331 members. Haro Maya has 35 kilometers of gravel and 83 of dry-weather road, for an average road density of 214.5 kilometers per 1000 square kilometers. About 9.2% of the rural and 17% of the urban population have access to drinking water.

== Demographics ==
The 2007 national census reported a total population for this district of 271,018, of whom 138,282 were men and 132,736 were women; 50,032 or 18.46% of its population were urban dwellers. The majority of the inhabitants said they were Muslim, with 96.66% of the population reporting they observed this belief, while 2.7% of the population practised Ethiopian Orthodox Christianity.

Based on figures published by the Central Statistical Agency in 2005, this district has an estimated total population of 236,601, of whom 116,466 are men and 120,135 are women; 33,263 or 14.06% of its population are urban dwellers, which is greater than the Zone average of 6.9%. With an estimated area of 550 square kilometers, Haro Maya has an estimated population density of 430.2 people per square kilometer, which is greater than the Zone average of 102.6.

The 1994 national census reported a total population for this district of 166,597, of whom 84,737 were men and 81,860 women; 18,582 or 11.15% of its population were urban dwellers at the time. (This total also includes an estimate for the inhabitants of one rural kebele, which was not counted; it was estimated to have 19,337 inhabitants, of whom 9,571 were men and 9,766 women.) The two largest ethnic groups reported in Haro Maya were the Oromo (96.04%), and the Amhara (3.12%); all other ethnic groups made up 0.84% of the population. Oromo was spoken as a first language by 95.82%, and 3.62% spoke Amharic; the remaining 0.56% spoke all other primary languages reported. The majority of the inhabitants were Muslim, with 95.82% of the population having reported they practiced that belief, while 3.71% of the population said they professed Ethiopian Orthodox Christianity.

== Notes ==
The name Haro Maaya is an Oromo word that combine Haroo and maaya. Haroo means in English Lake Mayaa is the name of Person in Oromia. so Haromaya is The lake of mayaa ok not alemhaya the correct word is Haromaaya.
