= Siddiqis in the Horn of Africa =

Muslim family name

Siddiqi (Arabic: صدیقی) is a Muslim family name, found in the Horn of Africa, the Middle East and South Asia. Sheikh is an additional title used occasionally by Siddiqis to signify noble Arab heritage. According to tradition, people having surname "Siddiqi" are offspring of Abu Bakr Siddique (Arabic: ابو بكر الصديق), the first Khalifa (Caliph) and an early companion and friend of the Islamic prophet, Muhammad.

== Distribution ==
People claiming Siddiqi descent can be found in Djibouti, Eritrea, Somalia, Somaliland and Ethiopia.

However, representatives in these countries are not referred to as Siddiqi, but are instead known by various local names. Siddiqis in Eastern Ethiopia are usually called Qallu. While some of them still speak Arabic, most of them speak the regional Oromo, Harari or Somali languages, tongues which, like Arabic, also belong to the Afro-Asiatic language family. In Somalia, Siddiqis are commonly known as Sheekhaal or Aw Qutub.

== Divisions ==
Notable Siddiqi families in the Horn region include:

Aw Abadiro family

Aw Umar Ziad family

Aw Umardiin family

Aw Sadiiq family

Aw Samire family

Aw Ahmed family

Aw Kurtu Dader family (in Harar, Dader and Djibouti)

Khatibaach family

Aw Ismael family

Aw Qallu-Diinii family

Aw Khabir Hassan family (in Galamso)

Aw Samirren family

Aw Khalaf/Kalaf family

Aw Barre family

Sheikhaal/Sheikhaach family

== Common ancestor ==
The Muslim cleric Sheikh Abadir Umar Ar-Rida (Abadir Umar Al-Rida ibn Muhammad ibn Shamsadin Al-Bakri Al-Siddiqi) is traditionally regarded as the common ancestor of the Siddiqi families in the Horn region. Ar-Rida is the main figure in the Fath Madinat Harar, an unpublished history of the city of Harar in the 13th century. According to the account, Ar-Rida, along with several other saints, came from the Hijaz region of present-day Saudi Arabia to Harar in 612H (1216 AD). The Sheikh is said to have then fathered six sons, whom the Siddiqis regard as their forebears.

Sheikh Ar-Rida's tomb is located inside the walled city. A few meters away, there is also a mosque that bears his name.

== Notable Siddiqis ==
Notable Siddiqis include:

- Ahmad Taqi in Ethiopia.
- Dr. Ali Sheikh Ahmed, the founder and president of Mogadishu University in Mogadishu, Somalia. He is also president of Al-Islaah, which is part of the wider Muslim Brotherhood organization based in Egypt.
- Dr Ibrahim Dusuuqi, Muslim cleric in Somalia and former member of the Transitional National Government.
- Sheikh Ahmad Qudubi, Mogadishu-based scholar and preacher.

== See also ==
- Sheekhal clan
- Siddiqui
