= Funyan Bira =

Town located in Oromia state of Ethiopia

Funyan Bira Funyaan bira (Oromo)
- Town
- Location within Ethiopia
- Coordinates: 9°24′N 42°19′E
- Country: Ethiopia
- Region: Oromia
- Zone: East Hararghe Zone
- Woreda: Gursum

Population (2005)
  - Total: 15,478
- Time zone: UTC+3 (EAT)

Funyan Bira (Oromo: Funyaan Bira) is a town in East Hararghe Zone of Oromia Region in Ethiopia, on a high plateau at the southern base of Mount Kondudo, which gives the town a climate similar to Harar. It is the administrative center of Gursum District

Fugnan Bira has a latitude and longitude of 9°21′N 42°24′E with an elevation between 1980 and 2049 meters above sea level.

== History ==
In the early 1930s, at Funyan Bira was an agency of Said Bazarah, an export-import firm founded in 1887. During a period of unrest in the area around May 1942, Funyan Bira was also pillaged and burnt. The market was sacked next year during fighting between the Jaarso and Ethiopian government troops.

== Overview ==
The town and its vicinity has suffered from deforestation over the last 30 years. The approximately 9,000 hectares of quasi pristine forest on Mount Medero were reduced to a few remnant patches over a period of just five years from 1992 to 1993. With no active intervention most of its poorer residents will face unprecedented challenges in meeting their basic requirements. The recent recovery of one of just two feral horse population in Africa on Mt. Kundudo and, possibly the publication of the findings of a set of Italian missions in the area, the last of which (published November 2008) evaluates the significance of rock paintings on Mount Stinico, the "nose" overlooking the town, and proposes tourism as a possible source of revenue in the area. The same research-action team, led by Prof. M. Viganò is proposing a series of reafforestations.

The Oromo language Funyaan Bira means near a nose, referring to the town's proximity to the last part of a mountain chain. The town has also variously been known as (or spelled) Fugnanbira, Fiambiro, Flambiro, Fiyambiro, Funyambira, Finianbira, Fugnan Hujuba, Fugnan Ugiuba, Funyan Jeba, F. Jebe, Borsom, and Funyaabirra.

== Demographics ==
Based on figures from the Central Statistical Agency in 2005, Funyan Bira has an estimated total population of 15,478 of whom 7,676 are men and 7,802 are women. The 1994 national census reported this town had a total population of 8,657 of whom 4,163 were men and 4,494 women. The town is primarily inhabited by th Jaarso clan with a minority of (Bursuuk) and Akisho. The Gadabuursi subclan of the Dir also settle in the town.
