= Tefera Derbew =

Ethiopian politician and diplomat

- ተፈራ ደርበው

Ambassador of Ethiopia to China
- Incumbent
- Assumed office 11 March 2023
- President: Sahle-Work Zewde; Taye Atske Selassie
- Prime Minister: Abiy Ahmed

Minister of Agriculture
- In office 2008 – 1 November 2016
- President: Girma Wolde-Giorgis; Mulatu Teshome
- Prime Minister: Meles Zenawi; Hailemariam Desalegn
- Succeeded by: Eyassu Abrha

Personal details
- Education: Haramaya University (M.Sc.)
- Occupation: Politician; diplomat

Tefera Derbew (Amharic: ተፈራ ደርበው) is an Ethiopian politician and diplomat who is serving as the current ambassador of Ethiopia to China since 2023. He was promoted to ambassadorship in 2022, following an election by president Sahle-Work Zewde.

In 2008, he had served as the minister of agriculture. He was previously the head of Bureau of Agriculture and Rural Development in Amhara Region.

== Education and political career ==
Tefera Derbew holds an M.Sc. in Agricultural Economics from Haramaya University. In 2008, he had served as the minister of agriculture. He was previously the head of Bureau of Agriculture and Rural Development in Amhara Region. Tefera also was a member of board in the national broadcaster EBC from 2016.

On 26 January 2022, Tefera was appointed by president Sahle-Work Zewde as ambassador. He was promoted to full ambassadorship positions on 10 March 2023, as Ambassador Extraordinary and Plenipotentiary of Ethiopia to the People's Republic of China. He then arrived to Beijing to assume his official post in the next day.
