= Kersa (Aanaa) =

District located in eastern Oromia state of Ethiopia

Coordinates: 9°15′N 41°40′E

Kersa Qarsaa (Oromo)
- District
- Location within Ethiopia
- Country: Ethiopia
- Region: (Oromia Region) Oromia
- Zone: East Hararghe
- Time zone: UTC+3 (EAT)

Kersa (Oromo: Aanaa Qarsaa) is a District of Ethiopia in the East Hararghe Zone of the Oromia region of Ethiopia. It is named after a river that flows through it, the Kersa. The district is bordered on the south by Bedeno, on the west by Meta, on the north by Dire Dawa, on the northeast by Haro Maya, and on the southeast by Kurfa Chele. The administrative center of the district is Kersa; other towns include Langey and Watar. Before modern kersa established the city mid 17 century the Arab trader exchange bartery clothes with potate and cow goat and sheep. This area is Richest uranium deposit pegmatite rock and pitblende type of uranium.but our people growth chat crop in these area there is sweet chat when chewing it's a good "mirqaana" but a great health influence in this society this mineral dangerous health problems.

== Overview ==
The altitude of this District ranges from 1400 to 3200 meters above sea level. Rivers include the Weter, Lange and Goro; other bodies of water include the seasonal Lake Adele. A survey of the land in Kersa (released in 1995–96) shows that 28.5% is arable or cultivable, 2.3% pasture, 6.2% forest, and the remaining 56.3% is considered built-up, degraded or otherwise unusable. Khat, fruits and vegetables are important cash crops. Coffee is also an important cash crop; over 50 square kilometers are planted with this crop.

Industry in the District includes 22 grain mills employing 50 people, as well as 287 registered businesses including wholesalers, retailers and service providers. There were 35 Farmers Associations with 27,837 members and 3 Farmers Service Cooperatives with an unknown number of members. Kersa has 50 kilometers of dry-weather and 37 of all-weather road, for an average road density of 187.5 kilometers per 1000 square kilometers. This includes the paved highway from Harar to Dire Dawa. About 22.1% of the urban, 6.9% of the rural and 7.7% of the total population have access to drinking water.

In 1985, during the Derg regime, villagization was forcibly imposed in this woreda, forcing people to resettle in fewer villages; for example, the 28 villages of Adele Keke kebele were concentrated into three settlements. Those who opposed the program were arrested, tied up, and beaten. One hardship this imposed was labor and material loss because new houses had to be built. With the demise of the Derg, these new villages were abandoned and the inhabitants returned to their original homes.

== Demographics ==
The 2007 national census reported a total population for this District of 170,816, of whom 86,134 were men and 84,682 were women; 11,387 or 6.67% of its population were urban dwellers. The majority of the inhabitants said they were Muslim, with 97% of the population reporting they observed this belief, while 2.8% of the population practised Ethiopian Orthodox Christianity.

Based on figures published by the Central Statistical Agency in 2005, this district has an estimated total population of 169,330, of whom 82,537 are men and 86,793 are women; 12,203 or 7.21% of its population are urban dwellers, which is about the same as the Zone average of 6.9%. With an estimated area of 463.75 square kilometers, Kersa has an estimated population density of 365.1 people per square kilometer, which is greater than the Zone average of 102.6.

The 1994 national census reported a total population for this district of 121,197, of whom 62,355 were men and 58,842 women; 6,813 or 5.62% of its population were urban dwellers at the time. The two largest ethnic groups reported in Kersa were the Oromo (96.25%), and the Amhara (3.65%); all other ethnic groups made up 0.1% of the population. Oromo was spoken as a first language by 96.35%, and 3.58% spoke Amharic; the remaining 0.07% spoke all other primary languages reported. The majority of the inhabitants were Muslim, with 96.1% of the population having reported they practiced that belief, while 3.78% of the population said they professed Ethiopian Orthodox Christianity.
