= Meta (district) =

District located in eastern Oromia state of Ethiopia

Coordinates: 9°15′N 41°25′E

Meta Meettaa (Oromo)
- District
- Location within Ethiopia
- Country: Ethiopia
- Region: (Oromia Region) Oromia
- Zone: East Hararghe
- Time zone: UTC+3 (EAT)

Meta is one of the districts in the Oromia of Ethiopia. Part of the East Hararghe Zone, Meta is bordered on the southwest by Deder, on the northwest by Goro Gutu, on the north by the Somali Region, on the northeast by Kersa, and on the southeast by Bedeno. Towns in Meta include Chelenqo and Kulubi.

== Overview ==
Coffee is an important cash crop of this woreda. Over 50 square kilometers is planted with this crop. Around 2000 a team of workers sponsored by Korean aid widened and resurfaced significant parts of the all-weather road between Dire Dawa and Kulubi.

The Battle of Chelenqo was fought in what became this District on 6 January 1887. The army of Negus Menelik of Shewa routed the army of Emir 'Abd Allah II of Harar, and afterwards the Negus occupied and annexed that city state.

== Demographics ==
The 2007 national census reported a total population for this District of 252,269, of whom 127,371 were men and 124,898 were women; 15,198 or 6.03% of its population were urban dwellers. The majority of the inhabitants said they were Muslim, with 93.2% of the population reporting they observed this belief, while 6.26% of the population practised Ethiopian Orthodox Christianity.

Based on figures published by the Central Statistical Agency in 2005, this District has an estimated total population of 240,285, of whom 117,864 are men and 122,421 are women; 12,459 or 5.19% of its population are urban dwellers, which is less than the Zone average of 6.9%. With an estimated area of 657.03 square kilometers, Meta has an estimated population density of 365.7 people per square kilometer, which is greater than the Zone average of 102.6.

The 1994 national census reported a total population for this District of 172,803, of whom 88,440 were men and 84,363 women; 6,958 or 4.03% of its population were urban dwellers at the time. The two largest ethnic groups reported in Meta were the Oromo (92.03%), and the Amhara (7.6%); all other ethnic groups made up 0.37% of the population. Oromo was spoken as a first language by 92.32%, and 7.44% spoke Amharic; the remaining 0.24% spoke all other primary languages reported. The majority of the inhabitants were Muslim, with 91.97% of the population having reported they practiced that belief, while 7.81% of the population said they professed Ethiopian Orthodox Christianity.
