= List of ambassadors of Ethiopia to China =

Coordinates: 39.909936°N 116.445985°E

Ambassador of Ethiopia to China
- Incumbent; Tefera Derbew since March 11, 2023
- Inaugural holder: Makonnen Kebret
- Formation: September 11, 1971

The Ethiopian ambassador in Beijing is the official representative of the Government in Addis Ababa to the Government of the People's Republic of China.

== List of representatives ==
Diplomatic agrément/Diplomatic accreditation	Ambassador	Observations	List of heads of government of Ethiopia	Premier of the People's Republic of China	Term end
September 11, 1971	Makonnen Kebret		Haile Selassie	Zhou Enlai	November 8, 1974
1973	Mulugeta Estephanos	Charge d'affaires	Haile Selassie	Zhou Enlai	1975
January 29, 1976	Fantaye Biftu		Mengistu Haile Mariam	Hua Guofeng	November 1981
1986	Philippos Wolde-Mariam		Mengistu Haile Mariam	Zhao Ziyang	1991
April 1992	Haile Girogis Brook		Meles Zenawi	Li Peng	
April 18, 1994	Mulatu Teshome		Meles Zenawi	Li Peng	1995
1999	Addisalem Balema Biftu	As the Ethiopian Ambassador to China, Addis Alem Balema is also the ambassador to Australia and Singapore. According to some sources, Ethiopia's former ambassador to China, Addis Alem Belema, refused to return home, where he had been assigned a new role within the Foundation for the Rehabilitation of Tigray (Effort), a consortium	Negaso Gidada	Zhu Rongji	2004
2006	Dibaba Abdetta	Charge d'affaires	Girma Wolde-Giorgis	Wen Jiabao	June 2007
June 10, 2007	Haile-Kiros Gessesse	Member of the Democratic Revolutionary Front of the Ethiopian People. Council of Representatives, former representative of the Tigrayan People's Liberation Front in Washington, London and Khartoum Dr. Haile Woldemichael, Council Member	Girma Wolde-Giorgis	Wen Jiabao	February 2011
February 15, 2011	Seyoum Mesfin	To underscore the importance of its relationship with China, Ethiopia sent its acting and acting Minister of the Ethiopian People's Revolutionary Democratic Front, Seyoum Mesfin, in early 2011 as its ambassador to Beijing.	Girma Wolde-Giorgis	Wen Jiabao	August 2017
August 2017	Berhane Gebre-Christos		Mulatu Teshome	Li Keqiang	October 2018
February 20, 2019	Teshome Toga		Sahle-Work Zewde		10 March 2023
March 11, 2023	Tefera Derbew	Promoted to full ambassadorship in 2023 following an election by the president.	Sahle-Work Zewde Taye Atske Selassie		
