= Chinaksen (Aanaa) =

District located in eastern Oromia state of Ethiopia

Chinaksen Cinaaksan (Oromo)
- District
- Country: Ethiopia
- Region: (Oromia Region) Oromia
- Zone: East Hararghe
- Time zone: UTC+3 (EAT)

Chinaksen (Oromo: Aanaa cinaaksan) is one of the districts or woredas in the East Hararghe Zone in the Oromia region of Ethiopia. The administrative center of this Aanaa is Chinaksen.

== Demographics ==
The 2007 national census reported a total population for this woreda of 87,063, of whom 44,925 were men and 42,138 were women; 12,261 or 14.08% of its population were urban dwellers. 99.9% of the inhabitants said they were Muslim, with less than 0.1% of the population practising Ethiopian Orthodox Christianity.
