= Dadar (Aanaa) =

One of the Aanaa located in eastern Oromia state of Ethiopia

Coordinates: 9°15′N 41°20′E

Dadar dadar (Oromo)
- District
- Location within Ethiopia
- Country: Ethiopia
- Region: (Oromia Region) Oromia
- Zone: East Hararghe
- Time zone: UTC+3 (EAT)

Deder (Oromo: Aanaa Dadar) is a Aanaa in Oromia, Ethiopia. It is named after the administrative center, Deder. Part of the East Hararghe Zone, Deder is bordered on the south by Malka Balo, on the west by the West Hararghe Zone, on the north by Goro Gutu, on the east by Meta, and on the southeast by Bedeno. Towns in the district include Kobo, Deder, Soqaa.

== Overview ==
The altitude of this woreda ranges from 1200 to 3140 meters above sea level; Gondela is the highest point. Rivers include the Gelan Sedi. A survey of the land in this woreda (released in 1995) shows that 32.5% is arable or cultivable, 2.6% pasture, 1.7% forest, and the remaining 63.2% is considered degraded, built-up or otherwise unusable. Khat, fruits, and vegetables are important cash crops. Coffee is also an important cash crop; over 50 square kilometers are planted with it.

Industry in the woreda includes 25 grain mills and 2 wood-working factories employing 29 people, as well as 381 registered businesses including wholesalers, retailers and service providers. Graphite, marble, copper, iron, lead and nickel deposits are known to exist, but none have been developed. There were 33 Farmers Associations with 36,073 members and 4 Farmers Service Cooperatives with 4078 members. Deder has 84 kilometers of dry-weather, 68 kilometers of asphalt-surfaced and 83 of all-weather road, for an average road density of 507.6 kilometers per 1000 square kilometers. About 16.4% of the urban and 7.4% of the rural population have access to drinking water.

== Demographics ==
The 2007 national census reported a total population for this woreda of 242,140, of whom 123,008 were men and 119,132 were women; 22,207 or 9.17% of its population were urban dwellers. The majority of the inhabitants said they were Muslim, with 93.11% of the population reporting they observed this belief, while 6.47% of the population practised Ethiopian Orthodox Christianity.

Based on figures published by the Central Statistical Agency in 2005, this woreda has an estimated total population of 252,524, of whom 123,801 are men and 128,723 are women; 25,232 or 9.99% of its population are urban dwellers, which is greater than the Zone average of 6.9%. With an estimated area of 545.32 square kilometers, Deder has an estimated population density of 463.1 people per square kilometer, which is greater than the Zone average of 102.6.

The 1994 national census reported a total population for this woreda of 179,541, of whom 91,766 were men and 87,775 women; 14,087 or 7.85% of its population were urban dwellers at the time. The two largest ethnic groups reported in Deder were the Oromo (92.12%), and the Amhara (7.43%); all other ethnic groups made up 0.45% of the population. Oromiffa was spoken as a first language by 92.59%, and 7.04% spoke Amharic; the remaining 0.37% spoke all other primary languages reported. The majority of the inhabitants were Muslim, with 91.86% of the population having reported they practiced that belief, while 7.98% of the population said they professed Ethiopian Orthodox Christianity.
