= Goro Gutu =

District of eastern Oromia, Ethiopia

Coordinates: 9°20′N 41°10′E

Gursum Gooro Guutuu (Oromo)
- District
- Location within Ethiopia
- Country: Ethiopia
- Region: (Oromia Region) Oromia
- Zone: East Hararghe Zone
- Time zone: UTC+3 (EAT)

Goro Gutu (Oromo: Aanaa Gooro Guutuu) is a Aanaa in Oromia, Ethiopia. This district is named after Mount Goro Gutu, its tallest mountain. Part of the East Hararghe Zone, Goro Gutu is bordered on the south by Deder, on the west by the West Hararghe Zone, on the north by the Somali Region, and on the east by Meta. The administrative center is Karamile; other towns include Boroda towns.

== Overview ==
The altitude of this District ranges from 1200 to 2660 meters above sea level; other notable elevations include Mount Gangilo. Rivers include the Erer, Usman Ejersa and Burka. A survey of the land in Goro Gutu (released in 1994–95) shows that 20.3% is arable or cultivable, 19.9% pasture and forest, and the remaining 59.8% is considered built-up, degraded or otherwise unusable. Khat, vegetables and fruits are important cash crops. Although coffee is also an important cash crop for this District, only between 20 and 50 square kilometers are planted with it.

Industry in the District includes 15 grain mills employing 53 people, as well as 209 registered businesses including wholesalers, retailers and service providers. There were 27 Farmers Associations with 24,115 members and no Farmers Service Cooperatives. Goro Gutu has 74 kilometers of dry-weather and 68 of all-weather road, for an average road density of 268 kilometers per 1000 square kilometers. About 18.9% of the urban, 3.7% of the rural and 4.4% of the total population have access to drinking water.

In October 2004, a referendum was held in about 420 kebeles in 12 woredas across five zones of the Somali Region to settle the boundary between Oromia and the adjacent Somali Region. According to the official results of the referendum, about 80% of the disputed areas have fallen under Oromia administration, though there were numerous allegations of voting irregularities in many of them. The results led over the following weeks to minorities in these kebeles being pressured to leave. The woreda administration send an urgent request to the NGO Catholic Relief Service for assistance with the immediate humanitarian needs of 324 refugees, which included food, shelter and clothing. These had fled from the Somali woreda of Erer due to the ethnic violence.

== Demographics ==
The 2007 national census reported a total population for this District of 143,931, of whom 73,530 were men and 70,401 were women; 10,066 or 6.99% of its population were urban dwellers. The majority of the inhabitants said they were Muslim, with 93.29% of the population reporting they observed this belief, while 5.96% of the population practised Ethiopian Orthodox Christianity.

Based on figures published by the Central Statistical Agency in 2005, this District has an estimated total population of 147,041, of whom 72,664 are men and 74,377 are women; 7,758 or 5.28% of its population are urban dwellers, which is less than the Zone average of 6.9%. With an estimated area of 536.88 square kilometers, Goro Gutu has an estimated population density of 273.9 people per square kilometer, which is greater than the Zone average of 102.6.

The 1994 national census reported a total population for this District of 105,719, of whom 53,717 were men and 52,002 women; 4,333 or 4.1% of its population were urban dwellers at the time. The two largest ethnic groups reported in Goro Gutu were the Oromo (92.55%), and the Amhara (7.2%); all other ethnic groups made up 0.25% of the population. Oromo was spoken as a first language by 92.5%, and 7.27% spoke Amharic; the remaining 0.23% spoke all other primary languages reported. The majority of the inhabitants were Muslim, with 91.8% of the population having reported they practiced that belief, while 7.79% of the population said they professed Ethiopian Orthodox Christianity.
