= Kulubi =

Town Oromia Region, Ethiopia

Kulubi Qullubbii (Oromo)
- Town
- Location within Ethiopia
- Coordinates: 9°24′54.7″N 41°41′5.55″E
- Country: Ethiopia
- Region: Oromia
- Zone: East Hararghe
- Woreda: Meta
- Climate: Cwb

Kulubi is a town located in the East Hararghe Zone of the Oromia Region, Ethiopia lying south of Dire Dawa, this town has a latitude and longitude of 9°26′N 41°41′E with an elevation of 2130 meters above sea level.

Based on figures published by the Central Statistical Agency in 2005, Kulubi has an estimated total population of 4,478 of whom 2,318 are males and 2,160 are females. The 1994 national census reported this town had a total population of 2,501 of whom 1,257 were males and 1,244 were females. It is one of two towns in Meta Aanaa.

Kulubi is known for its large church, dedicated to St. Gabriel, which was built to commemorate the victory of Menelik II warriors over Muslim mosques (i.e. Jibril Mosque that was buried three kilometers from the Church). The site serves massive twice-yearly pilgrimages (on 26 July and 28 December) attended by tens of thousands of Orthodox pilgrims. The present church was erected in 1962 by Emperor Haile Selassie, replacing one his father, Ras Makonnen, had erected to celebrate the Ethiopian victory in the Battle of Adwa. Nega Mezlekia, in his Notes from the Hyena's Belly, describes the discussion inhabitants held over dedicating a church to St. Gabriel when "there were already two churches within twenty kilometers dedicated to the same saint. ... and that prayers and pleas directed to one saint, at the same hour and from two separate locations, had ended in disaster, for the requests of the two parishes were too often mutually exclusive."
