= Derbiga =

- Type: City
- Location: Ethiopia

Site notes
- Archaeologists: Père Azaïs; Roger Chambard
- Discovered: 1931

Derbiga was a medieval Muslim city in Adal (present-day eastern Ethiopia). Located a few km northwest of Chinaksen in the Fafan zone Awbare of Somali Region.

== Semi-legendary account ==
French researcher Christian Bader recounts the fall of Derbiga according to tradition:

The ruler of the Harla of Derbiga, a certain Galab Deni, installed his daughter with the mission of watching for the arrival of enemies (likely Somalis) on the Jigjiga plain. The attackers, among whom was the lover of Galab Deni's daughter, then cut grass, from which they concealed the men and their horses; thus camouflaged, they were able to advance unseen. When Galab Deni asked his daughter if she saw anything coming, she replied, "Nothing, oh my, except that the plain seemed to advance at that moment." "Thus, the enemies, suddenly rising up, launched an assault on Derbiga and destroyed the city. Believing that his wife had betrayed him in order to spare her lover, Galab Deni had her head cut off.

== History ==
Reports specify it was the site of a large city encircled by walls, notable for its ancient mosque and the presence of Muslim burial sites. The construction employing dressed stones resembles that which is observed at other Islamic sites of Chercher and Ifat, dated between the 14th and 15th centuries.

== Discovery ==
Derbiga was discovered in 1931 by French archaeologists Père Azaïs and Roger Chambard with the assistance of the local Kabir. British researcher Richard Wilding later unearthed 14th century Chinese ceramics, suggesting that trade relations had been established between China and the eastern parts of the Horn of Africa.
