= Kurfa Chele (Aanaa) =

District located in eastern Oromia state of Ethiopia

Coordinates: 9°10′N 41°45′E

Kurfa Chele Kurfaa Callee (Oromo)
- District
- Location within Ethiopia
- Country: Ethiopia
- Region: (Oromia Region) Oromia
- Zone: East Hararghe
- Time zone: UTC+3 (EAT)

Kurfa Chele (Aanaa Kurfaa Callee), also commonly abbreviated as K.C., is a district in the Oromia Region of Ethiopia. It is named after its administrative center, Kurfa Chele. Part of the East Hararghe Zone, Kurfa Chele is bordered on the south by Girawa, on the west by Bedeno, on the northwest by Kersa, and on the northeast by Haro Maya. Towns in the woreda include Dawe.

Kurfa Chele includes of the Gara Muleta mountain chain, one of the major highland areas of eastern Oromia. Mount Debal, one of the largest and most prominent mountains in the area, is located within the woreda.

The woreda is known locally for its strong cultural identity, hospitality, and contributions to music, education, and social movements in eastern Ethiopia. Residents of Kurfa Chele are widely recognized for courteous social traditions and welcoming attitudes toward guests and visitors. The community is also associated with relatively strong urban influence, emphasis on education, and modern cultural outlook compared to many surrounding rural areas.

Kurfa Chele has produced a number of artists, intellectuals, and individuals associated with historical freedom movements in the Hararghe region. Cultural traditions, artistic expression, and education continue to play an important role in the social life of the community.

== Overview ==
The altitude of this woreda ranges from 1400 to 3400 meters above sea level; Gara Muleta, Dedero and Gebiba are amongst the highest points. Rivers include the Dawe, Gefra Gelana and Gefra. A survey of the land in Kurfa Chele (released in 1995/96) shows that 23.3% is arable or cultivable, 1.4% pasture, 14.7% forest, and the remaining 60.6% is considered built-up, degraded or otherwise unusable. Khat and vegetables are important cash crops.

Industry in the woreda includes 9 grain mills employing 29 people, as well as 68 registered businesses including wholesalers, retailers and service providers. There were 14 Farmers Associations with 8714 members and one Farmers Service Cooperatives with 627 members. Kurfa Chele has 96 kilometers of dry-weather and 55 of all-weather road, for an average road density of 581 kilometers per 1000 square kilometers, the highest in the Zone. About 23.4% rural and 4.2% of the urban population have access to drinking water; normally urban areas in Ethiopia have a larger percentage with access to drinkable water than rural areas.

== Demographics ==
The 2007 national census reported a total population for this woreda of 58,701, of whom 29,675 were men and 29,026 were women; 5,764 or 9.82% of its population were urban dwellers. The majority of the inhabitants said they were Muslim, with 96.44% of the population reporting they observed this belief, while 3.27% of the population practised Ethiopian Orthodox Christianity.

Based on figures published by the Central Statistical Agency in 2005, this woreda has an estimated total population of 54,127, of whom 26,500 were males and 27,627 were females; 4,940 or 9.13% of its population are urban dwellers, which is greater than the Zone average of 6.9%. With an estimated area of 259.69 square kilometers, Kurfa Chele has an estimated population density of 208.4 people per square kilometer, which is greater than the Zone average of 102.6.

The 1994 national census reported a total population for this woreda of 38,559, of whom 19,726 were men and 18,833 women; 2,755 or 7.14% of its population were urban dwellers at the time. (This total also includes an estimate for the inhabitants of one rural kebele, which was not counted; it was estimated to have 9,198 inhabitants, of whom 4,537 were men and 4,661 women.) The two largest ethnic groups reported in Kurfa Chele were the Oromo (94.25%), and the Amhara (5.69%); all other ethnic groups made up 0.06% of the population. Oromiffa was spoken as a first language by 94.16%, and 5.81% spoke Amharic; the remaining 0.03% spoke all other primary languages reported. The majority of the inhabitants were Muslim, with 93.42% of the population having reported they practiced that belief, while 6.45% of the population said they professed Ethiopian Orthodox Christianity.
