= Haramaya =

Town in Oromia Region, Ethiopia

Haramaya Haramayaa
- Town
- Location within Ethiopia Haramaya (Africa)
- Coordinates: 9°24′N 42°01′E
- Country: Ethiopia
- Region: Oromia Region
- Zone: East Hararghe
- Woreda: Haro Maya
- Elevation: 2,047 m (6,716 ft)

Population (2005)
  - Total: 15,317
- Time zone: UTC+3 (EAT)
- Climate: Cwb

Haramaya (Oromo: Haramayaa or Haroomaayaa) is a town in Oromia Region, Ethiopia located in the Haro Maya district, East Hararghe Zone. The town has a latitude and longitude of 9°24′N 42°01′E with an elevation of 2047 meters above sea level.

Haramaya is 10 km (6.2 mi) west of Harar, on the road to Dire Dawa. It is located on Lake Haramaya a seasonal freshwater lake which supports a population of flamingo, as well as other birds.

== Background ==
Haramaya is the home to Haramaya University, which was during the naftenya era named as Alemaya University and reverted to original native name. The university was originally established as an agricultural technical college, with assistance from Oklahoma State University. Although classes started 5 November 1956, the university was formally inaugurated by Emperor Haile Selassie 16 January 1958. By 1967 Haramaya had telephone service.

Based on figures from the Central Statistical Agency in 2005, Haramaya has an estimated total population of 15,317 of whom 7,796 are men and 7,521 are women. The 1994 national census reported this town had a total population of 8,560 of whom 4,228 were males and 4,332 were females. It is the largest of three towns in Haro Maya District.
