= Seyoum Mesfin =

Ethiopian politician and diplomat (1949–2021)

- ሰዩም መስፍን

Minister of Foreign Affairs
- In office 1991–2010
- Preceded by: Tesfaye Tadesse
- Succeeded by: Hailemariam Desalegn

Ambassador of Ethiopia to the People's Republic of China
- In office 15 February 2011 – 19 August 2017

Personal details
- Born: 25 January 1949 Adigrat, Tigray Province, Ethiopian Empire
- Died: 13 January 2021 (aged 71) Asgede Tsimbla, Tigray Region, Ethiopia
- Cause of death: Gunshot wounds by ENDF
- Party: EPRDF
- Other political affiliations: TPLF
- Education: Bahir Dar Polytechnic Institute; Addis Ababa University

Seyoum Mesfin Gebredingel (SAY-yoom MEHS-fihn; Tigrinya: ሰዩም መስፍን, pronounced [säyumə mesefənə]; 25 January 1949 – 13 January 2021) was an Ethiopian politician and diplomat. He was Ethiopia's Minister of Foreign Affairs from 1991 to 2010 and served as Ethiopia's Ambassador to China from 2011 to 2017.

== Early life and education ==
Seyoum was born on 25 January 1949 in Tigray, Ethiopia, as Ambaye Mesfin. He later changed from Ambaye to Seyoum as a nom de guerre. He attended Agazi Secondary School in Adigrat and Bahir Dar Polytechnic Institute from which he received a diploma in industrial chemistry in 1971. He studied international law at the University of Amsterdam. In May 2010, he was awarded a doctorate of letters from Great Lakes University of Kisumu in Kenya.

== Career ==
=== Political career ===
He was one of the founders of the Tigray Peoples' Liberation Front (TPLF). Seyoum served as chairman of the Foreign Affairs Committee of the Ethiopian People's Revolutionary Democratic Front (EPRDF) in the 1980s. He was a member of the Marxist–Leninist League of Tigray (MLLT) and composed songs to honor the organization. On 23 March 2013, Seyoum resigned from the TPLF Central Committee at its 11th meeting.

=== Minister of Foreign Affairs ===
Seyoum was the Ethiopian minister of foreign affairs for nearly 20 years, from 1991 until he was replaced after the 2010 parliamentary election. He was also an executive member of the Central Committee of the EPRDF. He was influential in the Eritrean Ethiopian war and on 18 June 2000, Seyoum Mesfin, and his Eritrean counterpart, Haile Woldetensae, signed a peace agreement ending the war. On 28 December 2004, Mesfin made a speech to the UN General Assembly in New York on the policy in the region, in particular the relationship of Ethiopia to Eritrea and Somalia. In 2007, Seyoum indicated that Eritrea had breached the agreements that ended its war and Ethiopia might end all or part of those agreements. He was also a member of the House of Peoples' Representatives, representing Adigrat.

=== Ambassador to China ===
After leaving the government in 2010, Seyoum was appointed Ambassador to China. He visited Singapore in December 2012 to potentially set up an Ethio-Singapore Special Economy Zone and expand cooperation in aviation.

In 2015, Seyoum was the chief mediator of South Sudan's IGAD-mediated peace talks. He urged both sides to end hostilities and form a transitional government. He launched the think tank Centre for Research, Dialogue & Cooperation (CRDC), a part of the Ministry of Education, on 12 April 2016.

Seyoum was also chief executive officer of the Endowment Fund for the Rehabilitation of Tigray from 2000 until early 2009. Seyoum served as the Chairman for ten years until 2011 and was a member of the management board of Ethiopian Airlines.

=== Advisor to the Carter Center ===
From 2018–2020, Seyoum served as the African principal for the Carter Center's initiative to further Africa-U.S.-China cooperation. He co-chaired two international track 1.5 dialogues featuring participants from the U.S., China, and various African countries in Johannesburg and Addis Ababa. Seyoum co-chaired these dialogues with the Chinese principal for the initiative, Ambassador Zhong Jianhua. Seyoum had a close working relationship with Ambassador Zhong Jianhua, who was the former PRC Ambassador to Ethiopia and the Special Representative on African Affairs to the Chinese government.

== Family and personal life ==
Seyoum was married and had four children - three sons and one daughter. As of 14 January 2021, after Seyoum had been killed by the ENDF as part of the Tigray war, Seyoum's wife and one of his sons were on bail after having been arrested, according to British African expert Alex de Waal.

== Death ==
According to the Ethiopian government, Seyoum was killed when his bodyguards and Ethiopian soldiers engaged in a shootout after he refused to surrender in the then ongoing Tigray War on 13 January 2021. Two other TPLF officials were killed with him and five further TPLF officials were captured. The TPLF claimed the veterans, including Seyoum, were summarily executed. An obituary for Seyoum Mesfin, describing him as a "peacemaker and patriot", was published by Alex de Waal. De Waal called for an "immediate high-level international investigation" into the killings of Seyoum and the two TPLF officials.
