= Jaarso =

Northern Somali clan

Jaarso جارسو
- Dir Somali Clan
- Ethnicity: (Somalia) Somali
- Location: Ethiopia
- Descended from: Djarsso
- Parent tribe: Dir
- Branches: Bah’ Midig (Senior wife) and Bah’ Bidix (Junior wife); Bidix; Dhanqo; Sayo; Ooge; Midig; Walabi; Dawaro; Ali (Oromo)
- Language: (Somalia) Somali (Ethiopia) Oromo (Arab League) Arabic
- Religion: Sunni, Sufism, Islam

The Jaarso, Giarso or Jarso (Somali: Jaarso, Oromo: Jaarsoo, Arabic: جارسو) is a major northern Somali clan, a sub-division of the Dir clan family. They largely live in Ethiopia, in the Oromo Region and the Somali Region, especially in and around the cities of Chinaksen, Harar and Jigjiga.

== Overview ==
As a Ali Madahweyn Dir sub-clan, the Jaarso have immediate lineal ties with the Gurgura, Akisho, Gadabuursi, Issa, the Biimaal, the Bursuk, the Madigan Dir, Gurre, Gariire other Dir sub-clans and they have lineal ties with the Hawiye (Irir), Hawadle, Ajuran, Degoodi, Gaalje'el clan groups, who share the same ancestor Samaale.

== Distribution ==
The Jarso Ali Madaweyn are a vast clan that stretch from Diida Waleed (near Jijiga) to the Awash region; they also extend onto the areas northwestern Fafan Zone. The Jaarso are the majority clan in Jarso (woreda), Funyan Bira and in the East Hararghe Zone.

== Code of Conduct (Xeerka Jaarso) & Administration ==
The Jarso clan faced a series of problems, including Ethnic conflict, civil wars, clan border disruptions due to massive Oromo and Somali clans migration, which caused societal chaos. In response, Jaarso established a traditional constitution called Xeer Jaarso also known as “Xeerka lixda Jaarso” (The law of the six Jaarso), characterized by power-sharing principles, uniting the community in their pursuit of stability and order.

According to oral tradition, as narrated by Jaarso elders, The Jaarso Code of Conduct is older than 1200 years and In order to establish their governance and decision-making process, the elders of Jaarso held a 12-month meeting in a small village called Marrar near Jinacsani and Mullisa mountainous village between Ejersa Gora and Adari. All the six major Jaarso sub-clans participated and every sub-clan had at least one member. The elders were chosen for their knowledge of the law and wisdom and especially their knowledge for the neighboring folks. Normally a Xeer (law) to be excepted by the people has to have Multiple chieftains or clan leaders whom in this case will serve as judges and the number of the judges were 6.

While some Ethiopian tribes and Somali clans have adopted symbols or flags for cultural or political representation, there is no documented or official flag specifically associated with the Jaarso clan except the old white and red flag of Ifat.

== History ==
The Jaarso are mainly found in Jarso (woreda), and northwestern Fafan Zone, in the East Hararghe Zone and are predominant clan in the historic towns of Jinacsani or Chinaksen, Funyaan Bira and Hubat today known as Ejersa Goro. The sixteenth-century ruler of Adal who conquered Abyssinia, Ahmad ibn Ibrahim al-Ghazi was born in Hubat.

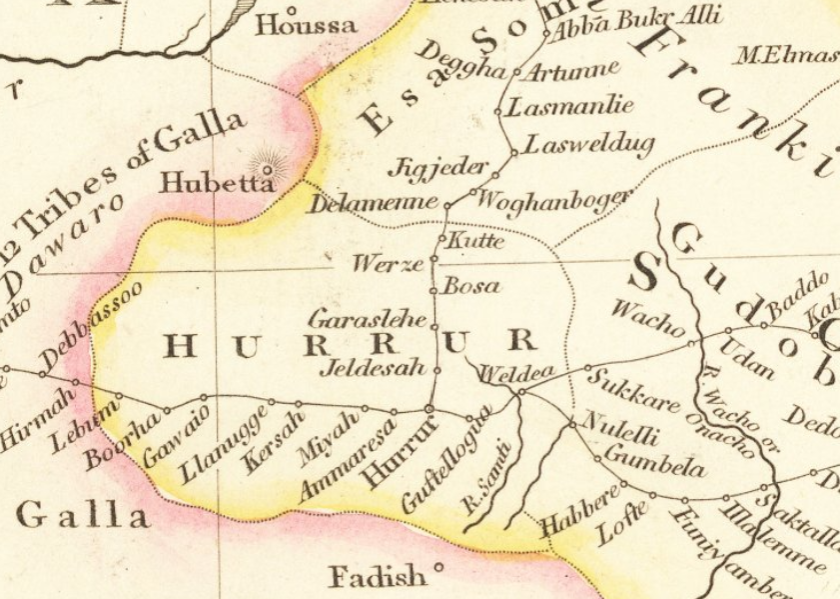
1832 map by John Arrowsmith illustrating Hubetta's location in the Emirate of Harar

Either Jinacsani or Funyan Bira is believed by archaeologist to be Dakkar, which served as the first capital of the Adal Sultanate after its founding in the early 15th century by Sabr ad-Din. Enrico Cerulli, Bahru Zewde and other historians identify Dakkar as being located one km southeast of Harar. However, Richard Pankhurst states that the city was situated near the village of Funyan Bira and G. W. B. Huntingford believes that it was in the town of Chinaksen near Jigjiga.

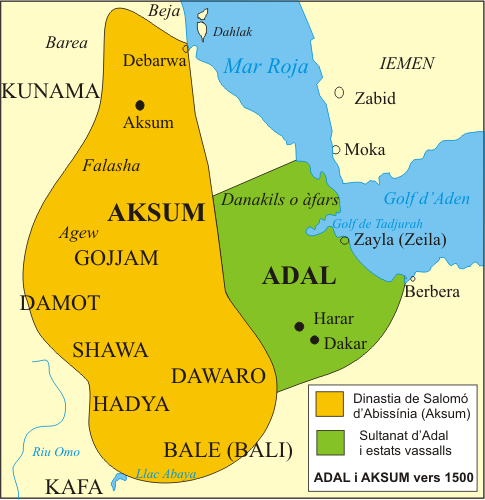
Map of Dakkar and Harar. Both served as the capitals of the Adal Sultanate

The Jaarso (as Jairan) were one of the first clans to accept the call of jihad and they are mentioned in the Futuh Al Habasha : Conquest of Abyssinia as source dating back as far as the 16th century, by author: Shihabudin Ahmad bin Abd al-Qadir 'Arab Faqih or 'Arab Faqih.

Arab Faqih notes

Th clan of the Härti, people of Mait, the tribe of Jairan, the tribe of Mazzar. the tribe of Barsub all of these were Somalis and they were ordered by the Imam to hold the left

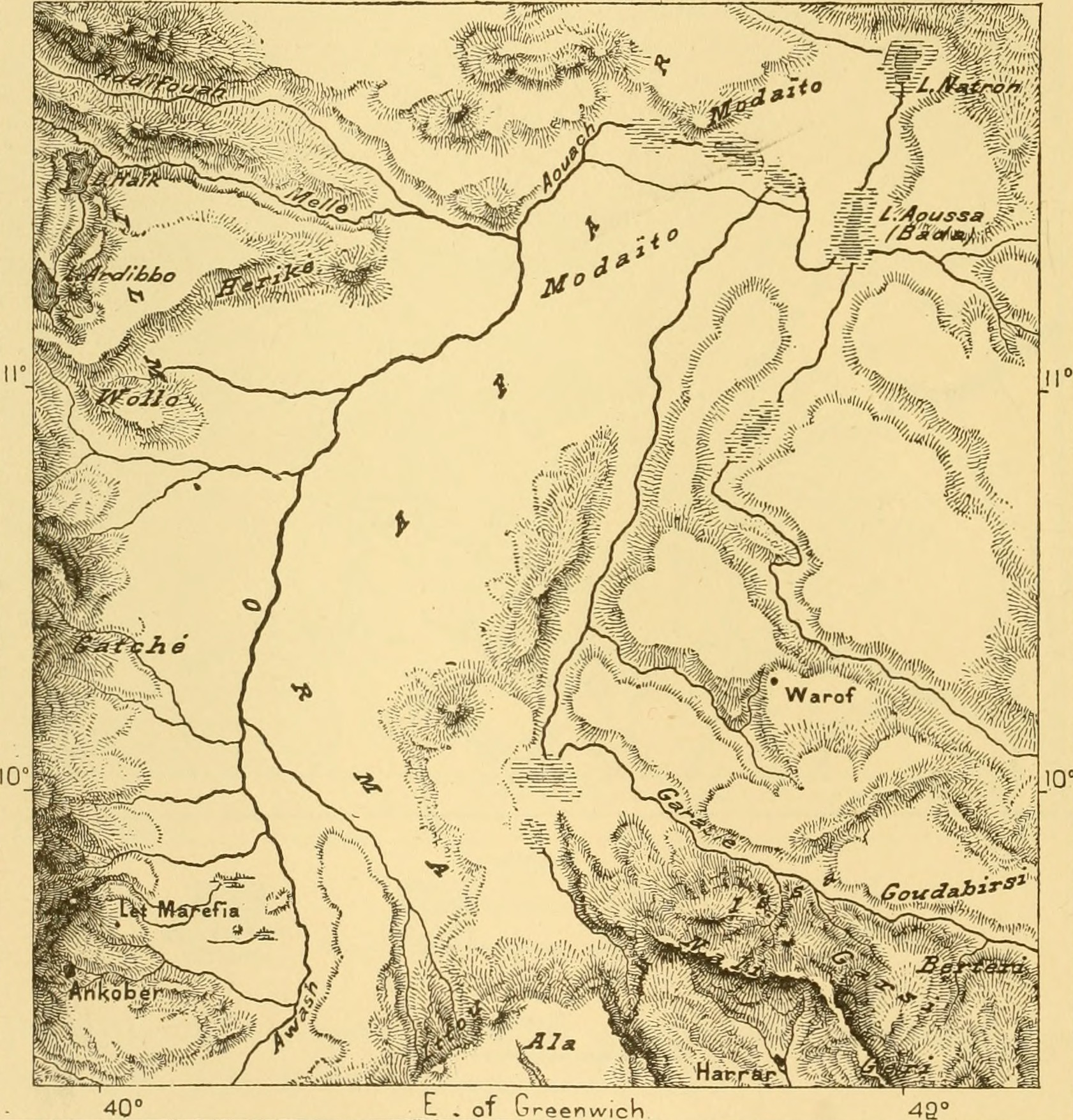
An old map of Harar featuring the Jaarso clan.

The Sultanate of Dawaro a sub-clan of the Jaarso are also mentioned in the Futuh Al Habasha : Conquest of Abyssinia as source dating back as far as the 16th century, by author: Shihabudin Ahmad bin Abd al-Qadir 'Arab Faqih or 'Arab Faqih.

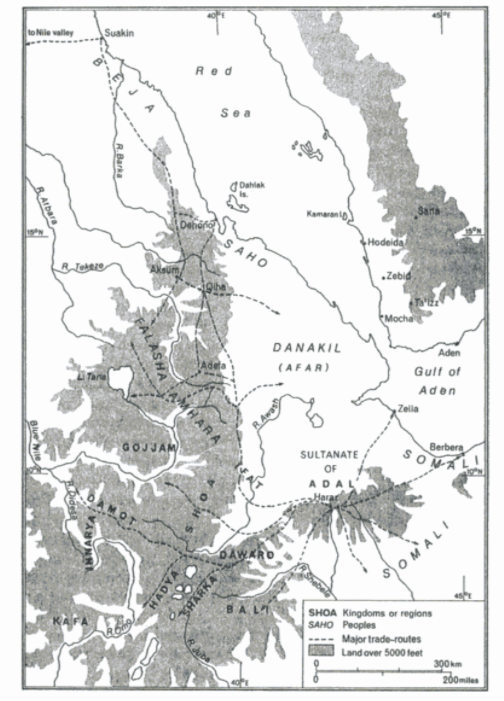
Medieval map of peoples, kingdoms and regions alongside major trade routes in the Horn

Dawaro is one of the six major sub-clans of the Jaarso and the earliest mention of this province comes from the Royal Chronicle of Emperor Amda Seyon. After occupying Ifat, Amda Seyon then proceeded to garrison Dawaro. However, in the late 1320s the ruler of the province, Haydara, ended up siding with Sabr ad-Din I during his rebellion and "treacherously" executed some of the Emperor's messengers. Amda Seyon, incensed by this act of rebellion, at once set out with his troops. On reaching Dawaro he "laid waste the country from one end to the other". He killed young men, took women and children prisoners, seized livestock "without number" and "destroyed the crops of their country". The "wicked plans of Haydara" of Dawaro were thus "brought to nothing" as the chronicler states. Dawaro was then grouped together with other kingdoms such as Hadiya, Fatagar and Ifat as a tributary kingdom to the Ethiopian Empire under the leadership of Jamal Ad-Din I. According to the Egyptian historian, Ibn Fadlallah al-Umari, Dawaro was measured five days journey by two or 100 kilometers by 40. It was much smaller than Ifat, but resembled it in that it produced cereals and fruits, and reared horses and beasts of burden. Trade however was less developed. A type of "primitive currency" called hakunas was used which were pieces of iron as long as a needle. A cow would cost 5,000 hakunas, a goat 3,000 hakunas. The social customs of Dawaro were also very similar to that of Ifat with both regions being inhabited by Muslims. Christian proselytization of the locals reached a high level of intensity during the reign of Dawit I, who then encouraged the settlement of Ethiopian military colonists to the peripheral province. However, the Ethiopian troops stationed in the region were in constant danger as their positions soon came under the attacks of Sultan Jamal ad-Din II. Emperor Zara Yaqob consolidated the supremacy of the Christian empire in Dawaro and appointed Fitawrari Barje as governor of the province. Dawaro was soon invaded by the Adal Sultan Badlay ibn Sa'ad ad-Din who faced the forces of Zara Yaqob at the Battle of Gomit, but he was defeated and killed. The next time Dawaro is mentioned is in the Futuh al-Habasa, the history of the conquests of Imam Ahmad ibn Ibrahim al-Ghazi. The province of Dawaro, because of its location to the east and its relative proximity to the Adal Sultanate became the first part of the empire to be confronted by the forces of Imam Ahmad. The Imam carried out a raid on the province in 1526-7. His men was said to take considerable loot such as horses, slaves and sheep. The Adalites planned to return to their country, but the "infidels of Dawaro" assembled a large army against them, this force was subsequently defeated. Not long after this Emperor Dawit I received news of an impending larger invasion of Dawaro, the Emperor assembled a large army that consisted of units from all over the country. This army was defeated in the disastrous Battle of Shimbra Kure, but the Imam later returned back to Harar. In the summer of 1531, the Adalites returned to Dawaro where they occupied the province, they soon ravaged the province and destroyed a large church that was erected by the Emperor's predecessor. The Imam then arrived at a settlement called Geberge and demanded that all of the Christian inhabitants either convert to Islam or pay the jizya tax. Most of the inhabitants choose to retain their religion by declaring their neutrality and agreeing to pay the tax, others agreed to be converted, among those converted were 50 Christian nobles. The Imam, much pleased with their conversion, appointed Amir Husain al-Gaturi as governor of the province. Control of the province would later fall under Ahmad's nephew, Vizier Abbas, who ruled over Dawaro as well as neighboring Fatager and Bali. Following the Imam's death and defeat at Wanya Daga, Abbas launched a fierce attack on a number of Christian towns. The young Emperor, Gelawdewos, made his way to confront him and Abbas rushed with his army to meet the Emperor. Gelawdewos was entirely victorious in this engagement and Abbas with all his captains were killed. The remaining Muslims who had survived the battle became the target of the local Christian populace who massacred all those who they could find. The Emperor then appointed Khalid, a Christian who had converted to Islam but that had reverted back to Christianity, as the provincial governor of Dawaro. Gelawdewos later faced problems with the Portuguese, he then banished 140 of them to the province of Dawaro. The presence of the Portuguese greatly displeased Khalid, he therefore ordered them to be killed or expelled from the province. Khalid attempted to ambush the Portuguese with a large army, but as soon as the assault began they shot and killed Khalid, after which most of his supporters would become their vassals. The Emperor was said to be very pleased with this outcome as he had always distrusted the governor.

The Jaarso clan also has a sub-division of the Dhanka sub-clan called Hargaya.

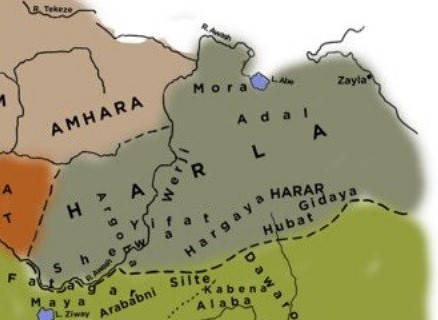
Location of Hargaya state in the middle ages

Hargaya was a historical Muslim state in present-day eastern Ethiopia. During the Ethiopian-Adal war in the sixteenth century, the people of Hargaya fought in the army of Ahmed ibn Ibrahim al-Ghazi leader of Adal Sultanate. It might not be the same Hargaya, but researcher Dilebo Lapiso and other Ethiopian Archeologists are stating Hargaya may be associated with Jaarso.

One of the Adalite military leaders, who was also from Dhanka sub-clan and fought alongside Ahmad ibn Ibrahim al-Ghazi was mentioned in “The Ethiopian Borderlands” a book by the British historian Richard Keir Pethick Pankhurst

Pankhurst states

Lenbä Dengel dispatched a large army in an attempt to regain the control of the territory, but one of the Imam’s kinsmen Sultan Muhammäd defeated it.

Under Muhammad’s astute leadership, the Adal Sultanate forces achieved unprecedented triumphs, expanding their dominion into territories such as Bali province and more important areas. However, his strategic brilliance wasn’t just about battlefield tactics, he also knew how to win without fighting through political strategic and interference by shaping the political system he wanted. Pankhurst notes

He then declared the province under his authority, and appointed governors

His legacy, both feared and admired, continued to influence geopolitics and military strategy in the region to this day.

== Clan tree ==
The Jaarso clan members consist 6 major sub-clans and are preserved their lineage and is as follows.

- Jaarso
  - Bah Bidix (junior wife)
    - Dhanqo
    - Sayo
    - Ooge
  - Bah Midig (senior wife)
    - Dawaro
    - Walabi
    - Ali (Oromo)

== Y-DNA ==
DNA analysis of Dir clan members inhabiting Djibouti found that all of the individuals belonged to the Y-DNA T1 paternal haplogroup and in Dire Dawa 82% a city in Ethiopia with a majority Dir population, which after the Issa and Gurgura, the Jaarso makes 3rd largest group in the city. All genetic analysis carried out on the Jaarso male clan members have so far shown that they exclusively belong to the T1 paternal haplogroup.

== Noteworthy Jaarso figures ==
- Sufian Ahmed Beker. He served as the Minister of Finance of Ethiopia for 20 years (1996–2015). He had the longest tenure of any finance minister serving in Sub-Saharan Africa. He then went on to serve as Chief Economic Advisor to the prime minister of Ethiopia (2015–2017). Sufian was a member of the G20 Eminent Persons Group which prepared a report entitled “Making The Global Financial System Work for All.” Sufian began his career as a lecturer at Jima Agricultural College and Addis Ababa University.
- Harun Maruf is a renowned Somali journalist based in Washington DC who works for Voice of America, he has also worked for Associated Press and BBC. He co-authored the book Inside Al Shabaab.
- Cornayl Abdi Suuri (former Somali top military and founder of WSLF
- Sakariya Abdi Usman (former Ethiopian Federal Parliamentary Assembly (lower Hause) and was one of the 122 vacant)
- Abdihalin Hassan Wara-Sayo(former Ethiopian Federal Parliamentary Assembly (lower Hause) and was one of the 122 vacant)
- Maxamud Cabdilaahi Xamare Akka Tako Xamare (former Somali Regional State Parliament and was one of the 18 other officials between 1998-2007)
- Ugaas Ibrahim Abdi Elemo (former Somali Regional State Parliament and was one of the 18 other officials between 1998-2007)
- Sa’ada Abdurahman (Speaker of the Oromia Regional state council and Speaker of the Oromia Caffee or Coffee production in Ethiopia)
- Ambassador Suleiman Dedefo (the Ambassadors of Ethiopia to the UAE and the Chief Executive Officer (CEO) of Ethiopian Metals and Engineering Corporation which works with foreign companies such as Alstom from France, and Spire Corporation from America.
- Jemal Yousuf Hassen (President of Haramaya University)
- Suldan Adam Asshabiye (Adan Darwish) (Sultan the Jaarso Tribe and their sub-clan Dhanka during the Egyptian invasion of the Eastern Horn of Africa).
- Bakhar Waare (Imam of the Jaarso, Nole, Gurgura, Habr Maqdi and Issa during the Battle of Chelenqo)
- Adam Tukale popularly known as Mullis Abba Gada (is one of the founders of Oromo Liberation Army)
- Abwaan Yussuf Haji Abdilahi Somali poet and Somali novelist
- Suldaan Haaroosh Traditional leader of Jigjiga
- Abdi Usman (Speaker if the Horyaal Democratic Front)
- Abdisalaan Siyo Barentu (first journalist of Oromo Radio in Muqdisho and one of the leaders of OLF)
- Mulaku Fanta(Deputy Commissioner of Ethiopia Federal Police)
- Sheekh Hassan Nageeye (former Mufti of Jigjiga)
- Sheekh Ciise (Former Mufti of Jigjiga )
- Sahra Ahmed Abdi (Sahra Ilays) singer-songwriter
- Abdikadir Hassan Nageeye singer-songwriter
- Nimo Hassan Farah Dhameeye singer-songwriter
