= Lapiso Gedelebo =

Ethiopian scholar and historian (1938–2025)

Prof. Lapiso Gedelebo
- ላጲሶ ጌዴሌቦ
- Born: 20 May 1938; Galla Sidamo, Italian East Africa (now Central Ethiopia Regional State)
- Died: 9 November 2025 (aged 87); Addis Ababa, Ethiopia
- Resting place: Holy Peter and Paul Church, Addis Ababa
- Education: Bicho Hosanna Mission School
- Alma mater: Eastern Mennonite University; Howard University
- Occupations: Historian; scholar; writer
- Notable work: The Long History of the People and Government of Ethiopia; The Historical Foundations and Instruments of Ethiopianism; The Role of the Red Sea and the Abbay Valley; A Brief History of the Gedeo People

Lapiso Gedelebo (Hadiyya: ላጲሶ ጌዴሌቦ; 20 May 1938 – 9 November 2025) was an Ethiopian scholar, historian and author influential on Ethiopian historiography. He wrote several books centered on ancient, medieval and modern history of Ethiopia such as The Long History of the People and Government of Ethiopia, The Historical Foundations and Instruments of Ethiopianism, The Role of the Red Sea and the Abbay Valley and A Brief History of the Gedeo People.

== Life and career ==
Lapiso Gedelebo was born on 20 May 1938 in Kufala Habele, to Muslim Hadiya and Kambata parents in Kembata-Hadiya area during Italian occupation of Ethiopia. At age 16, he had to convert to Christianity and adopt the Christian name Getahun in order to gain access to education, as Muslim citizens were denied educational rights under the Government of the Ethiopian Empire. He completed his education at Bicho Hosanna Mission School and enrolled to Emperor Gelawdewos Secondary School and the Bible Academy in Adama. Lapiso pursued undergraduate and doctoral studies in philosophy and history in the United States, then served as lecturer of Virginia Union University. He was a practicing Mennonite.

After the 1974 Ethiopian Revolution, Lapiso returned to Ethiopia to begin his historical and academical career, leading to become an influential scholar in that time. He published several books centered on history of Ethiopia such as The Long History of the People and Government of Ethiopia, The Historical Foundations and Instruments of Ethiopianism, The Role of the Red Sea and the Abbay Valley and A Brief History of the Gedeo People. His works were known for cultural unity and national awakening with deep historicial and heritage knowledge.

He served as professor of history at Haramaya University.

== Death ==
On 9 November 2025, Lapiso died after battling long illness. He was 87. His funeral was held at Holy Peter and Paul Church in Addis Ababa on 11 November. Lapiso leaves behind three daughters. Prime Minister Abiy Ahmed and President Taye Atske Selassie conveyed their sympathies regarding the passing of Lapiso.
