= Amba (landform) =

Steep-sided, flat-topped mountain in Ethiopia, usually harboring various settlement

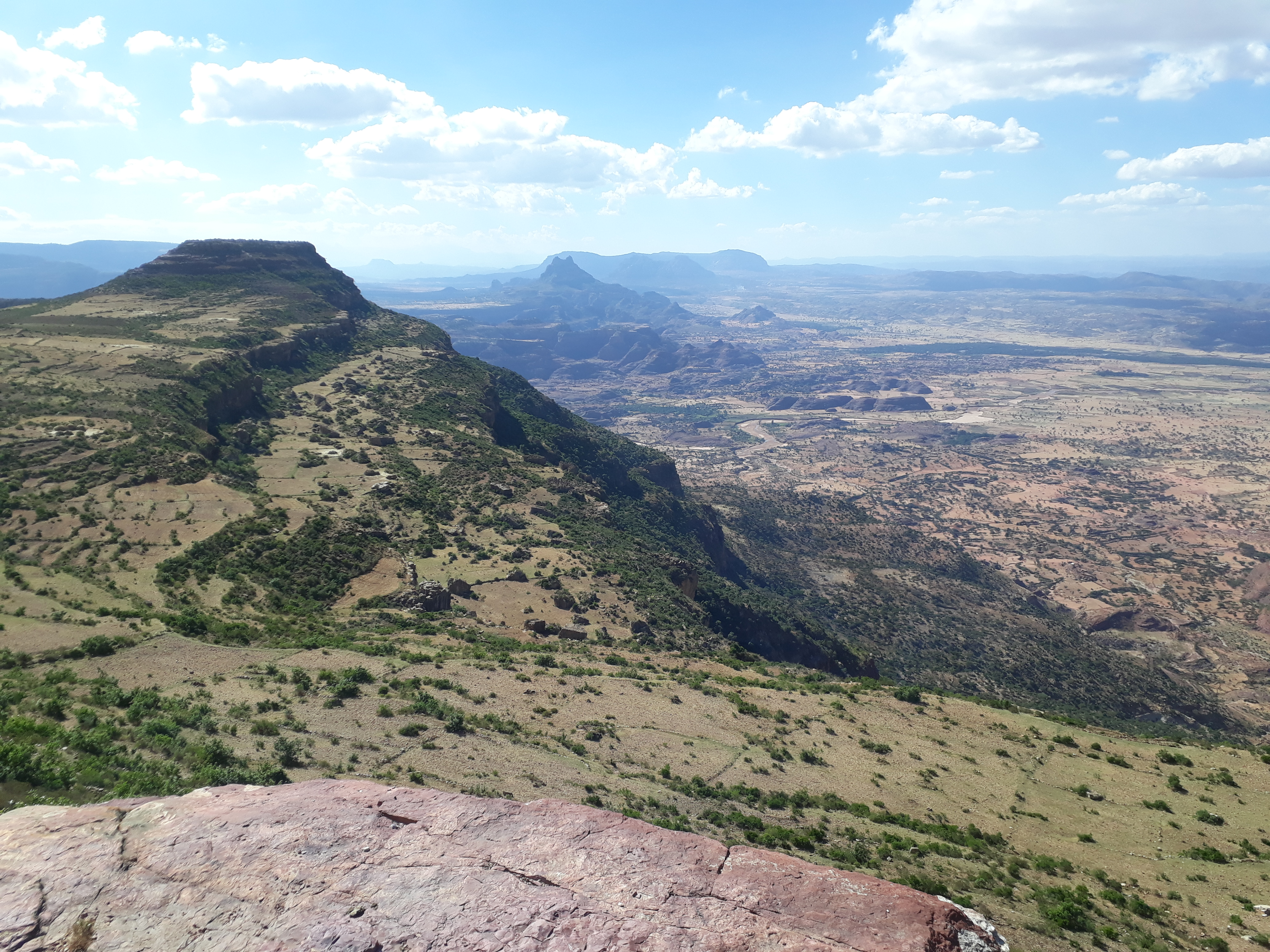
Itai Sara, an amba in Degua Tembien

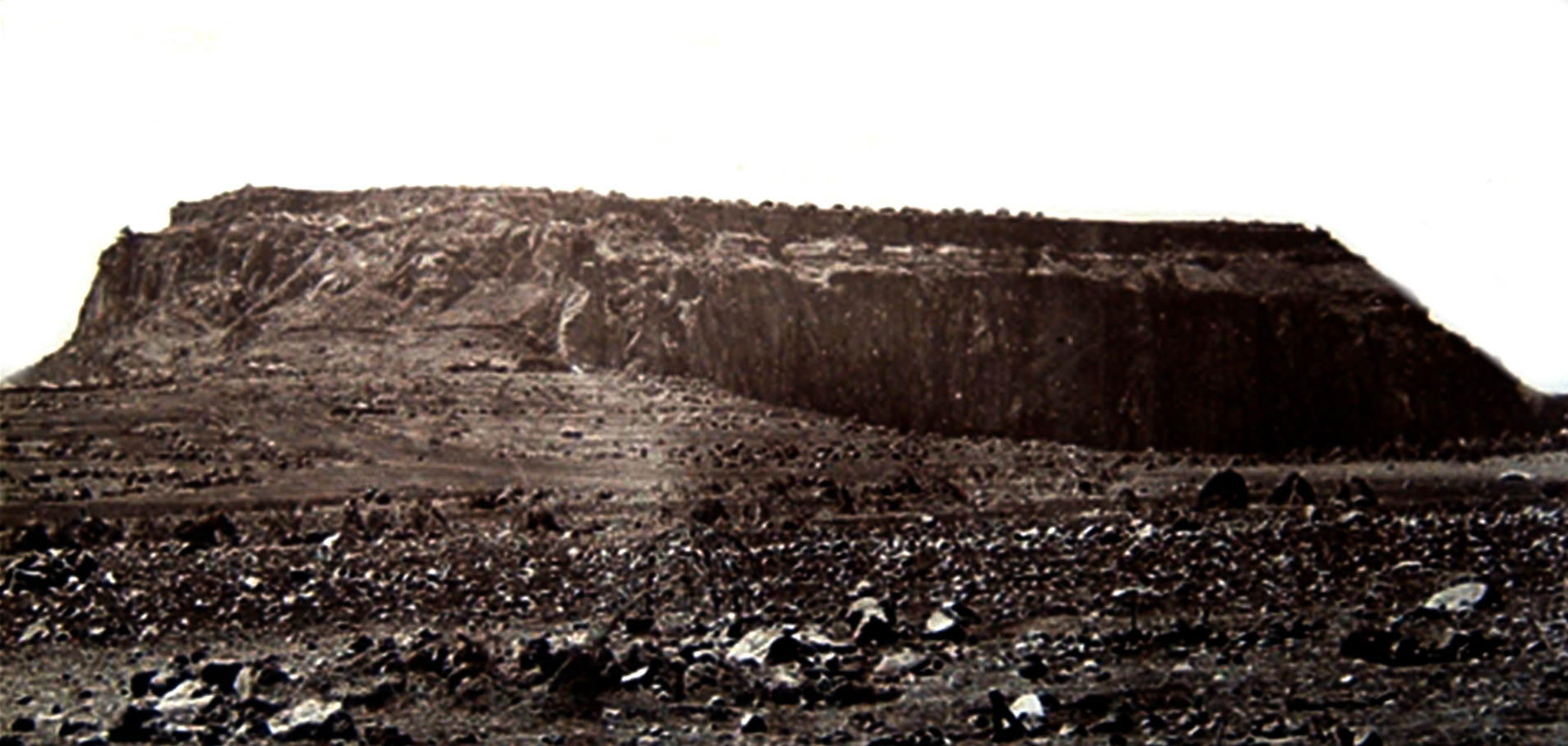
An amba hillfort before its destruction in April 1868 after the Battle of Magdala

An amba (Amharic: ዐምባ āmbā, Tigrinya: እምባ imbā) is a characteristic landform in Ethiopia. It is a steep-sided, flat-topped mountain, often the site of villages, wells, and their surrounding farmland. Such settlements were frequently located on these amba plateaus because they were very defensible and often virtually inaccessible from the ground.

The original term in Amharic indicates a mountain fortress. Amba Geshen, for example, is a historically significant amba where members of royal families were kept under guard for their safety and to prevent their participation in plots against the sitting emperor. Other noted Ambas include Amba Aradam and Amba Alagi, sites of famous battles during the first and second Italo-Ethiopian Wars.

== Notable ambas ==
- Amba Geshen: A historic prison or detention location for royal family members.
- Debre Damo: The name of both an Amba and historic Ethiopian Church.
- Magdala: Emperor Tewodros's capitol before his death during the British Expedition to Abyssinia.
- Amba Alagi: Site of three battles, in both Italo-Ethiopian Wars.

In 2008, a scientific mission identified on an amba near Harar, the Kundudo, one of just two feral horse populations in Africa.

== See also ==
- Hillfort
- Mesa

== Sources ==
- Munro-Hay, Stuart, Ethiopia, the Unknown Land: A Cultural and Historical Guide, Contributor Pamala Taor, Published 2002 by I. B. Tauris, 384 pages, ISBN 1-86064-744-8
