= Girma Yohannes Iyasu =

Ethiopian royal member (born 1961)

Prince Girma Yohannes Iyasu

Prince of Ethiopia
- Born: 1961 (age 64–65); Assebot Monastery, Assaba Tafari, Ethiopian Empire
- Spouse: Claudia Bertram
- Issue: Lij Kaerrod Girma; 2 daughters
Names
- Abeto Lij Girma Yohannes Iyasu
- Dynasty: House of Solomon
- Father: Lij Yohannes Iyasu
- Mother: an unknown Lady
- Religion: Ethiopian Orthodox Tewahedo Church

Prince (Abeto Lij) Girma Yohannes Iyasu (born 1961) is the Iyasuist claimant to the throne of Ethiopian Empire. He is also known by the name Girma Amente Ghebresillasie.

== Life ==
He is the son of Dejazmatch Yohannes Iyasu (1915-1977). Through his father, Lij Girma is a grandson of Lij Iyasu, Emperor-designate of Ethiopia from 1913 until 1916 when he was deposed by Dejazmach Teferi Mekonen with the support of the British, French and Italian Ministers (Thesiger, Brice and Coli) and excommunicated by the Ethiopian Orthodox Church, which deprived him of his rights of succession. Iyasu was the son of Negus Mikael of Sion, and matrilineal grandson of Emperor Menelik II of Ethiopia. Lij Girma Yohannes grew up in the monasteries of Asebot, Dega Estifanos (Lake Tana) and Debre Damo. At the age of 7 he left Ethiopia in 1968 with the help of Prince Louis Ferdinand of Prussia, grandson of Emperor Wilhelm II of Germany in collaboration with Lij Mered and Lij Mesfin Birru (sons of Ras Birru Woldegabriel) plus the then Governor of Djibouti. He received his education at the London School of Economics (United Kingdom), University of California, Berkeley (USA) and Universities of Heidelberg, Bielefeld and Bremen (Germany). He has also worked as an instructor and researcher at the University of Bremen, University of Miami, London School of Economics and Haramaya University (as chairman of the governing board of the university).

== Iyasuist claimant ==
Lij Girma claims that not only the governments of Empress Zewditu and Emperor Haile Selassie were illegitimate, but also that Haile Selassie himself was too far down the line of succession to claim the crown according to the rule of the Ethiopian royal house since Menelik I. As such, as a grandson of Lij Iyasu, he claims to be the leading core member of the Solomonic dynasty from the house of David and rightful monarch of Ethiopia. This however is not based or supported by any constitutional or traditional procedure, since Ethiopia did not receive its first modern constitution addressing order of succession until 1931, and the old traditional male line succession would have gone to Dejazmach Taye Gulilat after Menelik II and not to Lij Iyasu; Lij Iyasu, Ras Kassa and Emperor Haile Selassie were all descended from the royal house through female lines, and had roughly equivalent claims to each other. The claim of the Iyasuist line is based solely on the legal will of Emperor Menelik II which designated Lij Iyasu as his heir, and which opponents argue was cancelled by Lij Iyasu's excommunication.

The Iyasuist claims are challenged by the excommunication of Lij Iyasu (Iyasu V) by Mattheos X, Abuna of the Ethiopian Orthodox Tewahido Church, and the fact that Iyasu declined to be crowned, citing the fact that he did not want to occupy a higher office before he united the Ethiopians and throw out the Italians from Eritrea. He was the founder of the first Ethiopian government auditing systems, municipality, the police force and judicial reforms. He was the first monarch to build Mosques for the neglected and highly disadvantaged Muslims of Ethiopia. Lij Girma is the only one currently making an active Iyasuist claim to the throne. His pretentions are however undermined due to the very large number of descendants of Lij Iyasu that exist with an equal or arguably superior claim. His claim may also be subject to the test of loyalties according to which members who have abjured their citizenship, faith, or married non-Ethiopians may fail. Lij Girma himself, being married to a non-Ethiopian, would fail this test.

Lij Girma uses the title of H.I.H. Abeto-Hoy Lij Girma Yohannes Iyassu Menelik II ("Crown Prince of Ethiopia") as his title of pretence. The title of Crown Prince is also claimed by Leul Zera Yacob Amha Selassie the grandson of Emperor Haile Selassie I. The throne of Ethiopia since the reign of HIM Atse (Emperor) Menelik II have been subject to the guardianship of the Imperial Crown Council of Ethiopia. It was the Imperial Crown Council headed by Fitawrari Habtegiorgis Dinagde that removed the sitting(if uncrowned) Lij Iyasu (Iyasu V) for cause. The same Council elevated a royal cousin, Tafari Makonnen to be Crown Prince of Ethiopia, and proclaimed Zauditu Menelik as Queen of Kings, Lion of Judah, Elect of God and Empress of Ethiopia. The Crown Council actions paid heed to one of the wishes of Menelik II, who while alive had all but elevated his first cousin (father of Ras Tafari), Ras Makonnen, to be his successor. Ras Tafari Makonnen went on to become, again by consent of the Crown Council of the time, Emperor Haile Selassie I. The functions of the Imperial Crown Council, verification not only of constitutional legitimacy of an intendant monarch but also compliance of the same with the ancient code of the Fetha Negest is one of the most important in the Ethiopian crowns orders of succession. The Fetha Negest codes require an Emperor to be able to function in his role both as head of the nation, as well as head of the armed forces in times of conflict. The 1930 constitution of Ethiopia attempts to codify the order of succession in modern terms. But the centuries-old Fetha Negest and Fetha Negest scholars still prevail in discussions on points of law and conflict between the old and the new. Under the old Fetha Negest rules, Lij Girma's claims would be far junior to those of the male line heirs of Dejazmatch Taye Gulilat, and under the 1930 and 1955 constitutions, his claims would be non-existent. The male line heirs of Dejazmatch Taye Gulilat do not however currently make a claim on the Imperial throne.

Lij Girma's claim to fame came in the 1999 re-interment of H.I.M. Emperor Haile Selassie I when a newspaper article suggested in an interview with him that he felt the late monarch deserved his fate. He demanded to know what was done with the remains of his grandfather Lij Iyasu, and also suggested that a search be conducted for his remains and that his bones should be placed in the tomb currently occupied by those of Princess Tsehai Haile Selassie in the crypt of the Ba'eta Le Mariam Monastery where Emperor Menelik II is buried. He suggested that the Princess be reinterred at Holy Trinity Cathedral alongside Haile Selassie I and his heirs. The article was used by the EPRDF government as one of its many attempts to shed a negative light on the period of mourning for Emperor Haile Selassie and show that there were rifts within the monarchist movement. Lij Girma was widely condemned at the time for his lack of traditional Ethiopian etiquette and for the very coarse language he used in the article. Little has been heard of him in Ethiopia since.

== Family ==
Lij Girma is married to Claudia Bertram, who, since their marriage, goes by the name Princess Claudia Iyasu Menelik. They have one son:

- Lij Kaerrod Girma (Iyasu V Kifle Yacob).

Lij Girma also has two daughters from a previous relationship with the daughter of an American industrialist.

== Notable published works ==
- "Strategische Marktforschung Und Instrumente Des Strategischen Marketings" (1989).
- "Kalter Krieg Am Horn Von Afrika: Regional-Konflikte Athiopien Und Somalia Im Spannungsfeld Der Supermachte 1945-1991" (1999).
