= Anniya =

Oromo subgroup in Ethiopia

Anniya (Oromo: Anniyyaa; also spelled Anniya-Oromo, Anna-Oromo, Anniyya, and Aniya) are a subgroup of the Oromo people of Ethiopia. They belong to the Barento branch of Oromo society and are traditionally classified as a division of the Humbana Oromo. The Anniya are one of the historically recognized Oromo groups of the Hararghe region and have traditionally inhabited lowland areas associated with the former Gara Mulata province in eastern Ethiopia.

The history of the Anniya is connected with the wider history of Oromo expansion and settlement in eastern Ethiopia from the sixteenth century onward. Like other Oromo communities, the Anniya have participated in social and political institutions associated with the Gadaa system. Their territorial distribution, historical development, and social organization have been documented in studies of Oromo history and Ethiopian ethnography.

The Anniya have been discussed in major scholarly reference works, including Encyclopaedia Aethiopica, The Peoples of Africa: An Ethnohistorical Dictionary, and Muslim Peoples: A World Ethnographic Survey, as well as in studies by scholars of Oromo history and Ethiopian studies.

== Etymology and classification ==
The Anniya are part of the Oromo social organization and are traditionally classified within the Barento branch of the Oromo. Within the Barento structure, the Anniya are associated with the Humbana division. These classifications represent traditional Oromo systems of social organization, identity, and affiliation.

Gemetchu Megerssa identifies the Anniya as one of the major divisions of the Hararghe Oromo, alongside groups such as the Ittu and Afran Qallo. His work examines the relationship between Oromo identity, territory, and social organization in eastern Ethiopia.

English-language sources use different spellings for the group, including Anniya, Anniya-Oromo, Anna-Oromo, Anniyya, and Aniya.

== History ==
=== Oromo expansion and settlement ===
The history of the Anniya is connected with the broader expansion of Oromo-speaking communities across eastern Ethiopia. Mohammed Hassen's studies examine the political and demographic changes associated with Oromo expansion between the sixteenth and nineteenth centuries.

The Anniya became established among the Oromo communities of the Hararghe region, developing a distinct territorial identity within the wider Oromo social framework.

=== Historical territory ===
The traditional homeland of the Anniya is associated with lowland areas of eastern Ethiopia, particularly territories connected with the former Gara Mulata province. Historical and ethnographic studies describe the Anniya as one of the Oromo groups inhabiting the Hararghe region.

=== Gadaa system and social organization ===
Like other Oromo communities, the Anniya have historically participated in institutions associated with the Oromo Gadaa system. The Gadaa System provided frameworks for leadership, generational organization, dispute resolution, and collective decision-making.

== Geography ==
The Anniya are traditionally associated with eastern Ethiopia, particularly the Hararghe region. Their historical settlement areas include lowland territories associated with the former Gara Mulata province.

== Society and political organization ==
The Anniya's social identity developed within broader Oromo institutions while maintaining their own group identity within the Barento-Humbana classification. Oromo social organization historically connected communities through genealogical traditions, territorial relationships, and political institutions.

== Relationship with other Oromo groups ==
The Anniya are part of the wider Oromo social structure and are traditionally classified within the Barento branch. Within this classification, the Anniya are associated with the Humbana division.

Within the Hararghe Oromo, the Anniya have historically been discussed alongside groups such as the Ittu and Afran Qallo. These groups share broader Oromo cultural institutions while maintaining distinct identities based on historical territory and social affiliation.

== Culture ==
=== Language ===
The Anniya are part of the Oromo-speaking communities of Ethiopia and speak Afan Oromo.

== See also ==
- Oromo people
- Barento Oromo
- Gadaa
- Oromo migrations
- Hararghe
- Oromia Region
