= Hadiya =

Hadiya may refer to:

- Hadiya Zone, a Zone in the Ethiopian Southern Nations, Nationalities, and Peoples' Region (SNNPR)
- Hadiya Sultanate, an ancient kingdom located in South Western Ethiopia
- Hadiyya language, a language spoken by the Hadiyya people of Ethiopia
- Hadiya, Nepal, a village development committee in South-Eastern Nepal
- Hadiya people, an Ethiopian ethnic group
- Hadiyah, a village in Northern Syria
- Hadiya Khalaf Abbas, a Syrian politician
- Death of Hadiya Pendleton, murder of an American teenager
- Hadiya court case, a landmark Supreme Court of India case
- Hadiya Hossana FC, an Ethiopian football club
- Adham Hadiya, a former Arab-Israeli footballer
