= Jarso (woreda) =

District in Oromia Region, Ethiopia

Coordinates: 9°25′N 42°10′E

Jarso Jaarsoo (Oromo)
- District
- Location within Ethiopia
- Country: Ethiopia
- Region: (Oromia Region) Oromia
- Zone: East Hararghe
- Time zone: UTC+3 (EAT)

Jarso is a woreda in Oromia Region, Ethiopia. Part of the East Hararghe Zone, Jarso is bordered on the south by the Harari Region, on the west by Kombolcha, on the north by the city of Dire Dawa, on the east by the Somali Region, and on the southeast by Gursum. The administrative center of this district is Ejersa Goro.

== Overview ==
The altitude of this District ranges from 1050 to 3030 meters above sea level; Mount Gara Sirirta, Aybera, Kilisa and Bekekalu are amongst the highest peaks. Rivers include the Gideya. A survey of the land in Jarso (reported in 1995/96) shows that 19.3% is arable or cultivable, 1.7% pasture, 21.6% forest, and the remaining 57.4% is considered degraded or otherwise unusable. Khat, fruits and vegetables are important cash crops.

Industry in the woreda includes 11 grain mills employing 37 people, as well as 195 registered businesses including wholesalers, retailers and service providers; although chalk, kaolin, lead and coal are known in this woreda, none of these deposits have been mined. There were 18 Farmers Associations with 19,524 members and one Farmers Service Cooperative with 1092 members. Jarso has 36 kilometers of gravel and 62 kilometers of dry-weather road, for an average road density of 194 kilometers per 1000 square kilometers. About 19% of the urban and 4.8% of the rural population have access to drinking water.

== Demographics ==
The 2007 national census reported a total population for this woreda of 116,638, of whom 59,103 were men and 57,535 were women; 3,930 or 3.37% of its population were urban dwellers. The majority of the inhabitants said they were Muslim, with 98.27% of the population reporting they observed this belief, while 1.52% of the population practised Ethiopian Orthodox Christianity.

Based on figures published by the Central Statistical Agency in 2005, this woreda has an estimated total population of 123,556, of whom 61,592 are men and 61,964 are women; 3,104 or 2.51% of its population are urban dwellers, which is less than the Zone average of 6.9%. With an estimated area of 504.54 square kilometers, Jarso has an estimated population density of 244.9 people per square kilometer, which is greater than the Zone average of 102.6.

The 1994 national census reported a total population for this woreda of 89,410, of whom 45,097 were men and 44,313 were women; the census reported 1,736 or 1.94% of its population were urban dwellers. This total consists of an estimate for the inhabitants of all 30 rural and the one urban kebeles in this woreda, which were not counted. The main residents of these area are the different subdivisions of the wider Jaarso clan.
