= Silt'e =

Silt'e or Silte may refer to:

- Silt'e people of Ethiopia
- Silt'e language, which they speak
- Silte Zone, where most live
- Silte (woreda), a subunit of where they live
