= Père Azaïs =

French missionary and archeologist

François Bernardin Azaïs
- Born: January 31, 1870; Saint-Pons-de-Thomières, Hérault, Occitania, France
- Died: April 6, 1966 (aged 96); Toulouse, Haute-Garonne, Occitania, France
- Other name: Père Azaïs
- Occupations: missionary archeologist

François Bernardin Azaïs, commonly known as Père Azaïs, (31 January 1870 – 6 April 1966) was a French missionary and archeologist. He has been called the "father of southern Ethiopian archeology."

== Life ==
Azaïs was born in Saint-Pons de Thomière (AD34, registre 5 MI74/10 vue n°145 acte n° 20), in the French department of Hérault on 31 January 1870. He became a Capuchin friar, and shortly thereafter expressed his desire to work as a missionary.

During his 30 years in Ethiopia (1897-1913 and 1922-1936), he conducted ten archeological expeditions in southern and eastern Ethiopia. Although only some of his findings were published (Cinq années de recherches archéologiques en Éthiopie), his unpublished research is stored at the Biblioteca Cappuccini in Rome, at the headquarters of his order.

He spent his later years as an ordinary brother in the Capuchin house at Toulouse, where he died on 6 April 1966 at the age of 96.

== See also ==
- Tiya (archaeological site)
