= Chinaksen =

Town in Oromia Region, Ethiopia

Chinaksan Cinaaksan (Oromo) Jinacsani (Somali)
- Town
- Location within Ethiopia Chinaksan (Africa)
- Coordinates: 9°30′N 42°42′E
- Country: Ethiopia
- Region: Oromia
- Zone: East Hararghe
- District: Chinaksen
- Elevation: 1,816 m (5,958 ft)

Population (2007)
  - Total: 12,261
- Time zone: UTC+3 (EAT)

Chinaksen (Oromo: Cinaaksan, lit. "near the hole") (Somali: Jinacsani) is a town located in Chinaksen woreda, East Hararghe Zone of the eastern Oromia Region, Ethiopia. This city has a latitude and longitude of 9°30′N 42°42′E with an elevation of 1816 meters above sea level. Chinaksan is a historical settlement with stone walls built at the foot of an oval hill; on the hill are ruins of fortifications of Adalite origins during the Adal Sultanate period.

The writer Nega Mezlekia, an Amhara from Jijiga who had joined the Western Somali Liberation Front, relates how he participated in an attack on a Derg military training camp in Chinaksen. No prisoners were taken in the attack; those who surrendered were shot dead. Early in the Ogaden War, Chinaksen was captured by Somali units as they advanced on Dire Dawa; it was recaptured by Ethiopian units between 5 and 9 February 1978.

In late January 2009, the Ethiopian Electric Power Corporation completed a 27 km (17 mi) electric power line from Jijiga to Chinhahsan, while constructing six power distributors in the town. This provided 24-hour electric service to Chinhahsan for the first time.

== Demographics ==
Based on figures from the Central Statistical Agency in 2005, Chinaksen had an estimated total population of 11,558 of whom 5,981 are men and 5,577 are women.

The 1997 census reported this town had a total population of 7,753 of whom 3,951 were men and 3,802 women. The three largest ethnic groups reported in this town were the Oromo (69.59%), Somali (20%), and the Amhara (5.8%); all other ethnic groups made up the remaining 3.89% of the residents.

The Jaarso clan of the Somali and Oromo represent the majority of this district at 70%, with a minority of the Gadabuursi of the Dir and similarly the Geri Koombe of the Darod and the Akisho clan of the Dir. The Jaarso clan are often affiliated with the Oromo politically but genealogically belong to the Dir clan family and therefore have ties to the Somali ethnic group.

== Ruins ==
Nur Abdoche and Derbiga ruins which are largely attributed to the Harla people are found near Chinaksen.
