= Makonnen Kebret =

Ethiopian diplomat

Ambassador of Ethiopia to China
- In office September 11, 1971 – November 8, 1974
- Succeeded by: Mulugeta Estephanos

Executive Secretary of the Intergovernmental Authority on Development
- In office 1986–1990
- Succeeded by: David Stephen Muduuli

Personal details
- Born: 1935
- Died: 1990 (aged 54–55)
- Education: Imperial College of Agricultural and Mechanical Arts Dire Dawa (today Haramaya University).
- Alma mater: 1961 Master of Science of the University of Illinois at Urbana–Champaign; 1962–1964 Apptd. from Ambo Agrar School (AS).; 1964 Ph.D. Cornell University

Makonnen Kebret (1935–1990) was an Ethiopian diplomat. Makonnen Kebret was a specialist in agricultural education.

- From 1948 to 1968 he was professor and dean of the College of Agriculture, Addis Ababa University.
- From 1968 to 1971 he was associate academic vice president of the Addis Ababa University.
- From September 11, 1971 to November 8, 1974 he was first Ethiopian ambassador in Beijing.
- From 1975 to 1990 he was employed at the Awash River Valleys Agricultural Development Authority (VADA) 1977 and the Ministry of Agriculture (Ethiopia).
- From 1986 to 1991 he was Executive Secretary of the Intergovernmental Authority on Development.

== published ==
- The contribution of agricultural education to the rural development of Ethiopia. Cornell Univ., 1964
