= Kombolcha (Aanaa) =

District in oromia Region, Ethiopia

Coordinates: 9°25′N 42°00′E

Kombolcha Kombolcha (Oromo)
- Woreda
- Location within Ethiopia
- Country: Ethiopia
- Region: (Oromia Region) Oromia
- Zone: East Hararghe
- Time zone: UTC+3 (EAT)

Kombolcha (Oromo: Aanaa Kombolchaa) is a woreda in Oromia Region, Ethiopia. Part of the East Hararghe Zone, Kombolcha is bordered on the south by the Harari Region, on the southwest by Haro Maya, on the northwest by Dire Dawa, on the north by the Somali Region, and on the east by Jarso. The administrative center of the woreda is Melka Rafu.

== Overview ==
The altitude of this woreda ranges from 1200 to 2460 meters above sea level; Were Mucha, Babo and Lalu are amongst the highest points. Rivers include the Yerer, and Fefra. A survey of the land in Kombolcha shows that 16.8% is arable or cultivable, 1.7% pasture, 3.9% forest, and the remaining 77.6% is considered builtup, degraded or otherwise unusable. Khat, fruits and vegetables are important cash crops. Both Kombolcha and Haro Maya are major producers of vegetables for Djibouti.

Industry in the woreda includes 18 grain mills employing 51 people, as well as 266 registered businesses including wholesalers, retailers and service providers. There were 14 Farmers Associations with 17,216 members and 4 Farmers Service Cooperatives with 3950 members. Kombolcha has 23 kilometers of gravel and 20 kilometers of dry-weather, for an average road density of 97.5 kilometers per 1000 square kilometers. About 19.5% of the urban and 4.7% of the rural population have access to drinking water.

== Demographics ==
The 2007 national census reported a total population for this woreda of 140,080, of whom 70,967 were men and 69,113 were women; 12,615 or 9.01% of its population were urban dwellers. The majority of the inhabitants said they were Muslim, with 98.29% of the population reporting they observed this belief, while 1.42% of the population practised Ethiopian Orthodox Christianity.

Based on figures published by the Central Statistical Agency in 2005, this woreda has an estimated total population of 116,022, of whom 56,697 are men and 59,325 are women; 9,823 or 8.47% of its population are urban dwellers, which is greater than the Zone average of 6.9%. With an estimated area of 441.1 square kilometers, Kombolcha has an estimated population density of 263 people per square kilometer, which is greater than the Zone average of 102.6.

The 1994 national census reported a total population for this woreda of 82,801, of whom 42,511 were men and 40,290 women; 5,491 or 6.63% of its population were urban dwellers at the time. (This total also includes an estimate for the inhabitants of one rural kebele, which was not counted; it was estimated to have 5,348 inhabitants, of whom 2,697 were men and 2,651 women.) The two largest ethnic groups reported in Kombolcha were the Oromo (92.55%), and the Amhara (7.2%); all other ethnic groups made up 0.25% of the population. Oromiffa was spoken as a first language by 92.5%, and 7.27% spoke Amharic; the remaining 0.23% spoke all other primary languages reported. The majority of the inhabitants were Muslim, with 91.8% of the surveyed population having reported they practiced that belief, while 7.79% of the population said they professed Ethiopian Orthodox Christianity.
