= Melka Rafu =

Melka Rafu (also known as Kombolcha) is a town in eastern Ethiopia. Located outside the city of Harar in the East Hararghe Zone of the Oromia Region, it has a latitude and longitude of 9°26′N 42°7′E. It is the administrative center of Kombolcha district.

== Population ==
Based on figures from the Central Statistical Agency in 2007, Melka Rafu has an estimated total population of 12,615 of whom 6,704 are men and 5,911 are women.

The 1994 national census reported a total population for this town of 5,491 of whom 2,694 were men and 2,797 were women. These numbers for Melka Rafu are an estimate, because the town was not counted. This also means that breakdown by ethnic groups, language speakers, religion, et cetera, are not available.
