= Ejersa Goro =

Town in Oromia

Ejersa Goro Ejersa Gooroo (Oromo)
- Town
- Location within Ethiopia
- Coordinates: 9°29′N 42°14′E
- Country: Ethiopia
- Region: (Oromia Region) Oromia
- Zone: Hararge Bahaa
- District: Jarso
- Elevation: 2,780 m (9,120 ft)

Population (2005)
  - Total: 3,104
- Time zone: UTC+3 (EAT)

Ejersa Goro (Oromo: Ejersa Gooroo) is a town in eastern Ethiopia. Located outside the city of Harar in the East Hararghe Zone of the Oromia Region, it has a latitude and longitude of 9°29′N 42°14′E and an elevation of 2780 meters above sea level. It is the administrative center of Jarso Aanaa.

== Overview ==
According to the Oromia Regional government website, this town has access to telephone and postal service, but lacks electricity.

=== History ===
Ejersa Goro is best known as the birthplace of Emperor Haile Selassie I, the tenth child of Ras Makonnen, then governor of Harar, and Woizero Yeshimebet Ali, on July 23, 1892. The Emperor later erected a church, Kidane Mihret ("Our Lady Covenant of Mercy"), in the town to commemorate the event; when John Graham visited the town in 2001, although Ras Makonnen's house had been reduced to a "circle of rocks", Kidane Mihret was still standing and in use, although in worse repair than the mosque across town.

Early in the Ogaden War, Ejersa Goro was captured by Somali units; it was recaptured between 5 and 9 February 1978 by Ethiopian units advancing from Kombolcha.

== Demographics ==
Based on figures from the Central Statistical Agency in 2005, Ejersa Goro has an estimated total population of 3,104 of whom 1,529 are men and 1,575 are women.

The 1994 national census reported a total population for this town of 1,736 of whom 829 were men and 907 were women. These numbers for Ejersa Goro are an estimate, because the town was not counted. This also means that breakdown by ethnic groups, language speakers, religion, et cetera, are not available.
