= Gursum, Oromia (Aanaa) =

District in Oromia Region, Ethiopia

Gursum Gursum (Oromo)
- Woreda
- Location within Ethiopia
- Coordinates: 9°21′8.49″N 42°23′56.35″E
- Country: Ethiopia
- Region: Oromia
- Zone: East Hararghe
- Climate: Cwb

Gursum (Oromo: Aanaa Gursum) is one of the woredas in the Oromia Region of Ethiopia. Part of the East Hararghe Zone, Gursum is bordered on the south by Babille, on the west by the Harari Region, on the north by Jarso, and on the east by the Gursum district in the Somali region. The administrative center of the woreda is Funyan Bira.

== Overview ==
The altitude of this District ranges from 1200 to 2950 meters above sea level; Kondudo and Medero are amongst the highest points. Perennial rivers include the Hariro, Goro Obole, Bombas, Ejerti, and Agemsa. A survey of the land in this woreda (reported in 1996) shows that 15.7% is arable or cultivable, 8.9% pasture, 13.2% forest, 22.4% built-up, and the remaining 39.8% is considered degraded or otherwise unusable. Groundnuts are an important cash crop for this woreda. Coffee is another important cash crop; between 20 and 50 square kilometers are planted with it.

Industry in the District includes 10 grain mills and one brick factory employing 44 people, as well as 314 registered business including wholesalers, retailers and service providers; although feldspar, quartz and garnet deposits are known to exist, only dolomite and granite are quarried. There were 36 Farmers Associations with 25,727 members and one Farmers Service Cooperatives with 1336 members. Gursum has 75 kilometers of gravel and 30 kilometers of road, for an average road density of 119.7 kilometers per 1000 square kilometers. About 4.2% of the rural and 21.2% of the urban population have access to drinking water.

== Demographics ==
The 2007 national census reported a total population for this District of 151,931, of whom 77,112 were men and 74,819 were women; 12,048 or 7.93% of its population were urban dwellers. The majority of the inhabitants said they were Muslim, with 97,35% of the population reporting they observed this belief, while 2.34% of the population practised

Based on figures published by the Central Statistical Agency in 2005, this District has an estimated total population of 211,593, of whom 105,509 are men and 106,084 are women; 15,478 or 7.31% of its population are urban dwellers, which is about the same as the Zone average of 6.9%. With an estimated area of 876.57 square kilometers, Gursum has an estimated population density of 241.4 people per square kilometer, which is greater than the Zone average of 102.6. The 1994 national census reported a total population for this District of 151,405, of whom 76,2467 were men and 75,159 women; 8,657 or 5.72% of its population were urban dwellers at the time. The three largest ethnic groups reported in Gursum were (70.32%) Akisho (from the Akisho/Gurre clan), (29.8%) Arap, Jidwaaq and Karanle clans), and the Amhara (2.71%); all other ethnic groups made up 0.47% of the population. Oromiffa was spoken as a first language by 70.8%, 29.87% spoke Somali, and 3.01% spoke Amharic; the remaining 0.32% spoke all other primary languages reported. The majority of the inhabitants were Muslim, with 96.8% of the population having reported they practiced that belief, while 2.92% of the population said they professed
