= Dader =

Town located in eastern Oromia state of Ethiopia

Dader Dadar (Oromo)
- Town
- Location within Ethiopia
- Coordinates: 09°19′N 41°27′E
- Country: Ethiopia
- Region: Oromia
- Zone: East Hararghe Zone
- Woreda: Dadar

Population (2005)
  - Total: 13,710
- Climate: Cwb

Dader (Amharic: ደደር) is a town located in the East Hararghe Zone of the Oromia, Ethiopia with an altitude of 2,117 metres (6,946 ft) above sea level. It is the administrative center of the Dader District.

Between 1954 and 1967, Deder received telephone service. Records at the Nordic Africa Institute website provide details of several schools in the town during the year 1968. By 1957, a Mennonite mission had been established in the town, which included a school and a hospital.

In the 1930s, Deder was a center of coffee production, having a coffee market on the saddle between the Mounts Oubi and Miinya. The town was occupied by the Italians 21 July 1936.

== Demographics ==
Based on figures from the Central Statistical Agency in 2005, Deder has an estimated total population of 13,710 of whom 6,592 are men and 7,118 are women. The 1994 census reported this town had a total population of 7,675 of whom 3,575 were men and 4,100 were women.
