= Haramaya University =

University in Haramaya, Oromia Region, Ethiopia

- Yunivarsiitii Haramayaa
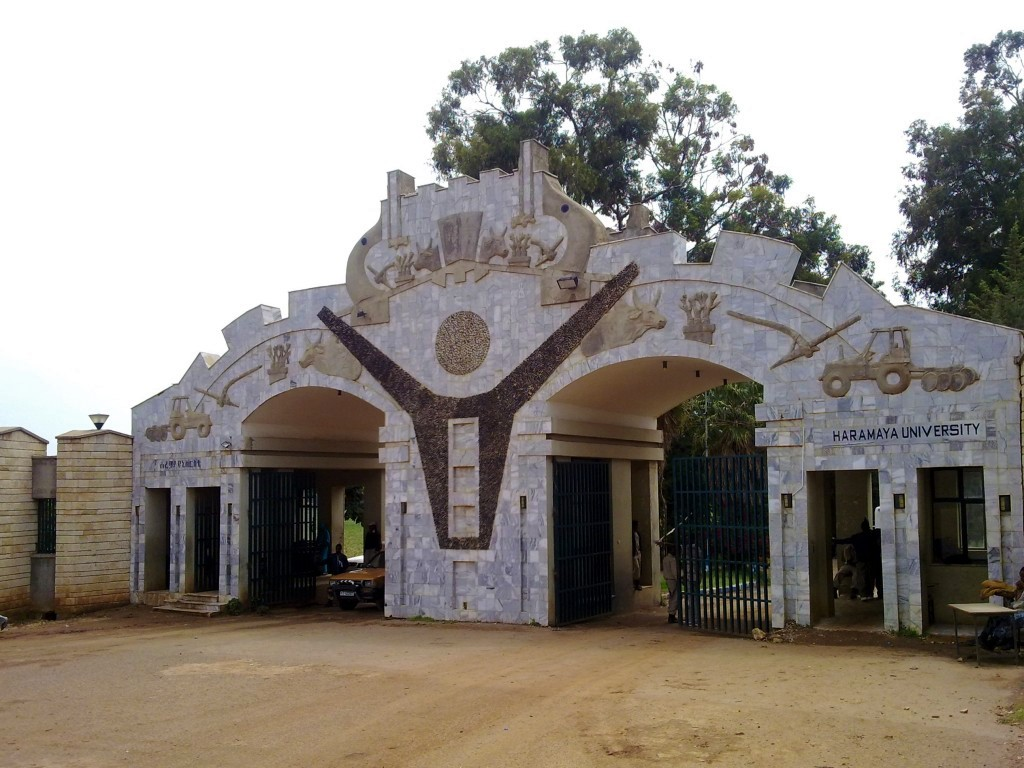
- Motto: Building the basis for development!
- Type: National
- Established: 1954
- President: Jemal Yousuf Hassen
- Administrative staff: 5,290
- Total staff: 7,850
- Students: 30,355 (2017/18)
- Location: Haramaya, Oromia Region, Ethiopia; 9.4233°N 42.0372°E
- Language: English
- Colours: Light green
- Website: www.haramaya.edu.et

- Location within Ethiopia

Haramaya University (HU) (Amharic: ሐረማያ ዩኒቨርሲቲ; Oromo: Yunivarsiitii Haramayaa) is a public research university in Haramaya, Oromia Region, Ethiopia. It is 5 kilometres (3.1 mi) west from Harar city and approximately 510 kilometres (320 mi) east of Addis Ababa. The Ministry of Science and Higher Education admits qualified students to Haramaya University based on their score on the Ethiopian Higher Education Entrance Examination (EHEEE).

== History ==
Haramaya University as "Haramaya University College of Agricultural and Environmental Sciences" was established in 1954 and it was part of Addis Ababa University until 1985 when it upgraded full-fledged university of agriculture. The university converted to multi-disciplinary university in 1996. The university named as "Haramaya University" in 2006.

On 27 May 1985, marking the historic visit of President Mengistu Haile Mariam to campus, the college transformed into University of Agriculture. By 1995/1996, the university underwent new transformation phase involving fields of Teacher Education and Health. In September 2002, two more facilities were opened: Faculty of Law and Faculty of Business and Economics.

The college offered BSc and MSc degrees and PhD in animal and range sciences; plant science; rural development and agricultural extension; natural resources and environmental sciences; and agricultural economics and agri-business. 20 MSc and 12 PhD programs can be obtained from these disciplines. The university gives two and half year BSc programs for mid-career professionals who hold diploma in agriculture and forestry. The university operates its research and extensive activities under umbrella term of Ethiopian Institution of Agricultural Research.

== Notable faculty ==
- Mitiku Haile
- Girma Yohannes Iyasu
- Lapiso Gedelebo

== Notable alumni ==
- Gebisa Ejeta, plant breeder, geneticist and professor
- Siraj Fegessa, former Ethiopia Minister of Transportation and former Ethiopia Minister of Defense
- Muferiat Kamil, Ethiopia Minister of Peace
- Fetien Abay, professor of crop science at Mekelle University
- Makonnen Kebret, agricultural educationalist
- Samia Zekaria, Ethiopia diplomat
- Gedu Andargachew

== See also ==
- List of universities and colleges in Ethiopia
- Education in Ethiopia
