= Qallu =

Medieval Clan

Regions with significant populations
- Awash Valley, Dawaro (Ethiopia)

Languages
- Early Oromo (Cushitic)

Religion
- Islam

Related ethnic groups
- Oromo people, Ifat Sultanate, Adal Sultanate

Warra Qallu (Arabic: وارا قَلّو or وارا كالو; also transliterated Warra Qallo, Warra Qalu, or Warra Qallu) refers to a historical population group mentioned in early Arabic manuscripts from the fifteenth and sixteenth centuries, associated with the Awash River valley and the southeastern Ethiopian Highlands. The name is among the written attestations connected to the Oromo people, particularly the Afran Qallo branch.Qallus are the son of Afran QALLO (Maya)

== Early Mentions ==
The earliest known reference to the Warra Qallu appears in Sīrat al-Shaykh ʿAlī ibn ʿUmar al-Qurashī al-Shādhilī al-Umawī, written by Abū al-ʿAbbās Shihāb al-Dīn Aḥmad al-Qurashī al-Hāshimī in 828 AH / 1424–1425 CE. In his biography of the Sufi scholar Shaykh ʿAlī ibn ʿUmar, the author refers to a group called Warra Qallu, located along the Awash River and its upper basin.

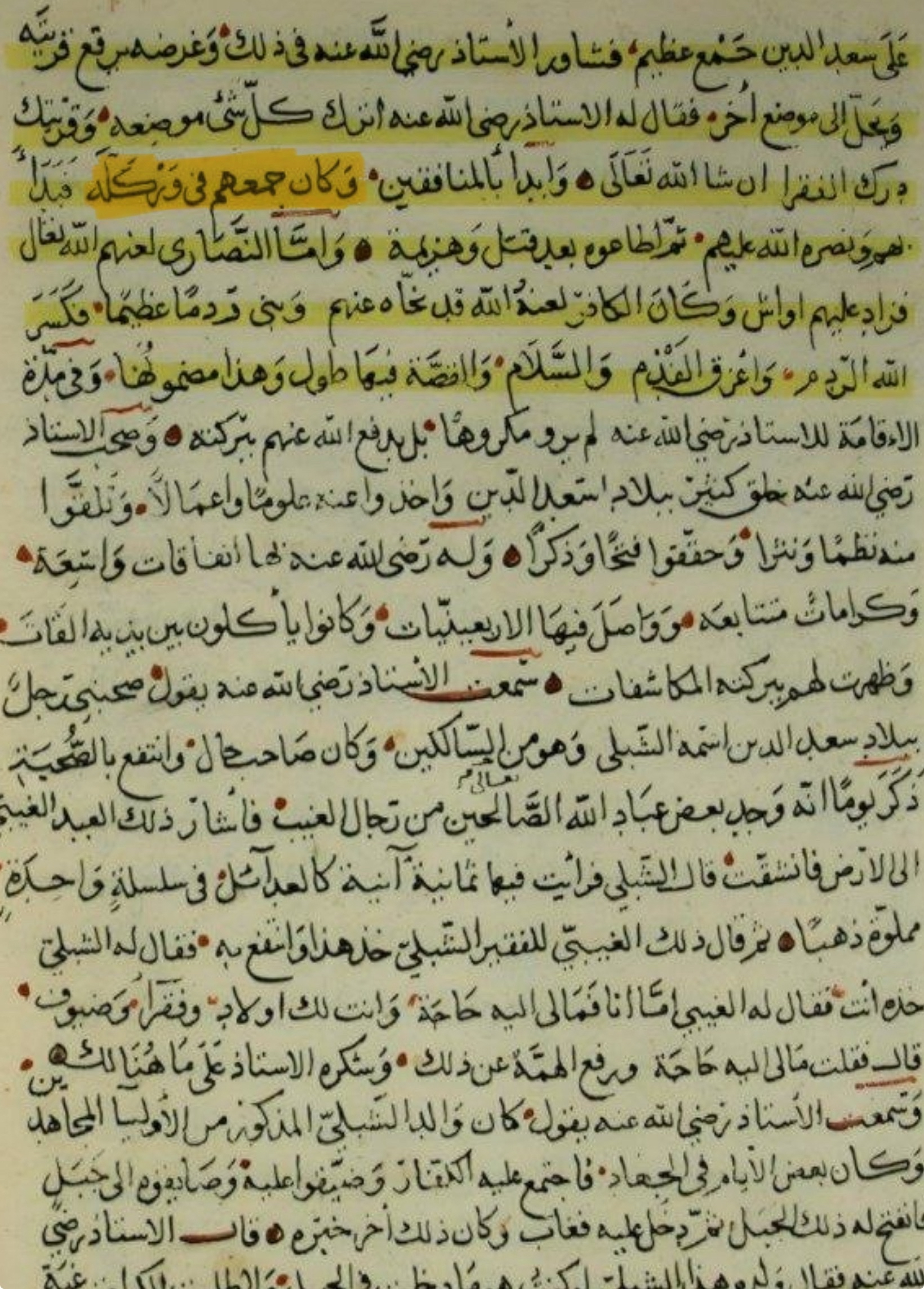
Qallu mentioned within medieval manuscripts

This passage demonstrates that Muslim chroniclers were aware of populations south of Ifat and Dawaro well before the Adal–Ethiopian wars of the sixteenth century. It suggests that organized communities—most likely Oromo were already established in the Awash corridor in the early fifteenth century.

== Geography and Ethnohistorical Context ==
The Awash basin, stretching from Shewa through Arsi and into the Afar lowlands, was a crossroads between Muslim polities such as Ifat and Dawaro, and the pastoral highland frontiers inhabited by Cushitic-speaking peoples. The Warra Qallu are thought to have lived in this transitional zone, possibly in upper Awash regions later identified as the homeland of the Qallu clans among the Oromo.

The term Warra (meaning “people” or “household” in Oromo) and Qallu (a term for a sacred leader or priestly lineage) are both Oromo linguistic features, supporting the interpretation that the “Warra Qallu” were an early Oromo community.

== Qallu history ==
A century later, during the Adal Sultanate’s campaigns, Futuh al-Habasha (c. 1540s) refers to a land called Wara Qalo or Waraqal, located north of the Wabi Shabelle River and near Jan Amba in Dawaro. The chronicler describes how Ahmad ibn Ibrāhīm al-Ghāzī’s forces passed through this district, noting its proximity to Dawaro and the fortress of Jan Amba, and identifying it as part of the Galla-inhabited frontier.

Modern historians such as Enrico Cerulli, Mohammed Hassen, and Ulrich Braukämper have noted the continuity between the fifteenth-century “Warra Qallu” and the sixteenth-century “Waragal,” both situated in the southeastern Ethiopian highlands. This continuity suggests that the Warra Qallu were an established population whose descendants were later known as the Afran Qallo Oromo, a major clan confederation influential in the Islamization and cultural shaping of southern Ethiopia.

== See also ==
- Oromo people
- Arsi Oromo
- Adal Sultanate
- Ifat Sultanate
- Futuh al-Habasha
