= East Hararghe Zone =

Zone in Oromia Region of Ethiopia

Coordinates: 8°30′N 40°40′E

East Hararghe Harargee Bahaa
- Zone
- Interactive map of East Hararghe
- Country: Ethiopia
- Region: Oromia

East Hararghe (Oromo: Harargee Bahaa) is a zone in the Oromia Region of Ethiopia. East Hararghe Zone is bordered on the southwest by Bale, on the west by West Hararghe Zone, on the north by Dire Dawa and on the north and east by the Somali Region. The Harari Region is an enclave inside this zone

Towns and cities in East Harerge include Deder, Haramaya, Bakkanniisa Oromo, Kombolcha, Miidhaga, Fadis, Qarsaa, Jaarso, Babille, Qumbii, Gola Odaa, Baddannoo, Gurawa, Kurfa Callee, Gooro Guutu, Malka Balloo, Goro Muxii, Meetta, Chinaksen and Gursum. Its highest point is Gara Muleta. Local landmarks include the Babille Elephant Sanctuary and Haramaya University.

The Central Statistical Agency (CSA) reported that 3,654.00 tons of coffee were produced in East Hararge in the year ending in 2005, based on inspection records from the Ethiopian Coffee and Tea authority. This represents 3.17% of the Region's output and 1.6% of Ethiopia's total output.

Map of the regions and zones of Ethiopia

== Demographics ==
Based on the 2007 Census conducted by the Central Statistical Agency of Ethiopia (CSA), this Zone has a total population of 2,723,850, an increase of 48.79% over the 1994 census, of whom 1,383,198 are men and 1,340,652 women; with an area of 17,935.40 square kilometers, East Hararge has a population density of 151.87. While 216,943 or 8.27% are urban inhabitants, a further 30,215 or 1.11% are pastoralists. A total of 580,735 households were counted in this Zone, which results in an average of 4.69 persons to a household, and 560,223 housing units. The two largest ethnic groups reported were the Oromo (96.43%) and the Amhara (2.26%); all other ethnic groups made up 1.31% of the population. Oromo was spoken as a first language by 97.6%, and the remaining 2.4% spoke all other primary languages reported. The majority of the inhabitants were Muslim, with 96.51% of the population having reported they practiced that belief, while 3.12% of the population professed Ethiopian Orthodox Christianity.

The 1994 national census reported a total population for this Zone of 1,830,631 in 346,117 households, of whom 933,677 were men and 896,954 women; 98,012 or 5.35% of its population were urban dwellers at the time. (This total also includes an estimate for the inhabitants of 86 rural kebeles and one urban one, which were not counted; they were estimated to have 224,057 inhabitants, of whom 112,831 were men and 111,226 were women.) The three largest ethnic groups reported in East Hararge were the Oromo (93.69%), the Amhara (4.16%), and the Somali (1.84%); all other ethnic groups made up 0.31% of the population. Oromiffa was spoken as a first language by 92.57%, 4.02% spoke Amharic, and 3.05% spoke Somali; the remaining 0.36% spoke all other primary languages reported. The majority of the inhabitants were Muslim, with 95.28% of the population having reported they practiced that belief, while 4.51% professed Ethiopian Orthodox Christianity.

According to a May 24, 2004 World Bank memorandum, 3% of the inhabitants of East Harerge have access to electricity, this zone has a road density of 39.6 kilometers per 1000 square kilometers (compared to the national average of 30 kilometers), the average rural household has 0.5 hectare of land (compared to the national average of 1.01 hectare of land and an average of 1.14 for the Oromia Region) and the equivalent of 0.6 heads of livestock. 13% of the population is in non-farm related jobs, compared to the national average of 25% and a Regional average of 24%. Concerning education, 53% of all eligible children are enrolled in primary school, and 10% in secondary schools. Concerning health, 44% of the zone is exposed to malaria, and none to Tsetse fly. The memorandum gave this zone a drought risk rating of 367.
