= Babille =

Babille may refer to:

- Babille, Ethiopia, a town in eastern Ethiopia
- Babille, Oromia (woreda), a woreda in the Oromia Region of Ethiopia
- Babille, Somali (woreda), a woreda in the Somali Region of Ethiopia
- E. J. Babille (1883–1970), American assistant film director
- Babille Elephant Sanctuary, also known as the Harar Wildlife Sanctuary, a protected area in Ethiopia
