= Babille, Somali (woreda) =

District in Somali Region, Ethiopia

Coordinates: 9°10′N 42°45′E

Babille (Somali: Babiile) is a woreda in the Somali Region of Ethiopia. Part of the Fafan Zone, Babille is bordered on the west by the Babile, Midhaga and Fedis districts of the Oromia region, on the north by Gursum district of the Faafan zone, on the east by the Dhagaxmadow district of the Jarar zone and the Qabribayax district of the Faafan zone, and on the south by Fiq district in the Erer zone. The center of this district is the Dhandhame town.

== Information ==
This district mainly compromises of the rural areas of the Babile district in which much of it was added into the Babile and Fedis district of the Oromia, the Harari Region and the Fiq district in the Erer zone in the Somali regions.

It encompasses a great majority of the Babile Elephant Sanctuary, with key areas such as Dakhate being located there, as well as towns like the district center Dhandhame, Obosha, Ceel-Baxay and Kora which are also located in this district.

== Demographics ==
Based on the 2007 Census conducted by the Central Statistical Agency of Ethiopia (CSA), this woreda has a total population of 77,317, of whom 41,629 are men and 35,688 women. While 1,273 or 1.65% are urban inhabitants, a further 17,533 or 22.68% are pastoralists. 99.29% of the population said they were Muslim. This woreda is inhabited mainly by the Karanle and Gugundhabe Hawiye as well as other Hawiye sub-clans and also has a minority of other Somali clans such as Akisho or also called Gurre and the Geri Koombe of the Darod, also the Jarso of the Dir.

The 1994 national census reported a total population for this woreda of 93,527, of whom 48,436 were men and 45,091 were women; the census identified no urban inhabitants. The largest ethnic group reported in Babille was the Somali people (99.97%).
