= Babile, Oromia (woreda) =

District in Oromia Region, Ethiopia

Coordinates: 8°40′N 42°25′E

Babile Baabilee (Somali), Baabbile (Oromo)
- Woreda
- Location within Ethiopia
- Country: Ethiopia
- Region: Oromia
- Zone: East Hararghe
- Time zone: UTC+3 (EAT)

Babile (Oromo: Aanaa Baabilee) is one of the woredas in the East Hararghe Zone of the Oromia Region in Ethiopia. Part of the East Hararghe Zone, Babile is bordered on the south and east by the Babile district of the Somali Region, on the west by Fedis and the Harari Region, and on the north by Gursum; the Fafen River defines a portion of Babille's eastern border. The administrative center of this woreda is Babille Town. Other key towns of this district include Bisidimo, Erer Weyn and Awsharif.

== Overview ==
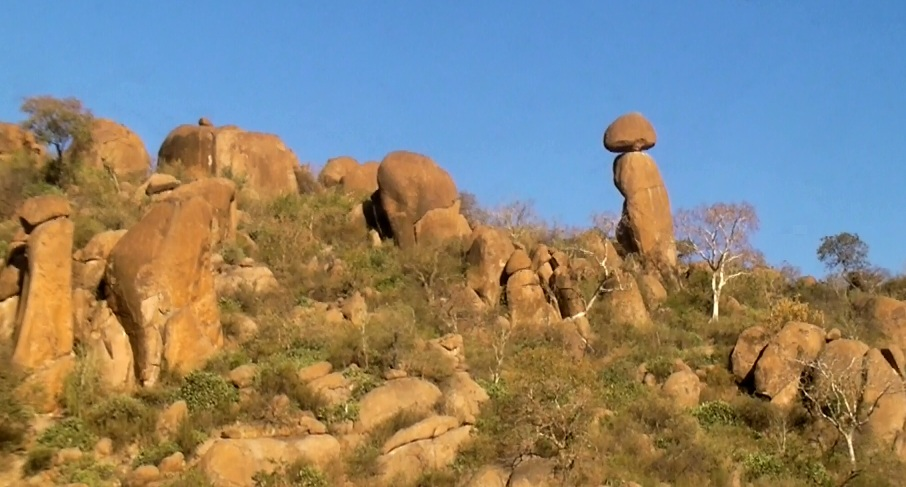
The "Valley of Marvels"

The altitude of this District ranges from 950 to 2000 meters above sea level; Ambelber and Sarbadin are amongst the highest points. Rivers include the Dakata, Barale, and Erer Tiko. A survey of the land in this woreda (reported in 1995/96) shows that 21.1% is arable or cultivable (17.5% was under annual crops), 3.9% pasture, 3.7% forest, and the remaining 71.3% is considered built-up, degraded or otherwise unusable.

Much of Babille is occupied by the Babille Elephant Sanctuary.

Oil seeds and groundnuts are important cash crops. Industry in the District includes 10 grain mills and one metalworking industry employing 39 people, as well as 160 registered businesses including wholesalers, retailers, and service providers. Although no mines are active, feldspar and garnet deposits are known to exist. There were 14 Farmers Associations with 7529 members and one Farmers Service Cooperative with 26 members.

Babille has 54 kilometers of rural feeder roads and 29 all-weather roads, for an average road density of 16.2 kilometers per 1000 square kilometers. Until recently, about 41.5% of the population have access to drinking water, but on 12 December 2007 woreda officials announced the completion of a program to improve access to drinking water, constructing wells in 17 rural kebeles at a cost of 1.1 million Birr, which extended coverage to about 48.5% of the population.

== Demographics ==
The 2007 national census reported a total population for this District of 93,708, of whom 47,178 were men and 46,530 were women; 17,712 or 18.9% of its population were urban dwellers. The majority of the inhabitants said they were Muslim, with 95.71% of the population reporting they observed this belief, while 3.4% of the population practised Ethiopian Orthodox Christianity.

Based on figures published by the Central Statistical Agency in 2005, this District has an estimated total population of 72,791, of whom 35,912 are men and 36,879 are women; 16,454 or 22.60% of its population are urban dwellers, which is greater than the Zone average of 6.9%. With an estimated area of 5,120.63 square kilometers, Babille has an estimated population density of 14.2 people per square kilometer, which is less than the Zone average of 102.6.

The 1994 national census reported a total population for this District of 50,204, of whom 25,419 were men and 24,785 women; 9,195 or 18.32% of its population were urban dwellers at the time. (This total also includes an estimate for the inhabitants of several rural wards, which were not counted; they were estimated to have 2,134 inhabitants, of whom 1,116 were men and 1,018 women.) The three largest ethnic groups reported in Babille were the Somali (85.77%), Oromo (10.77%), and the Amhara (3.76%); all other ethnic groups made up 1.03% of the population. Somali was spoken as a first language by 84.97%, Afaan Oromo by 9.76%, and 4.58% spoke Amharic; the remaining 0.69% spoke all other primary languages reported. The majority of the inhabitants were Muslim, with 98.89% of the population having reported they practiced that belief, while 2.84% of the population said they professed Ethiopian Orthodox Christianity.
