= Fedis =

District in Oromia Region, Ethiopia

Coordinates: 8°50′N 42°00′E

Fedis Fadis (Oromo)
- Woreda
- Location within Ethiopia
- Country: Ethiopia
- Region: (Oromia Region) Oromia
- Zone: East Hararghe
- Time zone: UTC+3 (EAT)

Fedis (Oromo: Aanaa Fadis) is a woreda in Oromia Region, Ethiopia. Part of the East Hararghe Zone, Fedis is bordered on the southwest by Garamulleta zone, Meyumuluke woreda, on the west by Girawa, on the northwest by Haro Maya, on the north by the Harari Region, on the east by Babille, and on the southeast by the Erer River which separates it from the Somali Region at south by Midega tola district. The administrative center of this district is Boko.

Fedis was a historical region mentioned as far back as the fourteenth century.

== Overview ==
The altitude of this woreda ranges from 500 to 2100 meters above sea level; Hakim Gara is the highest point. A survey of the land in Fedis (reported in 1995) shows that 10.8% is arable or cultivable, 24.7% pasture, 19.5% forest, and the remaining 45% is considered built-up, degraded or otherwise unusable. The Harar Wildlife Sanctuary is a local landmark. Groundnuts and onions are important cash crops.

Industry in the woreda includes 18 grain mills employing 48 people, as well as 231 registered businesses including wholesalers, retailers and service providers. There were 23 Farmers Associations with 29,713 members and 4 Farmers Service Cooperatives with 346 members. Fedis has only dry-weather roads, but how many is not known. About 19.1% of the urban and 1.8% of the rural population have access to drinking water.

== Demographics ==
The 2007 national census reported a total population for this woreda of 113,108, of whom 57,250 were men and 55,858 were women; 4,574 or 4.04% of its population were urban dwellers. The majority of the inhabitants said they were Muslim, with 99.22% of the population reporting they observed this belief.

Based on figures published by the Central Statistical Agency in 2005, this woreda has an estimated total population of 207,473, of whom 101,410 are men and 106,063 women; 4,638 or 2.24% of its population are urban dwellers, which is less than the Zone average of 6.9%. With an estimated area of 2,150.63 square kilometers, Fedis has an estimated population density of 96.5 people per square kilometer, which is less than the Zone average of 102.6.

The 1994 national census reported a total population for this woreda of 150,253, of whom 77,256 were men and 72,997 women; 2,595 or 1.73% of its population were urban dwellers at the time. (This total also includes an estimate for the inhabitants of several rural kebeles, which were not counted; they were estimated to have 25,507 inhabitants, of whom 13,040 were men and 12,467 women.) The largest ethnic group reported in Fedis was the Oromo (98.95%), and Oromo was spoken as a first language by 98.97% of the population. The majority of the inhabitants were Muslim, with 99.15% of the population having reported they practiced that belief.
