= Babile (town) =

Town located in Oromia state of Ethiopia

- Town
- Location within Ethiopia
- Coordinates: 9°13′N 42°20′E
- Country: Ethiopia
- Region: Oromia
- Zone: East Hararghe Zone
- Woreda: Babille woreda
- Elevation: 1,648 m (5,407 ft)
- Time zone: UTC+3 (EAT)

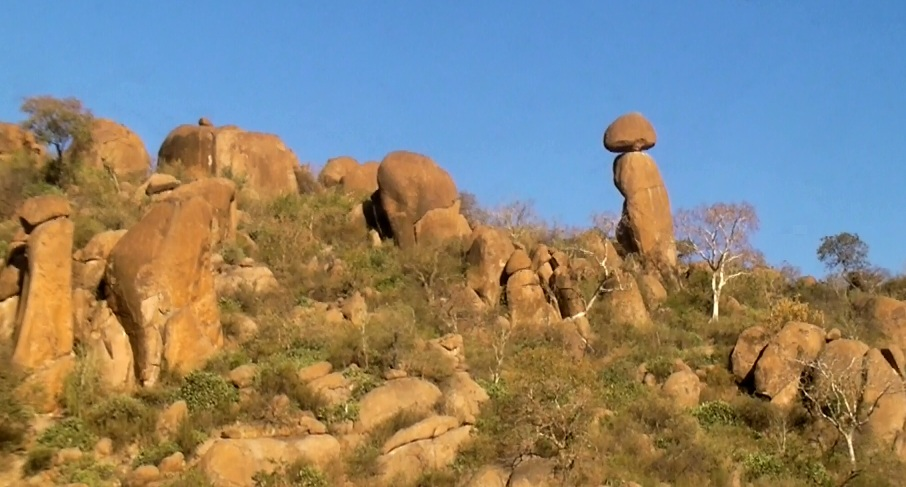

Babile (Oromo: Baabbile; Somali: Baabili) is a town located in East Hararghe, Oromia. It is the administrative center of Babille woreda, and the woreda's largest town. Babille is known for its mineral water and nearby elephant sanctuary.

== Overview ==
The town is located on the main road between Harar and Jigjiga, and is known for its mineral water and the Babille Elephant Sanctuary. The Dakhata Valley (also called the "Valley of Marvels"), known for its rock formations, lies seven kilometers from the town.

Nearby is the pass known as the Babile Gap, which was used as a strongpoint by the Italians in 1941 during the Second World War, who withdrew after two days of attacks by South African and Nigerian forces; the next year the town was "pillaged and burnt". In 1977 (the time of the Ogaden War) there were clashes with Somali forces in the town.

Babille is reported to have had telephone service by 1967.

== History ==
The area was originally inhabited by the Somali and Oromo people; it was part of the Harar Emirate, and was later governed by the Egyptians in the late 19th century until the Amharic expansion during Menelik II's conquests covered the Harar area. Cattle from the people of the Babile area were taken to feed Menelik's army. The town was a small farming community but grew to be a trading town under Egyptian rule. Continuous migration of Amhara people from the west (as well as Tigrayans) changed the demographics considerably as well as the character of the town, which became important enough to acquire a church, a school, a telephone post. Shops and coffee bars were typically owned by Harari, Arabs, and Amhara.

The revolutionary government of the People's Democratic Republic of Ethiopia attempted to change the originally feudal system installed in the area but found it difficult, in the Babile area, to impose banking and landownership reforms--nationalization and collectivization. In a 1990 study, Leendert Jan Slikkerveer identified four strata in Babile society, many of them with mixed ethnic groups, but Amhara dominated the administrative class while Oromo and Somali dominate the traditional class of religious and ethnic leaders.

== Demographics ==
A 1990 publication cites a total population of around 4,000.

Based on figures from the Central Statistical Agency in 2005, the town has an estimated total population of 16,454 of whom 8,386 are men and 8,068 are women. The 1994 national census reported this town had a total population of 9,195 of whom 4,548 were men and 4,647 were women. It is the largest town in Babile Woreda.
