= Midega Tola (Aanaa) =

- District
- Location within Ethiopia
- Country: Ethiopia
- Region: (Oromia Region) Oromia
- Zone: East Hararghe Zone

Midega Tola (Oromo: Aanaa Miidhagaa Tolaa) is a district of Oromia, Ethiopia.

== See also ==
- Districts of Ethiopia

Midaga Tola(Midaga Lola), East Hararghe Zone, Oromia, Ethiopia
