= Battle of Dire Dawa =

1977 battle between Ethiopia and Somalia

- Part of Ogaden War
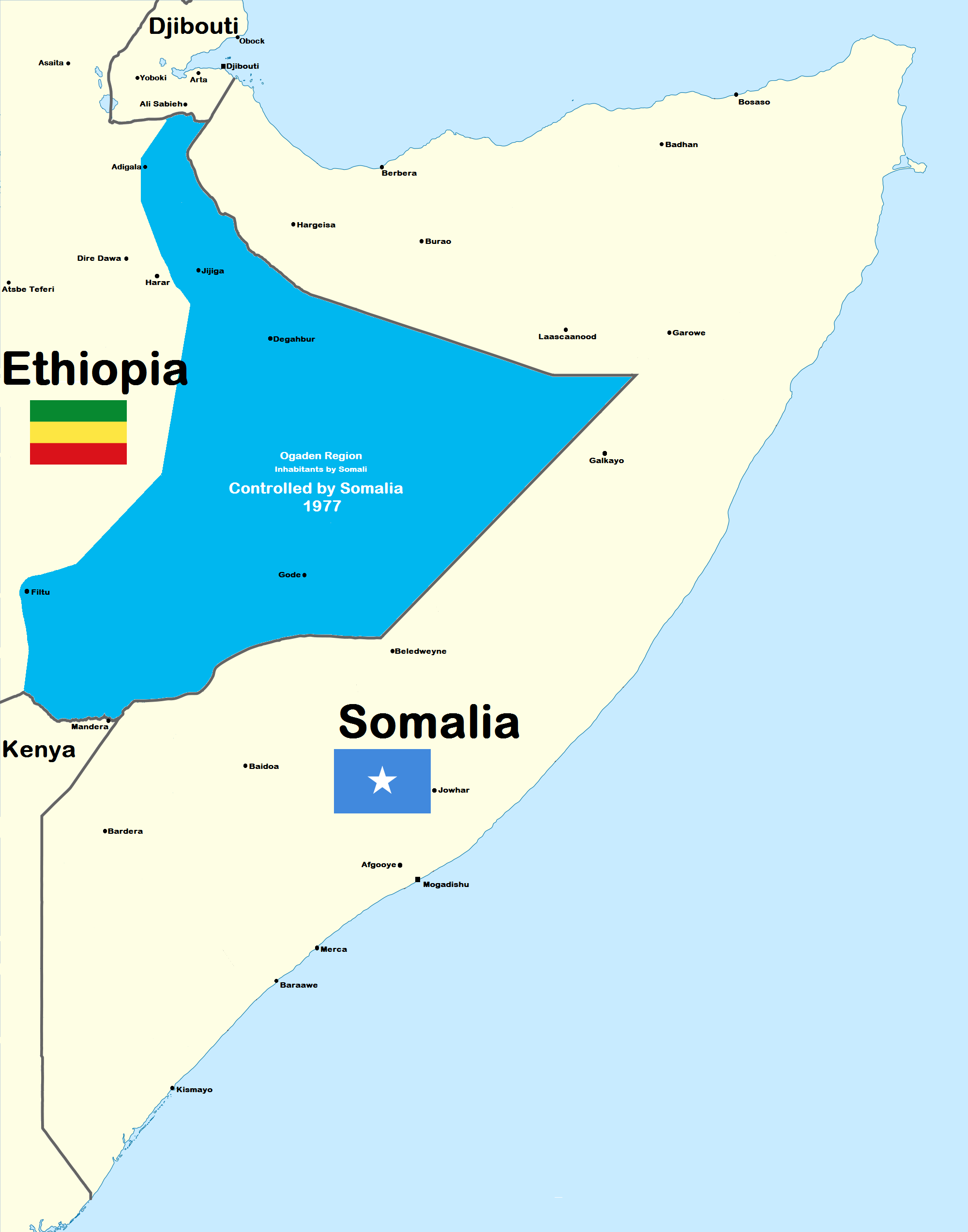
- Ethio-Somali War Map 1977
Date	July 1977 – August 1977
Location	Dire Dawa, Ethiopia
Result	Ethiopian victory

Belligerents
Ethiopia	Somalia

Strength
1 Militia Division; 2 Infantry Battalions; 1 Mechanized Company; 2 tanks	3,000 soldiers 32 T-54/55 tanks BM-13 launchers

Casualties and losses
150 soldiers killed 1 F-5 destroyed 8 Saab B 17 destroyed 1 T-28 Trojan destroyed 1 M-41 destroyed	At least 700 soldiers killed (per Ethiopia); 21 T-54/55 lost 5 APCs lost 3 BM-13 launchers lost

The Battle of Dire Dawa were a series of battles that took place between 17 July and 17 August 1977 between Ethiopian Armed Forces and Somali Armed Forces near the town of Dire Dawa, Ethiopia and adjacent to the airfield of the same name during the Ogaden War.

== Battle ==
The first attempt to storm Dire Dawa by the Somalis was made on July 17 at 04:30 with attacking forces totalling three mechanized battalions. The attack was repulsed at the cost of 79 Ethiopian soldiers dead; Ethiopians estimated the loss of Somalis twice as high. As a result of the attack, Somalis breached the Dire Dawa airfield destroying an F-5E aircraft of the Ethiopian 9th Air Force with an RPG.

The second phase of the assault was launched on 17 August 1977, with Somalian forces consisting of an infantry battalion and 32 tanks. On the outskirts of the city, three Somali tanks were destroyed by mines. Somali tanks managed to pass the Ethiopian resistance and break through to the airfield near the city; during the assault the entire airfield was damaged, including the control tower. Nine aircraft were destroyed and at least one more damaged; one Ethiopian M-41 tank and a fuel storage facility were destroyed as well. Ethiopia began an emergency transfer of reinforcements from Harar consisting in more militias, tanks and gun-mounted BRDMs, but only massive Ethiopian air raids were able to stop the Somali tanks, destroying 16 T-55s. At the end of the day the attackers ran out of steam and fled, leaving a trail of equipment that included tanks, armored cars, rocket launchers, artillery pieces, and hundreds of rifles and machine guns that were proudly put on display by the Ethiopians. Henceforth, the city was never seriously at risk of falling.

== Losses ==
During the assault on the airfield, ten Ethiopian aircraft were destroyed: one Northrop F-5E, eight Saab B 17s piston dive bombers, and one T-28 Trojan. A civilian Boeing 707 was also damaged. An Ethiopian M41 light tank was also destroyed.

According to the Ethiopians, the Somalis lost during the battle 21 of the 32 T-55 tanks involved. As proof, the Ethiopians showed Western media journalists 11 wrecked Somali tanks, some of which were abandoned because they were stuck in the mud. Other vehicles lost by attacking Somali forces were thirty military trucks, five armoured personnel carriers, three BM-13 launchers and a howitzer.
