= Babile Elephant Sanctuary =

Wildlife sanctuary in Oromia Region, Ethiopia

- IUCN category II (national park)
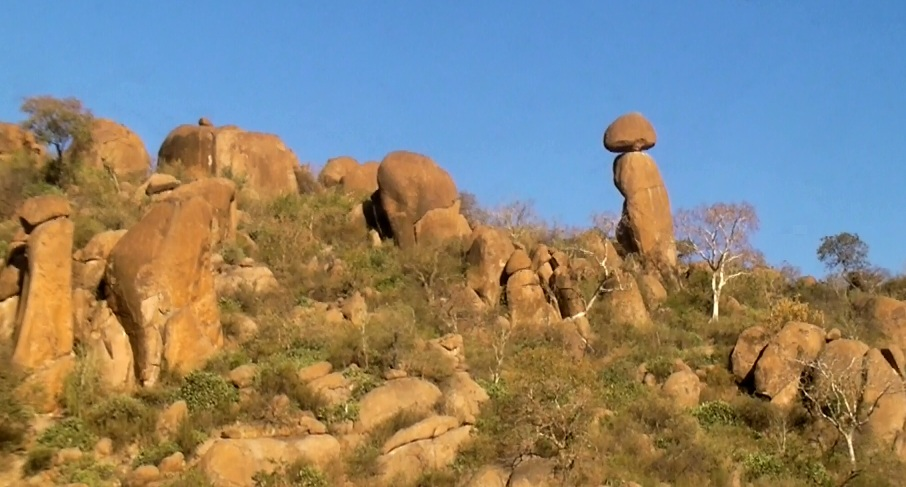
- The Valley Of Marvels

- Location within Ethiopia
- Location: Oromia Region, Ethiopia
- Nearest city: Harar
- Coordinates: 8°45′N 42°38′E
- Area: 6,982 km^{2} (2,696 sq mi)
- Established: 1970
- Governing body: Ethiopian Wildlife Conservation Authority (EWCA)

The Babile Elephant Sanctuary is a protected area and wildlife sanctuary in eastern Ethiopia. It is located in Babile district, East Hararghe Zone of Oromia Region, which lies 560 km (350 mi) east of Addis Ababa and 40 km (25 mi) south of Harar.

== Geography ==
Encompassing 6,982 km^{2} (2,696 sq mi), the sanctuary embraces the valleys of the Erer, Dakata and Fafen as well as the Gobele and Borale rivers; all are tributaries of the Shabelle River. Elevations range from 1000 to 1750 meters above sea level, with the lowest elevations at the southern part of the protected area. Located near Dakata River valley, the sanctuary presents a landmark to one of the most unique lower hoodoos, originated during the Precambrian era, known as the Valley Of Marvels or Dakata's Rock Valley which provide a good attraction for tourists.

== Wildlife ==
=== Flora ===
A study published in 2011 states that Babile Elephant Sanctuary has 237 plant species. In addition to its vegetation, the sanctuary is covered in semi-arid areas of dense Acacia woodlands, thick scrublands, closed savannahs, evergreen shrubs, and widespread cactus areas. The woody species such as umbrella thorn acacia, Dwarf Euphorbia, thorny acacia, Acacia etbaica, Egyptian balsam, Prickly pear, Balanites glabra, Bird plum, Snuff-box tree, Toothbrush tree, and Tamarind that accounted for only 1.4% of the total density which are considered near threatened. Even though prickly pear cactuses are invasive to Ethiopia since the 18th century, they are considered sustainable for elephants to feed during arid conditions. Anteneh Belayneh noted in 2011 that Lantana camara is a major threat to the sanctuary.

=== Fauna ===
Babile Elephant Sanctuary is home to 36 mammalian species. The sanctuary provides a home to native subspecies of African bush elephant (Loxodonta africana oleansie) living in the western areas of the sanctuary with a population of at least 200-300 individuals recorded. Other mammals living in the sanctuary include the Hamadryas baboon, Günther's dik-dik, Bohor reedbuck, Phillip's dik-dik, Menelik's bushbuck, Soemmerring's gazelle, warthog, greater kudu, and lesser kudu. Carnivores such as lion, leopard, Spotted hyena, Striped hyena, Rusty-spotted genet, White-tailed mongoose, Dwarf mongoose, and Black-backed jackal are regularly observed within the sanctuary. Smaller mammals such as Rock hyraxes, Elephant Shrews, Galagos, Horseshoe bats, Abyssinian hares, Ground squirrels, and Naked mole-rats are common in these habitats. A study done between 2004 and 2008 claimed that the sanctuary "now supports approximately 27% of the elephant population in Ethiopia."

The bird list of 227 species includes the Salvadori's seedeater (Crithagra xantholaema), which is endemic to southeastern Ethiopia.

== Conservation ==
=== Threats ===
From the 1970s-80s, Babile Elephant Sanctuary was established to protect the remnants of Northeastern African elephants following the loss of 90% of its population in Ethiopia caused by illegal poaching. However, the elephant population of the sanctuary is under critical condition due to habitat loss and illegal poaching. In addition to the effect of elephant population decline, researchers discovered that human activities such as illegal farming, ethnic conflict, overgrazing of livestock, and deforestation caused by local settlement of pastoralists and farmers, who lived within the sanctuary, disrupt elephants' migratory patterns and feeding areas resulting in human-elephant conflict. As a result, the sanctuary lost partial northwestern areas to the illegal settlement with seventy-five percent of land converted to agriculture and land grazing. Invasive plants such as lantana flowers and long-thorn kiawe shrubs start to intoxicate the environment, most likely threatening livestock and wildlife.

=== Visitor accommodations and reconstruction plans ===
The sanctuary suffers poor management from the park rangers because of its unfunded effect from training, poverty, and environmental neglect. Conditions at this sanctuary are primitive, and it is not equipped for tourists, but the Ethiopian Ministry of Agriculture and Rural Development has announced plans to remedy this shortcoming. In addition to protecting elephants and restoring the sanctuary's former areas, Born Free Foundation, Elephant Protection Initiative, Elephant Crisis Fund, and Ethiopia Wildlife Conservation Authority set up discussions on developing a field project to help restore the sanctuary's area and legal management which requires attention from both government and the people.
