= Behi =

Behi is both a given name and a surname. Notable people with the name include:

- Behi Djanati Atai, French actress
- Alain Behi (born 1978), Ivorian footballer
- Ridha Behi, Tunisian director
- Symphora Béhi (born 1986), French sprinter
- Oueil Behi Mohamed (born 1949), Tunisian volleyball player
- Bioenergy Economy-based Health Improvement (BEHI)
