= Mustafa al'Absi =

Professor of Behavioral Medicine and Neuroscience

Mustafa al’Absi
- Occupations: Psychologist, author and academic

Academic background
- Education: BSc., Biology and Psychology; PhD., Clinical Psychology, Psychophysiology
- Alma mater: Cairo University, NDSU; University of Oklahoma

Academic work
- Institutions: University of Minnesota

Mustafa al’Absi (born October 24, 1965) is a research and academic leader and an author who is a Professor of Behavioral Medicine and the holder of the Max & Mary La Due Pickworth Chair at the University of Minnesota Medical School. He is also the current Director of the Duluth Global Health Research Institute (DGHR). He was the founding director of the Duluth Medical Research Institute (DMRI), the Behavioral Medicine Laboratories, and the Khat Research Program (KRP). al’Absi is known for his pioneering research into the role of stress and trauma in predicting escalation of substance use and relapse as well as mental health comorbidity. He identified the link between deficient hormonal responses to stress and risk for smoking relapse, and that these hormonal changes explain some of the mood and cognitive challenges experienced by tobacco users when they abstain from smoking.

al’Absi has published over 250 research articles, chapters, and books, focusing on stress neurobiology and psychophysiological reactivity, psychological trauma, addiction, relapse, and comorbid depression and PTSD.

== Education and early career ==
al’Absi completed his undergraduate degree in Psychology and Biology at Cairo University, graduating with distinction and honors. He was then appointed as the first psychology academic personnel in Psychology at Sanaa University. Supported by a Fulbright Fellowship, he moved to the United States to complete his graduate studies at the University of Oklahoma. Following the completion of his internship training in Clinical Psychology, he joined the University of Minnesota as a faculty member of the Medical School and director of its Behavioral Medicine curriculum in Duluth.

== Career in Minnesota ==
After completing his graduate training and clinical internship in 1997, al’Absi joined the University of Minnesota Medical School as an Assistant Professor of Behavioral Medicine, later becoming Associate Professor in 2002 and Professor in 2006. Since 2007, he has held the title of Max & Mary La Due Pickworth Chair at the University of Minnesota Medical School. From 2007 to 2015, al’Absi was the Founding Director of the Duluth Medical Research Institute. He has also served as Director of the Behavioral Medicine Laboratories at the University and the Stress and Resilience Research Labs.

Nationally, al’Absi held the presidency of the Society for Biopsychosocial Science and Medicine (SBSM), previously the American Psychosomatic Society, in 2015–2016, and served on the board of directors for the Society for Psychophysiological Research (SPR) and the Academy for Behavioral Medicine Research (ABMR). al’Absi is a fellow of the Academy for Behavioral Medicine Research (ABMR), the Society for Biopsychosocial Science and Medicine, the Society for Research on Nicotine and Tobacco, and the Association for Psychological Science.

al’Absi co-led multiple IBRO schools and conferences in Africa focusing on addiction and mental health comorbidity in Rabat, Morocco (2013); Jimma, Ethiopia (2014); Gaborone, Botswana (2015); Monastir, Tunisia (2016); Cape Town, South Africa (2018); Hammamet, Tunisia (2018); and Kampala, Uganda. He also led or co-organized conferences and workshops in collaboration with the Africa and Middle East Congress on Addiction (AMECA), the Society of Neuroscientists of Africa (SONA), University of Monastir, Stellenbosch University, Mohammed V University in Rabat, Haramaya University, University of Botswana, University of Nairobi, and Technical University of Mombasa.

== Research ==
al’Absi's research program, spanning over 30 years, focuses on the psychobiological mechanisms linking stress, early life adversity, and trauma to addiction, appetite regulation, pain perception, and cardiovascular health, employing integrated laboratory, clinical, and naturalistic methodologies to translate findings into targeted interventions. His research focuses on the hypothalamic–pituitary–adrenal axis, the endogenous opioid system, the sympathoadrenal system, and the endocannabinoid system. The research has demonstrated that dysregulated hypothalamic–pituitary–adrenocortical (HPA) responses, characterized by basal hypercortisolism and blunted acute reactivity, predict early relapse in nicotine and stimulant addiction, while stress-induced changes in appetite hormones (e.g., elevated ghrelin, blunted PYY) drive post-cessation weight gain and craving, particularly in women and trauma-exposed individuals. al'Absi’s early work established stress-induced hypoalgesia and exaggerated cardiovascular responses as endophenotypes for hypertension. He has served as the Principal Investigator and lab director and has published more than 250 scientific articles and several books and book chapters. His research has been published in high-impact journals including Nature, New England Journal of Medicine, and JAMA. He has also published multiple books and chapters including his book Stress and Addiction: Biological and Psychological Mechanisms, published by Elsevier Academic Press and considered an important reference in clinical research. The introduction was written by George Koob of the Scripps Research Institute, who also published a complementary volume on preclinical research on the same theme. al’Absi has also published the book Neuroscience of Pain, Stress, and Emotion (Elsevier/Academic Press). He has guest-edited special issues for Psychosomatic Medicine, Biological Psychology, and Journal of Neural Transmission, and served as associate editor for Psychophysiology and Biological Psychology. His research program has been funded by the National Institutes of Health, National Institute on Drug Abuse, the National Cancer Institute, the National Heart, Lung, and Blood Institute, the American Heart Association, National Science Foundation, and the John E. Fogarty International Center.

== Stress Dysregulation in Addiction Vulnerability and Relapse ==
The role of psychological stress in all stages of the addiction cycle is an important clinical concern, and defining mechanisms of this link has been an important scientific priority. al’Absi’s work was the first to identify the now-replicated demonstration that individuals with nicotine addiction show a distinctive pattern of basal hypercortisolism coupled with blunted acute stress responses, a dysregulation profile that predicts early relapse across multiple substances. His prospective studies showed that attenuated ACTH and cortisol responses to psychological stressors, as well as elevated cortisol during early abstinence, forecast smoking relapse within weeks. His contributions to the 2015 New England Journal of Medicine randomized trial of reduced-nicotine cigarettes provided evidence that lowering nicotine content reduces dependence and cigarette consumption, influencing FDA regulatory policy on tobacco products. His program also elucidated the role of endogenous opioids and cannabinoid systems in modulating stress-related craving and withdrawal, establishing stress dysregulation as a transdiagnostic target for addiction treatment.

== Pain and Stress Interactions ==
al’Absi’s research on stress and pain examines the interplay between psychological states such as anxiety and physiological pain processing, with implications for chronic pain management and gender differences in stress responses. In his early studies, he challenged traditional views by showing that anxiety can enhance pain endurance under certain conditions, reshaping understanding of cognitive–behavioral approaches to stress and pain. Building on this, al'Absi examined how acute stress induces analgesia through opioid-mediated pathways, with modality-specific effects (e.g., greater thermal but not mechanical pain relief) linked to hypothalamic-pituitary-adrenocortical (HPA) axis activation and endogenous opioids. Cardiovascular factors emerge as key mediators, where blood pressure, but not cortisol, modifies stress-modulated pain, and baroreceptor stimulation in hypertensives correlates with reduced nociception. Additional studies demonstrated sex-specific hormonal predictors of pain sensitivity.

In addiction contexts, chronic nicotine dependence dysregulates these systems, blunting stress-induced analgesia and heightening withdrawal-related pain, while opioid blockade unmasks adrenocortical hypersensitivity to pain cues, underscoring shared pathways between substance use and pain modulation. Research in this area has also distinguished subjective pain catastrophizing from objective measures of nociception.

== Stress, Addiction and Appetite Regulation ==
The connection between stress and appetitive behaviors has also been a topic of interest, considering the nexus of stress, addiction, and reward pathways in the brain. al’Absi’s research has examined how substance withdrawal alters appetite hormones, exacerbating craving and relapse vulnerability, particularly in tobacco dependence, where post-cessation weight gain serves as a major barrier to sustained abstinence. His studies demonstrate that acute stress elevates leptin levels, an adiposity signal that suppresses appetite but paradoxically heightens cigarette craving in abstinent smokers. Prospective examinations have subsequently linked changes in leptin and orexin during early withdrawal to increased urge intensity and shorter abstinence durations. Complementing this, al'Absi identified peptide YY (PYY), a satiety-promoting hormone, as a protective factor that buffers craving in the initial 24 hours of cessation, while elevated ghrelin, an orexigenic hormone amplified by stress, predicts heightened distress and early lapse. These findings reveal bidirectional stress–appetite pathways that amplify reward-seeking behaviors shared between food and nicotine. Integrating early life adversity as a moderator, his work further shows that trauma-exposed individuals exhibit blunted PYY and ghrelin responses during withdrawal, informing targeted interventions such as hormone-modulating therapies to enhance cessation outcomes.

== Stress Psychophysiology and Cardiovascular Health ==
This area explores how psychological stressors trigger cardiovascular, hormonal, and emotional responses. al’Absi’s research established stress response dysregulation as a biobehavioral marker of cardiovascular disease, with exaggerated cardiovascular and hormonal responses to acute stressors—combined with stress-induced hypoalgesia—functioning as an intermediate endophenotype predicting hypertension risk and structural cardiac changes such as left ventricular hypertrophy. One of his early papers detailed how acute stress elicits rapid changes in heart rate, blood pressure, and cortisol, influencing models of stress reactivity in clinical populations. This line of research has also focused on better characterizing stress response dynamics, including bidirectional links between cortisol fluctuations and mood states, advancing understanding of emotion–stress feedback loops in daily life.

== Real-Time Stress and Craving Assessment ==
al’Absi’s work on developing wearable and sensor-based tools for real-time stress monitoring in naturalistic settings, integrating machine learning with psychophysiology, has enabled continuous assessment of these processes. His research has focused on systems that continuously measure physiological markers (ECG, respiration, electrodermal activity) in naturalistic environments to detect stress and craving episodes with high temporal precision. One paper introduced algorithms for inferring stress from physiological signals, improving ambulatory monitoring accuracy. This work contributed to the development and validation of protocols for mobile stress-assessment applications. Funded by NSF Smart Health awards and integrated into multiple NIDA and NIDDK grants, this technology aims to enable just-in-time adaptive interventions (JITAI) by identifying the specific moments when stress triggers lapse.

== Global Health and Khat Research Program ==
al'Absi's program in behavioral medicine and addiction research has also extended to global work and collaborations. He has focused on capacity-building initiatives and evidence-based policy advocacy, particularly in underserved regions of Africa and the Middle East. As the Director of the Duluth Global Health Research Institute (DGHRI) at the University of Minnesota, he oversees programs integrating neuroscience, epidemiology, and public health to address stress-related disorders worldwide. He is the Principal Investigator (PI) and Director of the Khat Research Program (KRP), an initially NIDA and FIC funded consortium established in 2006 that includes researchers from the United States, Germany, Ethiopia, Kenya, and Yemen to investigate the neurobehavioral impacts of khat, a prevalent psychostimulant linked to psychiatric and cardiovascular risks. The KRP has produced over 60 publications and trained dozens of early-career scientists in low-resource settings. al'Absi also co-founded and currently presides over the Africa & Middle East Congress on Addiction (AMECA), a platform launched in 2014 to convene policymakers, clinicians, and academics across the region. AMECA has organized training workshops and conferences in cities such as Rabat, Cape Town, Tunis, Jimma, Gaborone, and Mombasa, advancing regional dialogue on substance use, trauma, and mental health comorbidities.

al’Absi participated in the Brain Disorders Across the Lifespan program, an NIH initiative that funded his research on brain health around the world. As part of this effort, he co-authored a review paper published in Nature in 2015. His broader global footprint also includes serving as Vice-President of the World Association for Stress Related and Anxiety Disorders (WASAD), as a member of the UNODC–WHO Informal Scientific Network (ISN), and co-organizing multiple International Brain Research Organization (IBRO) neuroscience schools and workshops in Africa.

== Awards and Honors ==
Over the course of his career, al’Absi has been recognized with numerous honors, including the Neal E. Miller Young Investigator Award from the Academy for Behavioral Medicine Research and the Herbert Weiner Early Career Award from the Society for Biopsychosocial Science and Medicine. He also received the 2016 Excellence Award from the National Institute on Drug Abuse. He was named a Fellow of the American Psychosomatic Society (Society for Biopsychosocial Science and Medicine). In 2022, he received the Hans Selye Inaugural Speakership at the University of Vienna for the World Association for Stress and Anxiety Disorders (WASAD) Congress. In 2018, he was elected a Fellow of the Society for Research on Nicotine and Tobacco (Society for Research on Nicotine and Tobacco). He was also named a Fellow of the Association for Psychological Science (Association for Psychological Science). He was also selected as a Fellow of the John D. and Catherine T. MacArthur Foundation Mind–Body Network. Additional honors include the Outstanding Graduate Academic Achievement Award (1995), Alpha Epsilon Lambda–Delta Chapter distinction (1995), the Outstanding Clinical/Applied Research Award from the University of Oklahoma (1993), the Thomas Jefferson Fellowship (1991–1994), and the Fulbright Fellowship (Fulbright Program).
