= Lester W. Sontag =

Lester W. Sontag (1901-1991) was Antioch College's physician and medical researcher. He was best known for his work in physiology, psychosomatic medicine, and the effects of stress on the human body.

He was appointed the first director of the Fels Longitudinal Study in 1929 and remained active in the study until his retirement in 1970.

Sontag helped legitimize the idea that mental states could produce measurable physiological changes, contributing to what later became behavioral medicine. In the 1940s while studying unborn fetuses of women who had soldier husbands fighting in WWII, Sontag discovered that the mother's heartbeat affected the heartbeat her infant. He named this phenomenon "somatopsychics," and theorized that the mother's fears could heighten the child's susceptibility to emotional distress. He described his ideas in "Implications of Fetal Behavior and Environment for Adult Personalities."
