= Drug abuse in Tanzania =

Drug abuse is a major and a growing problem in Tanzania. In 2011, the drug control commission (which is dealing with drug abuse issues) reported that the number of people who are addicted ranges from 150,000 and 500,000. The National guideline for comprehensive package of HIV interventions for key and vulnerable populations in Tanzania estimates that there are 25,000 to 50,000 people who inject drugs in Tanzania in 2017 which contribute to the unending burden of HIV in the country. Most of the people who are involved in drug abuse in Tanzania are youths, who often engage in trafficking and consuming illegal drugs like cannabis and, they are mostly found in major cities of the country. The common illegal drugs in Tanzania are cannabis which remains widely used followed by heroin, khat, cocaine, marijuana and to a lesser extent inhalants such as petrol, glue and paints.

== Background ==
Illegal drugs are available in Tanzania due to the transmission of drugs across the country borders to the nearby countries like Zambia, Malawi, Burundi, and Rwanda. Cultivation of drugs like cannabis, in some of the regions such as Arusha, Tanga, and Mara has also contributed to an increasing use of cannabis in such regions. The government decided to destroy all the plantation and imposed legal measures to people who were engaging in such activities of cultivating illegal drugs. The government established a Drug Control Commission in 1977 to deal with prevention of drug abuse and trafficking and in 2017, the Drug Control and Enforcement Authority (DCEA) was launched to coordinate activities related to drug supply reduction, demand reduction and harm reduction. It also provides opportunities for Non-Governmental Organizations to help in preventing drug abuse in the community.

== Causes ==
The major cause of drug abuse in Tanzania is easy accessibility and availability of drug abuse among regions of the country. The accessibility and availability of illicit drugs is also attributed by the improvement in transport infrastructures and urbanization together with poverty and inequalities.

== Treatment ==
In Tanzania, there are numbers of sober house centers in different regions, which provide treatment and consultation to drug addicts. They receive a number of people who are addicted and live with them for a certain period of time, depends on how one is affected. Medically Assisted Therapy (MAT) which is also referred to as opioid agonist therapy (OAT) or opioid substitution therapy (OST) is an important treatment available for people with opioid addiction such as heroin. In Tanzania, it was started in 2011 and currently the country has clinics in about 11 health facilities. MAT is orally administered daily under direct observation and supervision of trained health care providers. On the other hand, the government (through the ministry of health) provides support to the hospitals and sober houses. For instance, Muhimbili National hospital, Temeke and Mwananyamala regional referral hospital in Dar es Salaam provide Medically Assisted Therapy (MAT) - methadone as a treatment for opioid addiction.

Other services for drug use include health information and education, screening for other diseases such as HIV, Sexually Transmitted Diseases (STDs) and hepatitis. Such services are provided by health facilities, Non-Governmental Organizations and community-based organizations.

== Sources ==
Masibo, Racheal (2013). "An assessment of knowledge, attitudes, and practices of psychoactive substance use among secondary school students in Dodoma Municipality, Tanzania".

Rebecca, Magabe (2013). "ASSESSMENT OF COMMUNITY INVOLVEMENT IN PREVENTION OF DRUG ABUSE AMONG YOUTH IN TANZANIA".
