= Bioenergy economy-based health improvement =

Bioenergy Economy-based Health Improvement (BEHI) is an integrative, evidence-based care approach designed to promote health and the sustainable development of happiness. Instead of focusing on pathogenesis and treatment, this psychosomatic health program emphasizes salutogenesis and the consciousness evolution. The name is derived from the ancient and common Persian word behi, meaning "to become better" or "to be better". Bioenergy Economy-based Health Improvement focuses on the timeliness and alignment of psychophysical energy investments to maximize functionality and fulfillment. This health-oriented method promotes the expansion of bodily awareness and mind-body integration by exploring the coordination of physical, emotional, cognitive, and behavioral energy investments in every physical, symbolic, and interpersonal context.

== Introduction ==
This systems-thinking approach was first introduced as "Bioenergy Economy" by Farzad Goli—a researcher, author, and medical psychotherapist—with an initial emphasis on its biophysical and integrative aspects. Following clinical and educational research, this consciousness-based, salutogenic method was gradually renamed BEHI and developed into a transdiagnostic, evidence-based care system.

The BEHI model integrates body-centered, psychodynamic, existential, and consciousness-based psychological approaches within a biosemiotic framework, establishing the embodied mind and the conscious body as the foundation for understanding life and healthcare. The model also utilizes the free energy principle, introduced by Karl Friston, as the basis for its economic model. From this perspective, the human body is viewed as a complex network of meaning-making systems in which mutual information flows in the form of material, energetic, symbolic, and reflective signs. The Bioenergy Economy-based Health Improvement approach focuses on minimizing the level of free energy and resulting psychosomatic conditions through mindful contextual changes in the body, narrative, relationship, and intention.

== Main concepts ==
The BEHI approach focuses on directing energy-information across four fields of the bioenergy economy. In each of the following four fields, bodily awareness exercises, cognitive behavioral interventions, and interpersonal skills are applied:

- Body Economy: Releasing dysfunctional muscular tensions and developing body awareness by enhancing coordination in the interoceptive, proprioceptive, and exteroceptive systems.
- Narrative Economy: Organizing the flow of energy-information in autobiographical memory using techniques such as attentional flexibility, bioenergetic reprocessing, and centering in the body, and non-dualistic narrative.
- Relation Economy: Regulating interpersonal energy investments and facilitating synergy by developing intercorporeal awareness, mindful control of distance, angle, and proportion, and using nonviolent communication.
- Intention Economy: Harmonizing will and desire by developing nonlocal body awareness, willing with wholeness, and aligning bodily, symbolic, and relational energy investments.

== Levels of bioenergy economy ==
From the BEHI perspective, our energy investments to meet needs and achieve greater happiness and satisfaction are possible on four levels of the bioenergy economy. Bioenergy Economy-based Health Improvement focuses on developing the capacities of body awareness and cognitive-behavioral skills to guide energy-information from the more limited Releasing and Cumulative levels to the higher and more sustainable Proactive and Agapistic levels. In this psychosomatic approach, the Releasing and Cumulative levels are respectively equivalent to Freud's pleasure principle and reality principle. The Active level is equivalent to Viktor Frankl's concept of freedom of meaning-making and Abraham Maslow's notion of self-actualization. The Agapistic level refers to agapism in Charles Sanders Peirce's semiotic theory —the evolutionary force that the whole exerts on its parts—and is equivalent to the transpersonal self of consciousness in transpersonal psychology. In the BEHI model, all these levels of values and methods of energy investment for fulfillment are explained by a single organismic value: hedonism. In Bioenergy Economy-based Health Improvement, this drive is used in an extended sense. It implies emergent properties at each level of human organization, progressing from earlier (Releasing) and more (Cumulative) pleasure to more sustainable (Protective) and unconditional (Agapistic) pleasure.

The levels of the bioenergy economy can be summarized as follows:

- Releasing Level (will-to-pleasure): Focuses on the immediate release of tensions and sooner pleasure.
- Cumulative Level (will-to-power): Delays immediate pleasures to achieve long-term satisfaction and more pleasure over time.
- Proactive Level (will-to-meaning): Creates new resources and meanings for sustainable pleasure by autogenic synthesis of pleasure.
- Agapistic Level (will-to-being): Achieves unconditional happiness through the expansion of the self and a non-dual identity.

== Effectiveness ==
Clinical and experimental studies have shown that BEHI is efficacious in improving mood and reducing anxiety. It has demonstrated therapeutic effects for disorders such as migraine, myofascial pain, irritable bowel syndrome, and inflammatory bowel disease. It has also been shown to be effective in the rehabilitation of patients with breast cancer and in the rehabilitation of those recovering from cardiac and respiratory conditions. Furthermore, this psychosomatic health program has been successful in promoting weight loss in people with overweight and obesity, improving employee distress and quality of life. and enhancing educational performance.
