= Psychosomatic Medicine (journal) =

Medical journal

- Discipline: Psychosomatic medicine
- Language: English
- Edited by: Willem J. Kop

Publication details
- History: 1939–present
- Publisher: Lippincott Williams & Wilkins on behalf of the American Psychosomatic Society (United States)
- Frequency: 9/year
- Open access: After two years
- Impact factor: 4.312 (2020)

Standard abbreviations
- ISO 4: Psychosom. Med.

Indexing
- CODEN: PSMEAP
- ISSN: 0033-3174 (print); 1534-7796 (web)
- LCCN: 41002597
- OCLC no.: 1534-7796

Links
- Journal homepage; Online access; Online archive

Psychosomatic Medicine is a peer-reviewed medical journal published nine times per year by the American Psychosomatic Society. It covers all aspects of psychosomatic medicine. It was established in 1939. According to the Journal Citation Reports, the journal has a 2020 impact factor of 4.312.

== See also ==
- List of psychiatry journals
