= Michael S. Okun =

American neurologist

- Born: July 5, 1971 (age 55)

Academic background
- Education: Florida State University (B.S.) University of Florida (M.D., Residency) Emory University (Fellowship)

Academic work
- Institutions: University of Florida

Michael S. Okun (born July 5, 1971) is an American neurologist, neuroscientist, and author who serves as the co-founder and director of the Norman Fixel Institute for Neurological Diseases at University of Florida Health. Additionally, he is the former chair of the Department of Neurology at the University of Florida and the current Medical Director/Advisor for the Parkinson's Foundation. He is the fifth person at the University's College of Medicine to hold the rank of Distinguished Professor.

== Education and career ==
Okun received a Bachelor of Arts degree in history from Florida State University in 1993 and earned his Doctor of Medicine with honors from the University of Florida College of Medicine in 1996.

He completed a neurology residency at the University of Florida, where he served as chief resident, and subsequently pursued fellowship training in movement disorders at Emory University under the neurologists Mahlon DeLong and Jerrold Vitek.

In 2002, Okun co-founded the University of Florida Movement Disorders Program with neurosurgeon Kelly Foote, which aimed to integrate clinical care with research and innovation in deep brain stimulation (DBS). The program expanded over time and in 2019 was renamed the Norman Fixel Institute for Neurological Diseases following a $20 million philanthropic gift.

== Scientific Contributions and Research ==
=== Tourette syndrome and Neurophysiology ===
Okun opened his laboratory in 2002 at the McKnight Brain Institute on the University of Florida Campus. The laboratory focused on uncovering the underpinnings of human tic in Tourette syndrome and exploring non-motor basal ganglia circuitry in Parkinson’s disease, Tourette, dystonia, OCD, and tremor. The laboratory aimed to innovate neuromodulation and circuit-based treatments for multiple neurological and neuropsychiatric diseases. His laboratory is known for studying basal ganglia circuitry and neuromodulation therapies.

Okun recognized that some diseases lacked animal models that would recapitulate the human condition(s). He advocated and implemented a neuroethics-based approach to utilize the operating room and outpatient clinic setting for research into these neurological conditions. The Okun laboratory originally focused on Tourette syndrome due to the paroxysmal nature of human tics, which made it ideal to explore the physiological underpinnings of the movement disorder. His work has been important in understanding the biological changes underpinning neural network oscillation, which underpin the symptomatic benefits of deep brain stimulation, and for moving toward symptom and circuit-based treatments rather than disease-based treatments. Okun has trained over 70 clinical MD fellows and many researchers in basal ganglia and related disorders.

Okun, neurosurgeon Kelly Foote, and neuroscientist Gunduz were featured on an episode of Vital Signs with CNN's Sanjay Gupta, who scrubbed in to the operating room with the team and explored their approach to innovating new therapies for Tourette syndrome.

Okun's lab studies tic physiology and symptom-specific treatments, leading to the development of closed-loop DBS approaches. He founded a global DBS registry for Tourette syndrome, funded by the Tourette Association of America. With funding from the National Institutes of Health and philanthropic foundations, Okun and the University of Florida based group conducted a series experiments between 2004 and 2022, resulting in the successful characterization of human tic physiology.

=== Parkinson's pandemic ===
The expression "Parkinson's pandemic" has been used to describe the rapid and global rise in cases of Parkinson’s disease, which is now considered the world’s fastest-growing neurological disorder. Okun used this term in his 2013 book Parkinson’s Treatment: 10 Secrets to a Happier Life, where he highlighted the increasing prevalence and public health implications of the disease.

In the book Ending Parkinson’s Disease, the authors emphasized that the "pandemic" nature of Parkinson’s is not due to infectious transmission, but rather to global trends including aging populations, industrialization, and environmental risk factors such as pesticide exposure. The Global Burden of Disease Study 2016 shared Okun's observations.

=== Parkinson’s Disease and Deep Brain Stimulation ===
Okun designed and carried out one of the first large prospective randomized Parkinson’s disease trials comparing the two most common DBS brain targets. The study, known as the NIH COMPARE trial, revealed unilateral STN or GPi DBS resulted in similar motor benefits; however, there were important advantages and disadvantages to using each brain target. His work was particularly important for highlighting the most common cognitive side effect of deep-brain stimulation and later explaining its mechanism.

=== Parkinson’s care models ===
In 2002, upon joining the University of Florida, he co-developed with neurosurgeon Kelly D. Foote the conceptual model known as the patient is the sun, which positioned the person with Parkinson’s at the center of an interdisciplinary team of caregivers and specialists.

Building on the initial framework, Okun and colleagues created the UF INFORM database, an integrated clinical and research registry, which facilitated outcome tracking and informed refinements to care delivery.

The approach was further formalized in the Service and Science Model of Care, published in JAMA Neurology, which emphasized the integration of evidence-based medicine, multidisciplinary care coordination, and translational research. Most recently, the model has been expanded and renamed the Parkinson’s Universe Model of Care, a framework that conceptualizes care as an interconnected system with the patient at its center, surrounded by caregivers, healthcare professionals, technology, advocacy, and societal supports.

== Awards ==
Okun has been recognized as the top clinical researcher at the University of Florida College of Medicine (2021). He received The Lifetime Achievement Award from the University of Florida, The Tom Issacs International Parkinson's Disease Researcher Award, and was also recognized in a 2015 White House ceremony by the Obama administration as a Champion of Change for Parkinson's Disease.

In 2023, he was awarded the rank of Distinguished Professor at the University of Florida.

== Writings ==
Okun's first book as an author was Lessons from the Bedside which this was published in 1995 as a book of prose and poetry which chronicled the medical school experience. He was interviewed for the PBS series Healing Words (2008) which focused on poetry in medicine.

He has published on the ethics of broadcasting brain surgeries and access issues surrounding off-label device use. He co-founded the annual Deep Brain Stimulation Think Tank to promote collaboration and ethical discussion in neuromodulation. In his TED Talk, Okun discussed the ethical implications of neuromodulation and the responsibilities of brain scientists, emphasizing the concept that "your brain controls everything, and we can control your brain." The think tank has released annual proceedings and influenced neuromodulation policy and practice.

Okun has been published in the New England Journal of Medicine, Lancet, and the Journal of the American Medical Association. He has authored and co-authored numerous books and research articles.

His 2025 book The Parkinson’s Plan: A New Path to Prevention and Treatment appeared on The New York Times Best Seller list in the Advice, How-To & Miscellaneous category.

=== Selected publications ===
- Okun, Michael S. (2013). Parkinson's treatment : the 10 secrets to a happier life (English ed.). [United States]: [CreateSpace]. ISBN 978-1-4818-5499-3. OCLC 842155662 was translated into over 20 languages and it was the first to propose the idea of a coming "Parkinson's pandemic."
- Dorsey, Ray (2020). Ending Parkinson's disease : a prescription for action. Todd Sherer, Michael S. Okun, Bastiaan R. Bloem (First ed.). New York. ISBN 978-1-5417-2452-5. OCLC 1108524282. which was co-authored by Ray Dorsey, Todd Scherer and Bastiaan Bloem, Okun introduced the idea of a PACT to end Parkinson's disease (Prevent, Advocate, Care, develop Treatments).
- Pringsheim T, Holler-Managan Y, Okun MS, et al. (May 2019). "Comprehensive systematic review summary: Treatment of tics in people with Tourette syndrome and chronic tic disorders". Neurology (Review). 92 (19): 907–915. doi:10.1212/WNL.0000000000007467. PMC 6537130. PMID 31061209.
- Okun, Michael S.; Dorsey, Ray (2025). The Parkinson’s Plan: A New Path to Prevention and Treatment. New York: PublicAffairs. ISBN 9781541705388.
