= Society for Biopsychosocial Science and Medicine =

Organization for psychosomatic medicine

- Formation: 1942
- Headquarters: 6728 Old McLean Village Drive; McLean, Virginia, U.S.
- President: Peter Gianaros
- Website: psychosomatic.org

The Society for Biopsychosocial Science and Medicine (formerly the American Psychosomatic Society) is a scientific organization that integrates "mind, brain, body, and social context in medicine."

== History ==
Founded in 1942 as the American Psychosomatic Society, its mission is to advance and integrate the scientific study of biological, psychological, behavioral and social factors in health and disease. It has been called "one of the oldest and probably the most influential scientific society in psychosomatic/biopsychosocial research worldwide."

=== Journal ===
The organization publishes the journal Psychosomatic Medicine since 1939, three years before the organization formally incorporated. The journal has been called "the foremost in the field."
