= Hélène Michel-Wolfromm =

French gynecologist

Hélène Michel-Wolfromm was a French gynecologist known for her work on the sexual problems encountered by French women.

== Early life and education ==
Michel-Wolfromm was born in Paris on December 4, 1914, and died on April 5, 1969 from lung cancer. She studied medicine with a focus in gynecology in Paris and graduated in 1938. Michel-Wolfromm was the first in France to apply psychosomatic medicine to the field of gynecology. She focused on sexology and a psychosomatic approach to gynecological problems. She also spoke with the press about sexual problems experienced by women. She talked about sexuality as 'that thing' when talking to her patients, and considered female mental instability a fear of aging. The female patients she saw were referred to her by other doctors who no longer wished to treat them. In her later years she defended the right of women to obtain birth control.

After her death in 1969, an obituary by Raoul Palmer was published in Gynécologie et Obstétrique, and second obituary appeared in La Presse Médicale.

== Selected publications ==
- Michel-Wolfromm, Hélène (1 January 1972). Cette chose-là (in French) (Le Livre de Poche ed.). Bernard Grasset.
- Michel-Wolfromm, Helene (1968-06-01). "The psychological factor in spontaneous abortion". Journal of Psychosomatic Research. 12 (1): 67–71. doi:10.1016/0022-3999(68)90010-X. ISSN 0022-3999. PMID 5663947.
- Michel-Wolfromm, H. (1966). "[Acceptability of the methods of contraception]". Marseille Médical. 103 (10): 691–694. ISSN 0025-4053. PMID 5959756.
- Michel-Wolfromm, Hélêne (1969). "Les troubles sexuels de la femme". Gynecologic and Obstetric Investigation. 167 (2): 91–99. doi:10.1159/000302167. ISSN 0378-7346.
- Michel-Wolfromm, Helene (1964). Gynécologie psychosomatique (in French). Paris VI: Masson et Cie. OCLC 1024703426.
