= Society of Neuroscientists of Africa =

Professional body in Africa

The Society of Neuroscientists of Africa (SONA) is a non-profit organisation registered in Nairobi, Kenya, which acts as the umbrella organisation for different neuroscience groups and societies in Africa. They organise the bi-annual SONA conference. The current president of the society is Prof. James Olukayode Olopade.

== History ==
SONA was founded in 1993 by James Kimani. The goal of the society is to promote neuroscience research and teaching in Africa. In its history the society has organised 14 international meetings in Africa, of which the first was organized in 1993.

== Conferences ==
- 1993 - Nairobi, Kenya
- 1995 - Marrakech, Morocco
- 1997 - Cape Town, South Africa
- 1999 - Dakar, Senegal
- 2001 - Nairobi, Kenya
- 2003 - Abuja, Nigeria
- 2005 - Cape Town, South Africa
- 2007 - Kinshasa, Democratic Republic of Congo
- 2009 - Faiyum, Egypt
- 2011 - Addis Ababa, Ethiopia
- 2013 - Rabat, Morocco
- 2015 - Durban, South Africa
- 2017 - Entebbe, Uganda
- 2019 - Lagos, Nigeria
