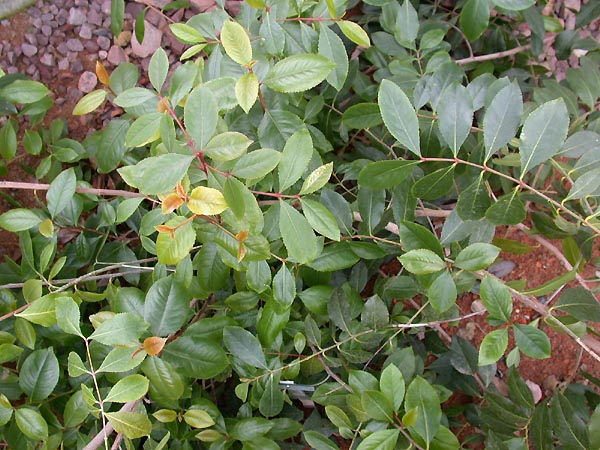
- Catha edulis

Conservation status
- Least Concern (IUCN 3.1)

Scientific classification
- Kingdom: Plantae
- Clade: Tracheophytes
- Clade: Angiosperms
- Clade: Eudicots
- Clade: Rosids
- Order: Celastrales
- Family: Celastraceae
- Genus: Catha; Forssk. ex Scop.
- Species: C. edulis

Binomial name
- Catha edulis (Vahl) Forssk. ex Endl.

Synonyms
- genus synonyms: Dillonia Sacleux; Methyscophyllum Eckl. & Zeyh.; Trigonotheca Hochst.; species synonyms: Catha forskalii A.Rich.; Catha glauca (Eckl. & Zeyh.) A.Chev.; Catha inermis J.F.Gmel.; Celastrus edulis Vahl (1790) (basionym; Celastrus tsaad Ferreira & Galeotti ex Walp.; Dillonia abyssinica Sacleux; Hartogia thea E.Mey.; Methyscophyllum glaucum Eckl. & Zeyh.; Trigonotheca serrata Hochst.

= Khat =

Psychoactive species of plant

Khat or qat (Catha edulis), also known as Bushman's tea in South Africa, is a species of flowering plant in the family Celastraceae, and the sole species in the genus Catha. It is a shrub or tree native to eastern and southern Africa, ranging from Ethiopia and South Sudan to Angola and the Cape Provinces of South Africa. It grows in montane riverine and evergreen forests from 1,100 to 2,400 metres (3600 to 7900 feet) elevation.

It has a history of cultivation originating in the Harar region of Ethiopia, and it was subsequently introduced at different times to countries nearby in East Africa and South Arabia, notably Somalia, Yemen and South Saudi Arabia . Cultivated by farmers, its leaves are sold on the market to be chewed as a recreational stimulant. The world's largest consumers are East Africans, particularly Somalis, nearby Yemen and Saudi Arabia , with the largest producers/exporters being Ethiopia and Kenya.

Khat contains the alkaloid cathinone, a stimulant which causes greater sociability, excitement, mild loss of appetite and mild euphoria. Among communities from the areas where the plant is native, khat-chewing has historical relevance (as a social custom, especially among men) dating back thousands of years, analogous—but slightly different—to the use of coca leaves in South America's Andes Mountains or the betel nut preparations in South Asia.

Since 1980, the World Health Organization (WHO) classifies khat as a "drug of abuse" that can produce psychological dependence, although the WHO does not consider khat addiction to be a serious global problem.

The legality of khat varies by region and country; in many territories, khat might pass "under-the-radar" as a botanical species (thus not be a specifically controlled substance), but its recreational use may, nevertheless, be illegal under more general laws.

It is strictly a controlled substance in many regions, often at the highest degree, including in Australia, Canada, the European Union, India, Jordan, New Zealand, Saudi Arabia, the United Arab Emirates and the United Kingdom. In the United States and Turkey, the botanical specimen (plant) Catha edulis is not prohibited, but the consumption and distribution of harvested leaves or possession for recreational use are illegal. In the UAE, the punishment for possession, use, or distribution of khat can include life imprisonment.

By contrast, its production, sale, and consumption are all fully legal—or not mentioned in a legal context at all—in the nations where its use is culturally significant, including Djibouti, Ethiopia, Kenya, Somalia, Uganda and Yemen. In Israel, which hosts a population of Yemenite Jews and Ethiopian Jews, only the consumption of the plant's leaves in its natural state is permitted; "khat extracts" are illegal, after they became a street drug and were popularly abused in the 2000s.

== Terminology ==
The genus name Catha is a Latinization of the Arabic name قات, which is regularly romanized as qāt. Other romanizations include kat, quatt, qaad, qhat, ghat, and chat.

The khat plant is known by a variety of names, such as qat and gat in Yemeni Arabic, qaat and jaad in Somali, and chat (ጫት) in Harari and Amharic. It is also known as jimaa in the Oromo language, mayirungi in Luganda, and as miraa and muguka in Swahili. In the African Great Lakes region, where Catha edulis is (in some areas) cultivated, it is known as muguka, muhulo, miraa and muirungi. The Swahili words miraa and muguka are also the terms used in English in Kenya, where the former refers to a product including both stems and leaves, while the latter refers to a lower-grade product using only leaves taken from the tip of the stem.

It also goes by various descriptive names, such as Abyssinian tea, Arabian tea, kafta, jimaa, and Somali tea in its endemic regions of the Horn of Africa and the Arabian peninsula. In South Africa, the plant is known as Bushman's tea. The plant is also known as chat tree and flower of paradise.

In the Indian subcontinent, Catha edulis is sometimes referred to by its Unani name Kat or Qaat in traditional texts.

== Description ==
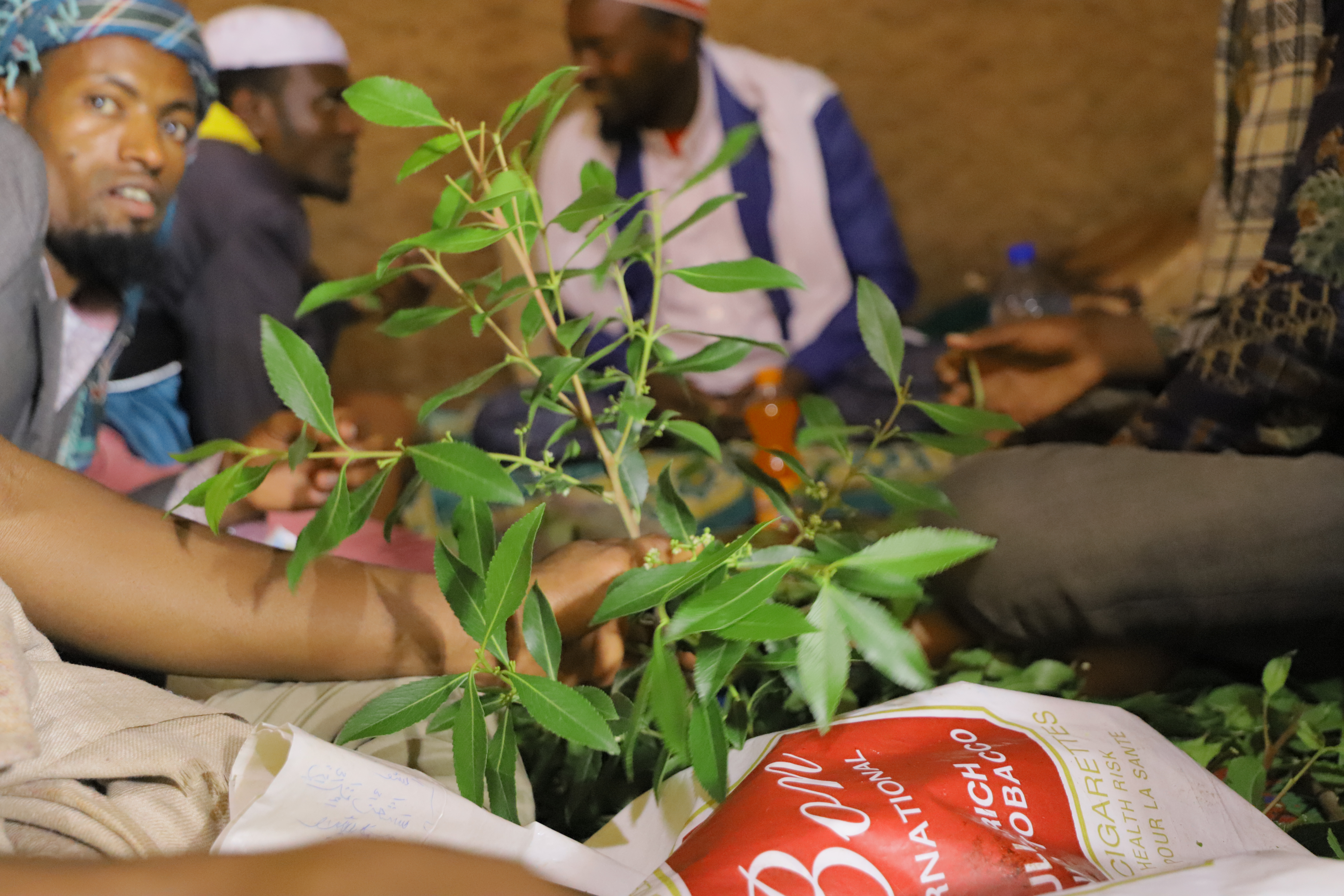
Khat leaves of Harar

Khat is a slow-growing shrub or tree that typically attains a height of 1–5 meters (3 feet 3 inches – 16 feet 5 inches). However, it can reach heights of up to 10 m (33 ft) in equatorial areas. The plant usually grows in arid environments, at a temperature range of 5–35 degrees Celsius (41–95 degrees Fahrenheit). It has evergreen leaves, which are 5–10 centimeters (2–4 inches) long and 1–4 cm (0.39–1.6 in) broad.

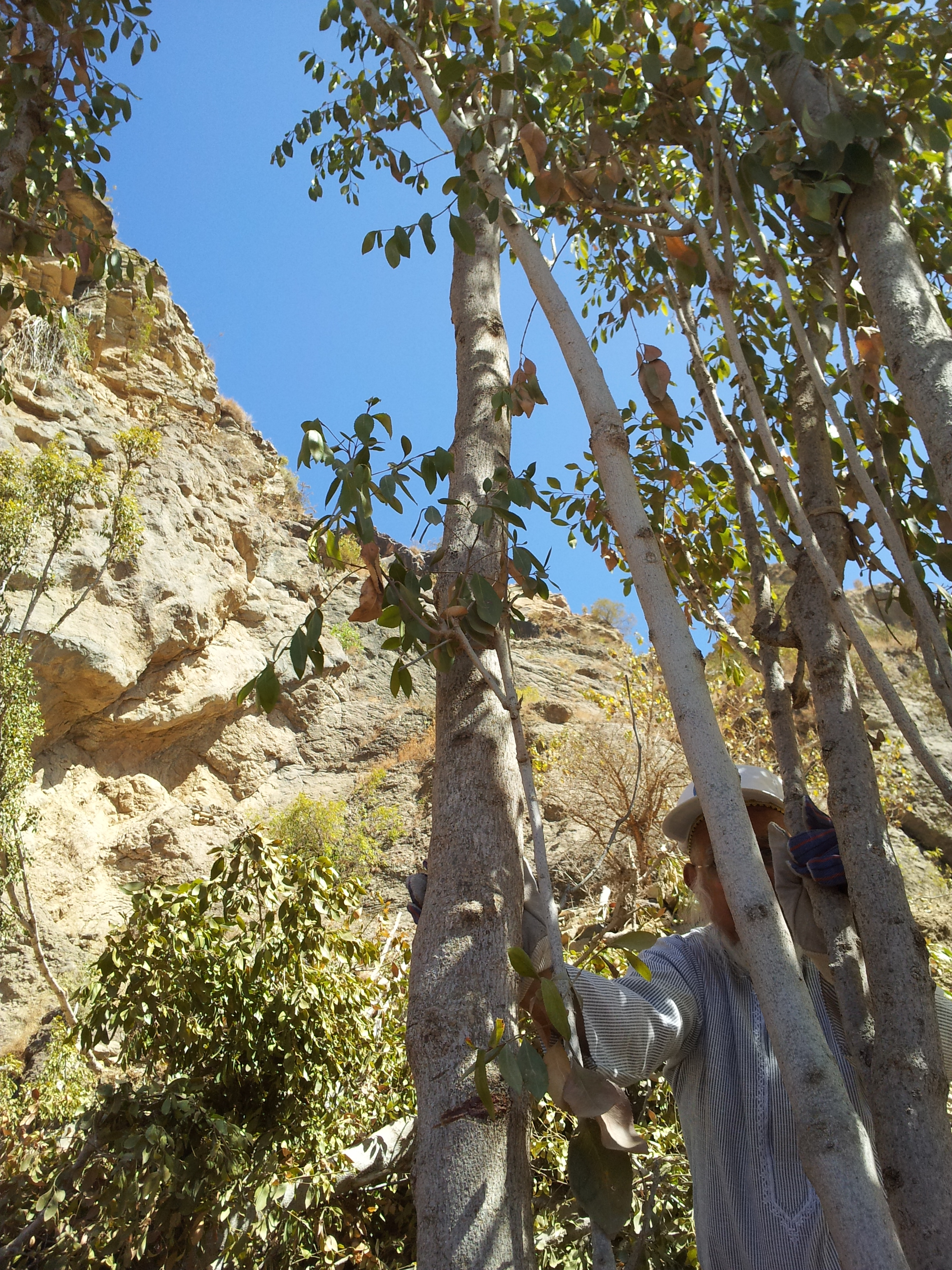
Qat tree, Yemen

It takes seven to eight years for the khat plant to reach its full height. Other than access to sun and water, khat requires little maintenance. Ground water is often pumped from deep wells by diesel engines to irrigate the crops, or brought in by water trucks. The plants are watered heavily starting around a month before they are harvested to make the leaves and stems soft and moist. A good khat plant can be harvested four times a year, providing a year-long source of income for the farmer.

The shrub's flowers are produced on short axillary cymes that are 4–8 cm (1.6–3.1 in) in length. Each flower is small, with five white petals.

The samara fruit is an oblong, three-valved capsule, which contains one to three seeds.

== Society and culture ==
=== Cultivation ===
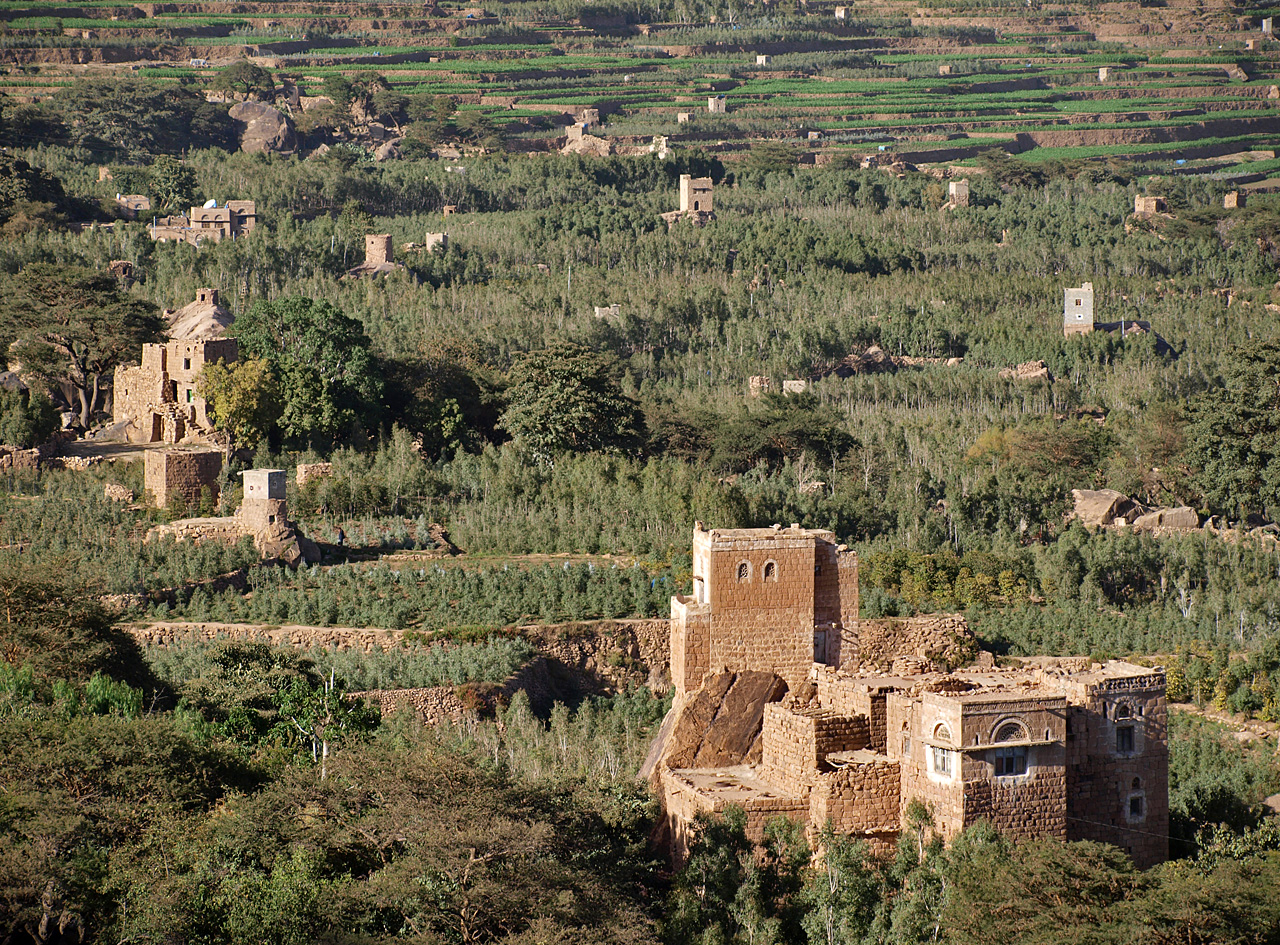
Khat cultivation in western Yemen near At Tawilah

Khat has been grown for use as a stimulant for centuries in the Horn of Africa and the Arabian Peninsula. There, chewing khat predates the use of coffee and is used in a similar social context. Its fresh leaves and tops are chewed or, less frequently, dried and consumed as tea, to achieve a state of euphoria and stimulation. The leaves or the soft part of the stem can be chewed with either chewing gum or fried peanuts to make it easier to chew.

In Uganda, it is grown in the central region, especially in Kasenge (Wakiso), Butambala District, Mabira Forest, and in some parts of the western region of the country. In Kenya, it is grown in Embu County and Meru County.

One reason for the widespread cultivation of khat in Yemen is the high income that it provides for farmers. Some studies done in 2001 estimated that the income from cultivating khat was about 2.5 million Yemeni rials per hectare (1 million per acre), while fruits brought only 0.57 million rials per hectare (0.23 million per acre). Between 1970 and 2000, the area on which khat was cultivated was estimated to have grown from 8,000 to 103,000 hectares (30 to 400 sq. mi.). In 2000, according to a World Bank estimate, khat accounted for 30% of Yemen's economy.

=== Uses ===
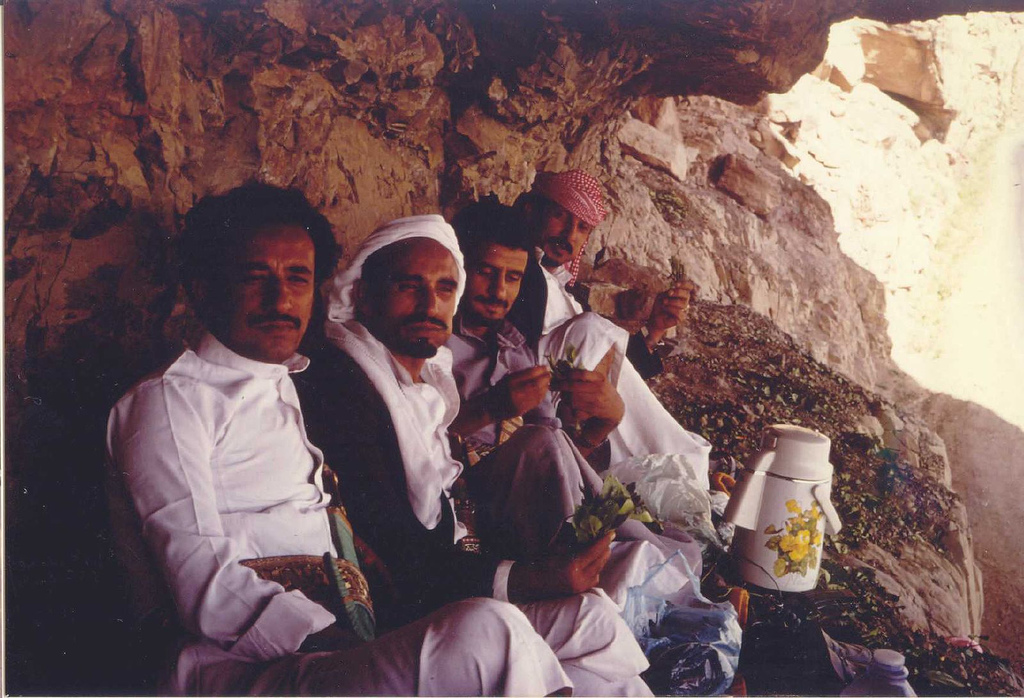
A khat picnic in Yemen

Although the practice of khat-chewing is still primarily restricted to its original area of cultivation in the Red Sea area, the khat plant is native to the whole of the eastern side of Africa from Kenya southwards to Tanzania, Malawi, Zambia, Zimbabwe, where it grows on rocky outcrops and around the fringes of woodlands. In southern Africa the shrub's range is scattered but still grows in the KwaZulu-Natal, Eastern Cape, Western Cape and Mpumalanga provinces of South Africa, in addition to Eswatini and Mozambique.

Traditionally, khat is used as a socialising drug as in Yemen, where khat-chewing is predominantly a male habit combined with conversation, hookah smoking, and tea drinking. Khat is so popular in Yemen that its cultivation consumes much of the country's agricultural resources. An estimated 40% of Yemen's water supply goes towards irrigating it, with production increasing by about 10% to 15% every year. One "daily bag" of khat requires an estimated 500 litres (130 US gal) of water to produce.

In countries outside the core area of growth and consumption, khat is sometimes chewed at parties or social functions. It may also be used by farmers and labourers for reducing physical fatigue or hunger, and by drivers and students for improving attention.

In 2018, General Taher al-Aqili, chief of staff of the Yemeni Armed Forces, said that khat is "our whisky" and that it "gives his men strength to fight." Reports indicate that child soldiers in Yemen have been chewing khat in order to remain alert on the battlefield.

=== Distribution ===
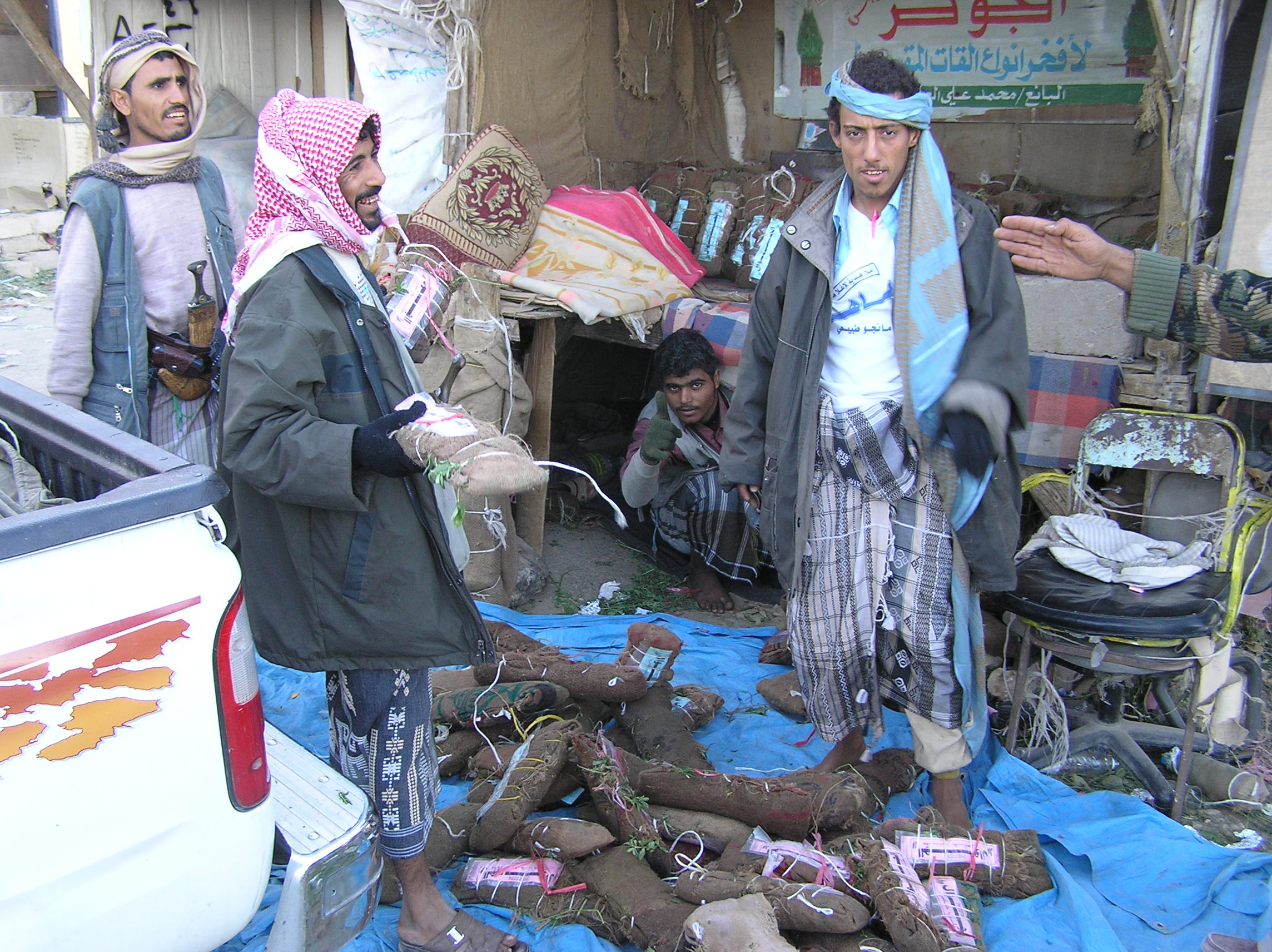
Qat merchants

In recent years, improved roads, off-road motor vehicles, and air transportation have increased the global distribution of this perishable commodity and, as a result, the plant has been found in places such as Australia, Netherlands, Canada, the United Kingdom, the Levant, Italy, New Zealand and the United States. In the US, freshly-packed khat leaves are sold in the African and Middle Eastern markets of Boston, Dallas, Los Angeles, and New York City, where the demand is highest.

== Effects ==
Table from the 2010 ISCD study ranking various drugs (legal and illegal) based on statements by drug-harm experts. Khat was found to be the 17th overall most dangerous drug.

Addiction experts in psychiatry, chemistry, pharmacology, forensic science, epidemiology, and the police and legal services engaged in delphic analysis regarding 20 popular recreational drugs. Khat was ranked 17th in dependence, 20th in physical harm, and 20th in social harm.

Medieval Mamluk historian al-Maqrizi describing Khat's effects states:

Jaat which does not bear fruit, but its leaves are eaten, and produce a sharpening of the intellect, an increase of memory, an exhilaration of the spirit, a lessening of appetite and sexual desire, and a disinclination to sleep.

Khat consumption induces mild euphoria and excitement, similar to that conferred by strong coffee. Individuals become very talkative under the influence of the plant. Animal testing has shown that khat causes an increase in motoric activity. The effects of oral administration of cathinone occur more rapidly than the effects of amphetamine pills; roughly 15 minutes as compared to 30 minutes in amphetamine. Khat can induce manic behaviours and hyperactivity, similar in effects to those produced by amphetamine.

The use of khat results in constipation. Dilated pupils (mydriasis) are prominent during khat consumption, reflecting the sympathomimetic effects of the drug, which are also reflected in increased heart rate and blood pressure. Long-term use can precipitate permanent tooth darkening (of a greenish tinge), susceptibility to ulcers, and diminished sex drive. Khat is an effective anorectic, causing loss of appetite.

It is unclear if the consumption of khat directly affects the mental health of the user or not. Occasionally, a psychotic episode can result, resembling a hypomanic state in presentation. In humans, its prolonged consumption creates an uplifted mood and a sense of release from time and space.

Khat is mainly chewed by men, but there are cases of its use by women, and in particular it has been associated with increased likelihood of adverse outcomes during pregnancy.

=== Effects by timeframe ===
Immediate

- alertness
- arousal
- concentration
- confidence
- constipation
- dilated pupils
- euphoria
- friendliness
- increased blood pressure
- increased heart rate
- insomnia
- mania
- psychosis
- suppressed appetite
- talkativeness
- thought disorder
- verbosity

Excess

- Poisoning and nausea

Long-term

- depression
- infrequent hallucinations
- impaired inhibition (similar to alcohol)
- increased risk of myocardial infarction (heart attack)
- oral cancer
- psychosis in extreme cases in the genetically predisposed
- weight loss

Indeterminate

- death
- stroke following acute coronary syndrome (clogging of the artery) (Note: either from impaired insight into symptoms by the khat chewer, delay to care, or poorly understood pathophysiological mechanisms)

== Chemistry and pharmacology ==
Cathinone structure

The stimulant effect of the plant was originally attributed to "katin", cathine, a phenethylamine-type substance isolated from the plant. However, the attribution was disputed by reports showing the plant extracts from fresh leaves contained another substance more behaviourally active than cathine. In 1975, the related alkaloid cathinone was isolated, and its absolute configuration, (S)-2-Amino-1-phenylpropan-1-one, was established in 1978. Cathinone is not very stable and breaks down to produce cathine and norephedrine. These chemicals belong to the PPA (phenylpropanolamine) family, a subset of the phenethylamines related to amphetamines and the catecholamines epinephrine and norepinephrine. In fact, cathinone and cathine have a very similar molecular structure to amphetamine. Khat is sometimes confused with methcathinone (also known as cat), a Schedule I substance that possesses a similar chemical structure to the khat plant's cathinone active component. However, both the side effects and the addictive properties of methcathinone are much stronger than those associated with khat use.

When khat leaves dry, the more potent chemical, cathinone, decomposes within 48 hours, leaving behind the milder chemical, cathine. Thus, harvesters transport khat by packaging the fresh leaves and stems in plastic bags or wrapping them in banana leaves to preserve their moisture and keep the cathinone potent. It is also common for them to sprinkle the plant with water frequently or use refrigeration during transportation.

When the khat leaves are chewed, cathine and cathinone are released and absorbed through the mucous membranes of the mouth as well as the lining of the stomach. The action of cathine and cathinone on the reuptake of epinephrine and norepinephrine has been demonstrated in lab animals, showing that one or both of these chemicals cause(s) the body to recycle these neurotransmitters more slowly, resulting in the wakefulness and insomnia associated with khat use.

Receptors for serotonin show a high affinity for cathinone, suggesting this chemical is responsible for feelings of euphoria associated with chewing khat. In mice, cathinone produces the same types of nervous pacing or repetitive scratching behaviours associated with amphetamines. The effects of cathinone peak after 15 to 30 minutes, with nearly 98% of the substance metabolised into norephedrine by the liver.

Cathine is somewhat less understood, being believed to act upon the adrenergic receptors causing the release of epinephrine and norepinephrine. It has a half-life of about three hours in humans. The medication bromocriptine can reduce cravings and withdrawal symptoms within 24 hours.

== Demographics ==
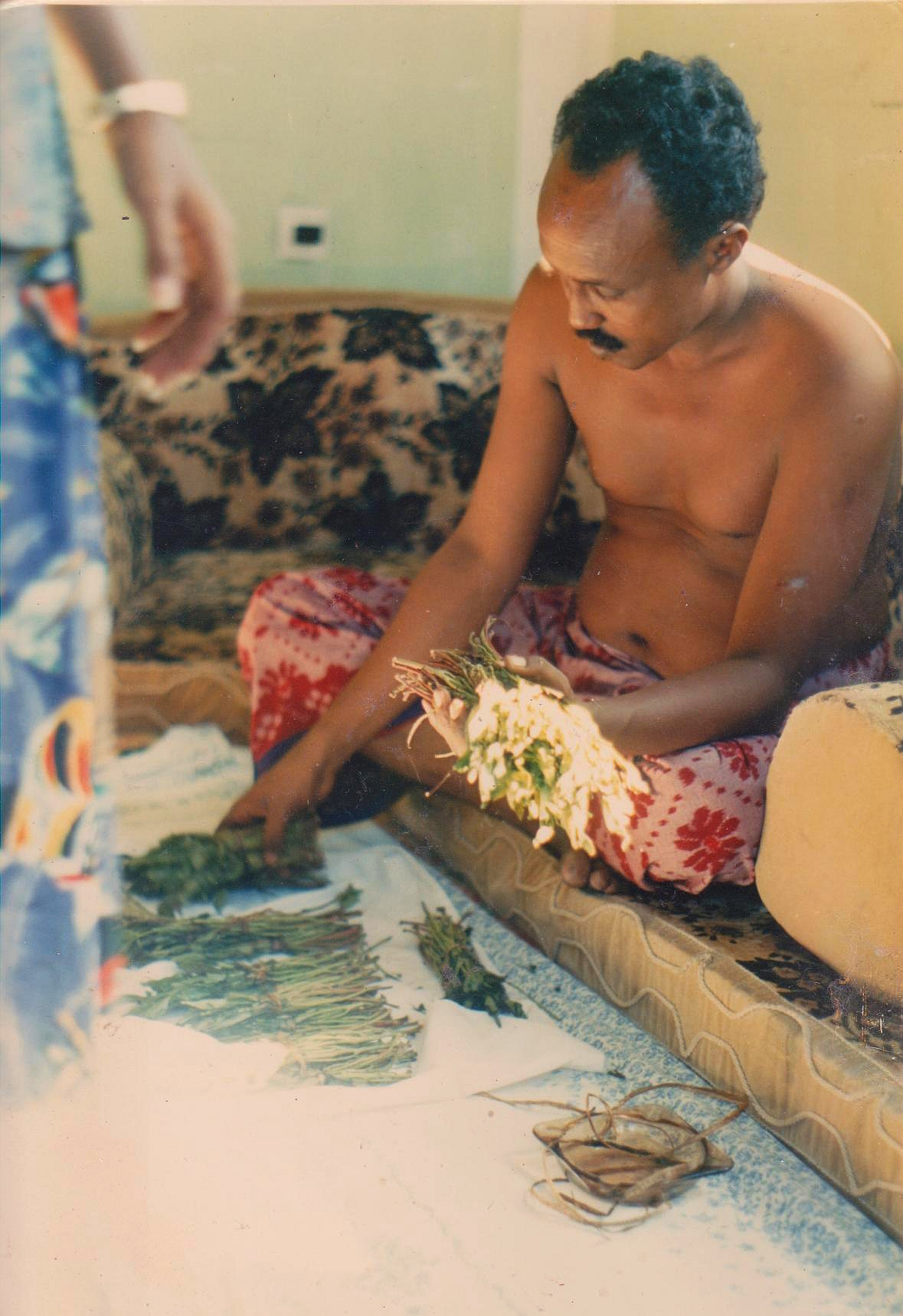
Man in Mogadishu dividing khat into bunches for guests in preparation for a long evening of tea, conversation and chewing

An estimated 5 to 10 million people globally use khat on a daily basis. It is grown principally by communities in the Horn of Africa and the Arabian peninsula, where khat-chewing has a long history as a social custom dating back thousands of years.

The traditional form of khat chewing in Yemen involves only male users; khat chewing by females is less formal and less frequent. Researchers estimate about 70–80% of Yemenis between 16 and 50 years old chew khat, at least on occasion. Approximately 60–90% of male and 35% of female Yemenis chew khat daily. Before Yemeni unification in 1990, khat chewing was largely confined to the north-west mountains of the country, where khat grows. Yemenis spend an estimated 14.6 million man-hours per day chewing khat. Researchers have also estimated that families spend about 17% of their income on khat.

In Ethiopia, khat is chewed by 19.5% of the population and is more commonly chewed by men than women.

== History ==
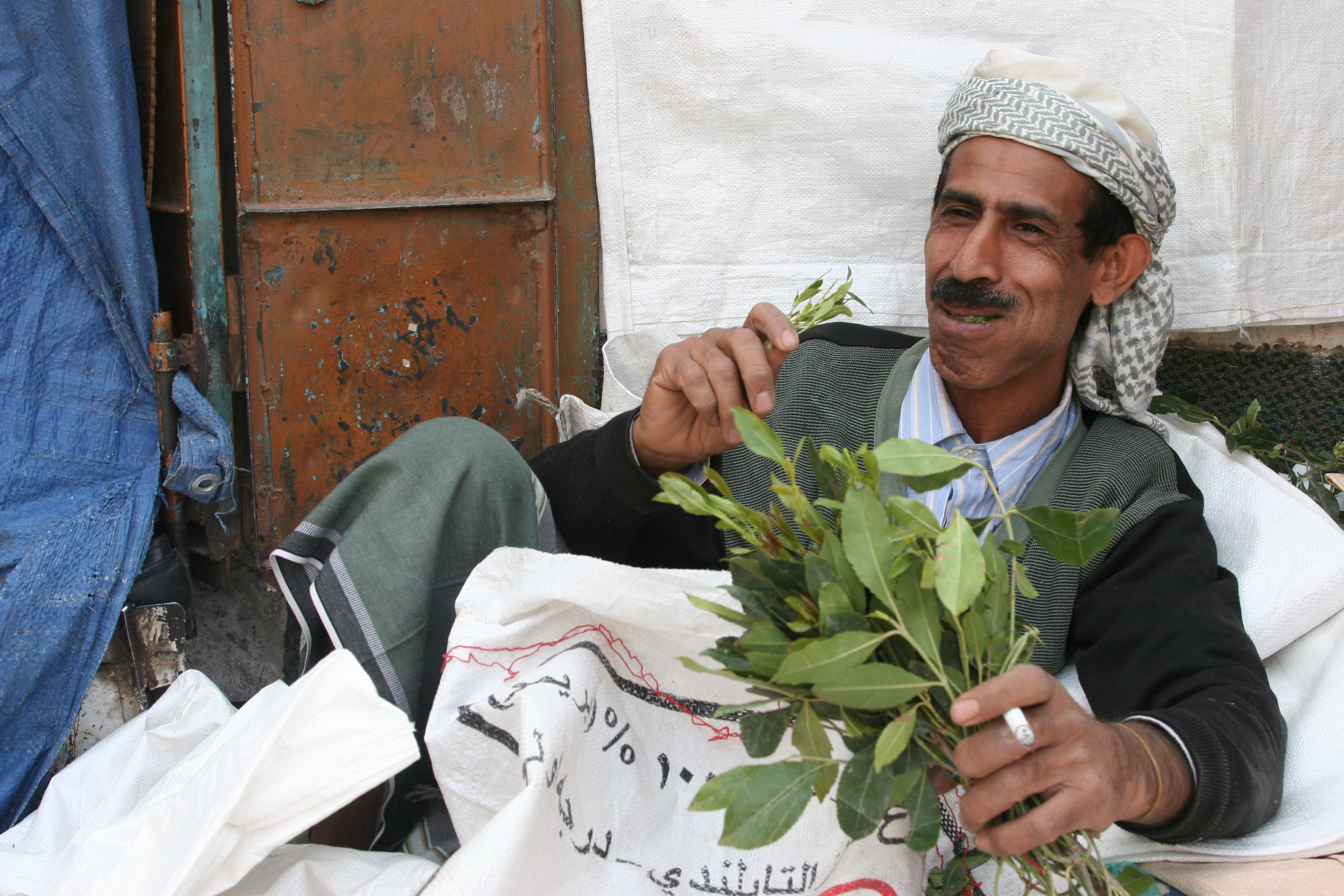
Man chewing khat in Sanaa, Yemen (January 2009)

The inhabitants of Ifat Sultanate were the first to be recorded using khat in the 14th century by Arab historian Ibn Fadlallah al-Umari. The khat plant likely originated in the Horn of Africa specifically Ethiopia-Somali area, from there it spread to Kenya and the Arabian Peninsula. According to nineteenth century British explorer Richard Burton, khat originated in the Emirate of Harar.

Muslim Sufis in the surrounding areas also used it to intensify their mystical experience and to facilitate a sense of union with God.

The earliest known documented description of khat is found in the Kitab al-Saidala fi al-Tibb كتاب الصيدلة في الطب, an 11th-century work on pharmacy and materia medica written by Abū Rayhān al-Bīrūnī, a Persian scientist and biologist. Unaware of its origins, al-Bīrūnī wrote that khat is:

[A] commodity from Turkestan. It is sour to taste and slenderly made in the manner of batan-alu. But khat is reddish with a slight blackish tinge. It is believed that batan-alu is red, coolant, relieves biliousness, and is a refrigerant for the stomach and the liver.

It is mentioned again in a 13th-century publication by the physician Naguib Ad-Din.

In 1854, Malay author Abdullah bin Abdul Kadir noted that the custom of chewing khat was prevalent in Al Hudaydah in Yemen:

You observed a new peculiarity in this city – everyone chewed leaves as goats chew the cud. There is a type of leaf, rather wide and about two fingers in length, which is widely sold, as people would consume these leaves just as they are; unlike betel leaves, which need certain condiments to go with them, these leaves were just stuffed fully into the mouth and munched. Thus when people gathered around, the remnants from these leaves would pile up in front of them. When they spat, their saliva was green. I then queried them on this matter: 'What benefits are there to be gained from eating these leaves?' To which they replied, 'None whatsoever, it's just another expense for us as we've grown accustomed to it.' Those who consume these leaves have to eat lots of ghee and honey, for they would fall ill otherwise. The leaves are known as Kad."

In 1856, English writer Charles Dickens also described the custom of khat chewing in the Horn region and the adjacent Gulf territories, likening it to drinking strong green tea:

And one may sleep well if, during the day, too much kat has not been chewed. The leaves of the drug called kat are the chief source of pleasurable excitement in these districts of East Africa. Botanists, taking the native name for the plant, turn it into Catha edulis, eatable kat. It is much used by the Arabs, to whom it is sent in camel loads, consisting of a number of small parcels, each containing about forty slender twigs, with the leaves attached, carefully, wrapped so as to avoid exposure to the air. These leaves are chewed, and act upon the spirits of those using them, much as a strong dose of green tea acts upon us in Europe, when it acts agreeably. Europeans used to stronger stimulants, are little affected by the use of kat, but among the more temperate Arabs it is so welcome a provocative to good humour, that about two hundred and eighty camel-loads of it are used every year in Aden only.

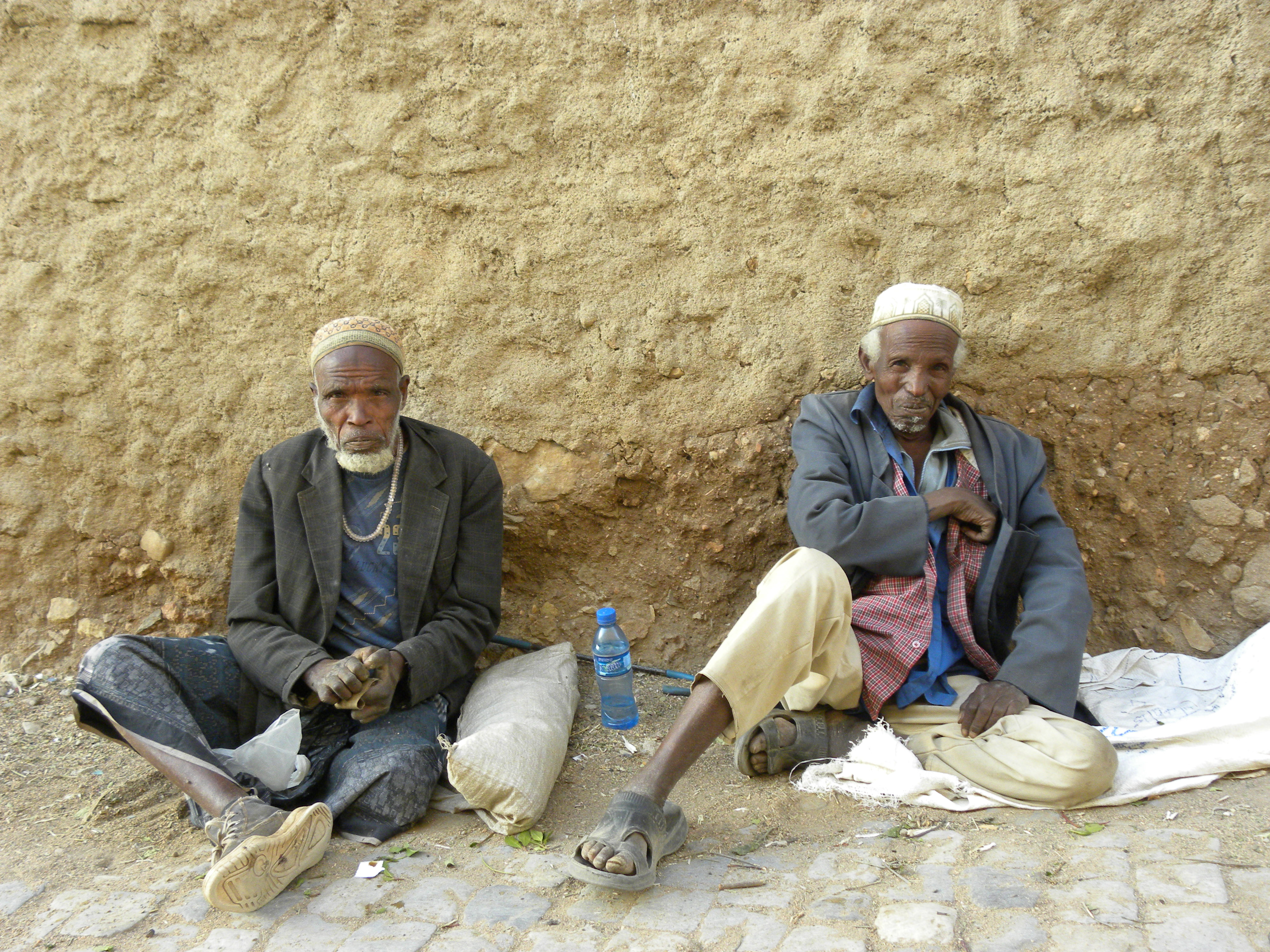
Harari men consuming khat in the street of Harar, Ethiopia

Nowadays khat consumption is limited to East Africa and South Western Arabia. These countries include Djibouti, Ethiopia, Kenya, Somalia (includes Somaliland), Uganda, and Yemen. The author Yousif Al Zarouni writes in his book:

The plant is native to the Arabian Peninsula and the Horn of Africa, despite its native grounds it is only legal in one of the several countries of the Arabian Peninsula, Yemen. The plant however is widely available and legal in East Africa, some African nations on the other hand such as South Africa consider it as a protected species. The plant is mostly used by East Africans and South West Arabians, rarely by people from other places.

Following a ban on khat in the British-governed Aden Protectorate, the Qāt Commission of Inquiry in Aden concluded: "Qāt does not create an addiction, like opium or hashish, in that those who are suddenly deprived of it, do not suffer physical consequences."

== Legal status ==
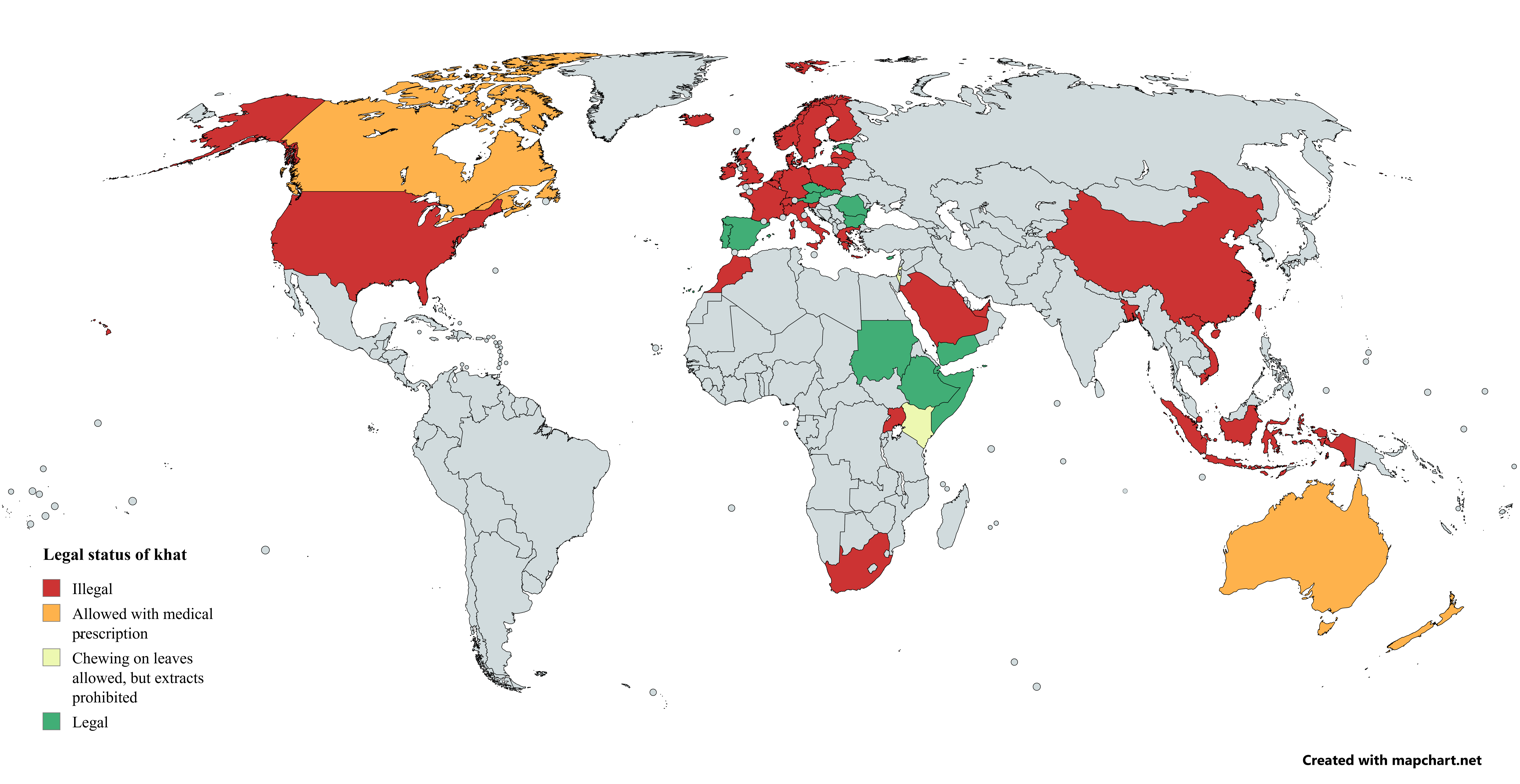
Legal status of khat by country

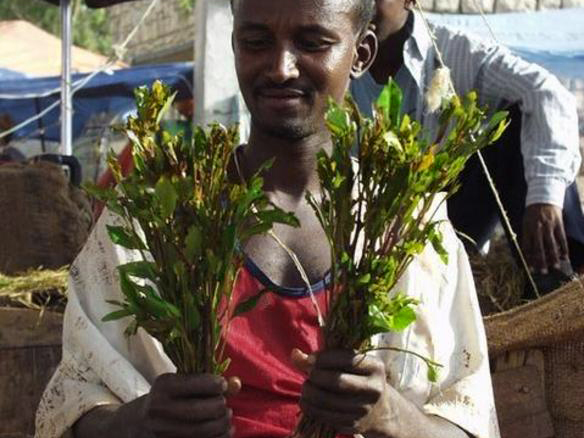
A Burao khat seller displays his products.

In 1965, the World Health Organization (WHO) Expert Committee on Dependence-producing Drugs' Fourteenth Report noted, "The Committee was pleased to note the resolution of the Economic and Social Council with respect to khat, confirming the view that the abuse of this substance is a regional problem and may best be controlled at that level." For this reason, khat was not scheduled under the Single Convention on Narcotic Drugs. In 1980, the WHO classified the plant as a drug of abuse that can produce mild to moderate psychological dependence (less than tobacco or alcohol), although the WHO does not consider khat to be seriously addictive. It is a controlled or illegal substance in some countries, but is legal for sale and production in others.

=== Africa ===
==== Morocco ====
Khat is illegal in Morocco.

==== Ethiopia ====
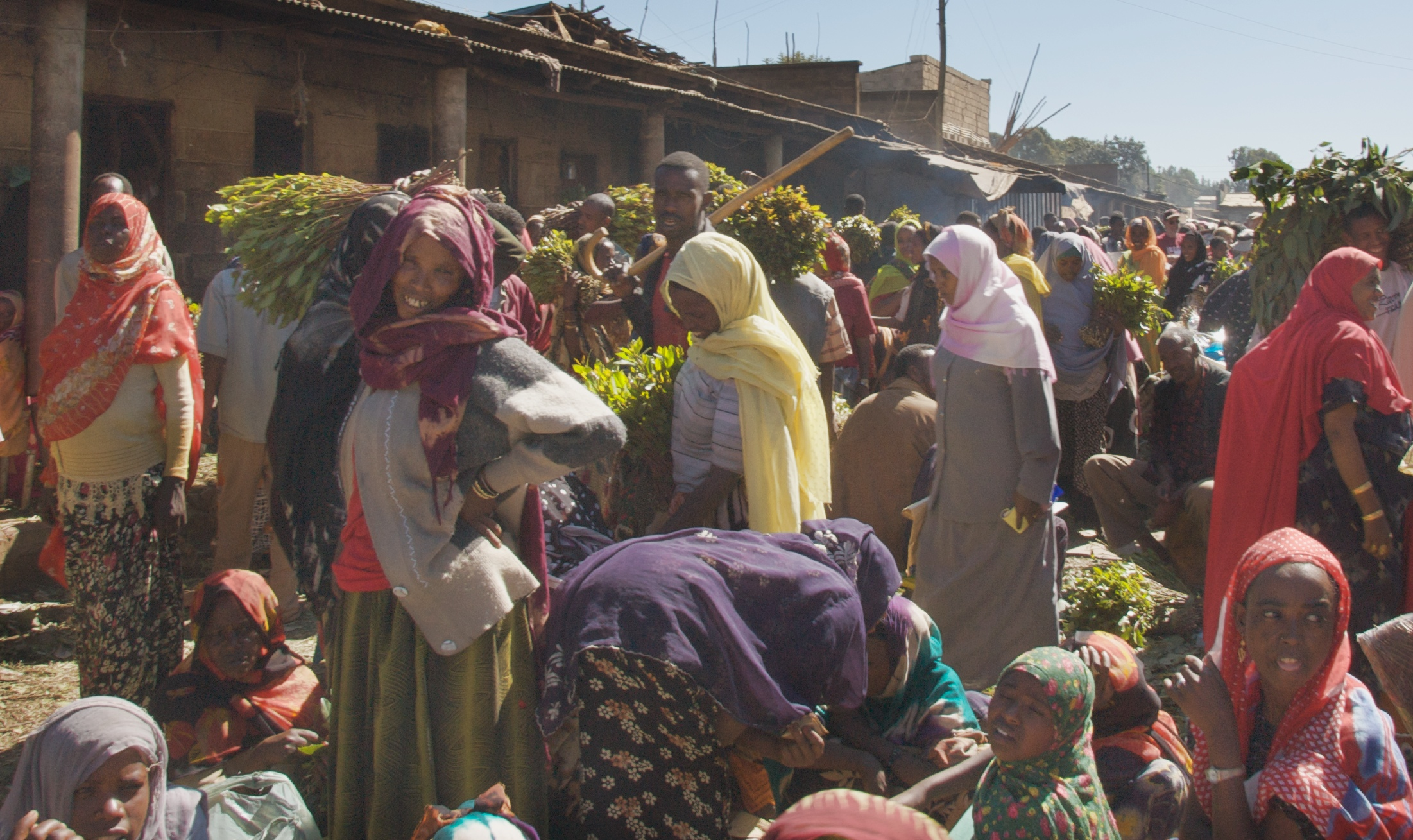
Khat market in Ethiopia

Khat is legal in Ethiopia.

==== Somalia ====
Khat is legal in Somalia.

==== Djibouti ====
Khat is legal in Djibouti.

==== Kenya ====
Khat is legal in Kenya. However, two of its active components, cathinone and cathine, are classed as Class C substances.

==== South Africa ====
In South Africa, Catha edulis is a protected tree.

The use of khat is illegal.

==== Uganda ====
Khat is illegal in Uganda as of 2023.

=== Asia ===
==== Bangladesh ====
Khat is illegal in Bangladesh.

==== China ====
Khat is illegal in China.

==== Hong Kong ====
Khat is regarded as a dangerous drug in Hong Kong. Traffickers can face a penalty up to HK$5 million as well as life imprisonment.

==== Taiwan ====
Khat is illegal and classified as a narcotic drug.

==== India ====
Khat is illegal and classified as a narcotic drug.

==== Israel ====
Khat, called "Gat" in Israel, is consumed mainly by Yemenite Jews and Beta Israel. The activity of chewing its leaves is called "lekhazen" (Hebrew: לכזן). The process of chewing the Gat can take up to several hours. Some chew the Gat in a gathering which is called "takhazina" (Hebrew: תכזינה). The Gat is grown traditionally in private gardens, but it may be found in some markets.

Gat is legal in Israel as long as it is consumed in its natural form, but the distillation of its components is illegal. Some use the plant as a hedge since it is an evergreen.

In 2003, Hagigat, a pill based on extracted cathinone, began to be sold in kiosks in Israel. Following several cases of hospitalisation, the Israeli Ministry of Health classified cathinone as a dangerous drug, and Hagigat was outlawed. The plant itself is allowed to be chewed and sold in its natural state, as no harm was found in normal quantities.

As of June 2012, the Israeli anti-drug authority announced that beverages containing Khat are considered illegal as per the dangerous drug ordinance of the state of Israel.

==== Indonesia ====
Khat is illegal in Indonesia.

==== Saudi Arabia ====
Khat is illegal in Saudi Arabia.

==== Singapore ====
Khat is prohibited in Singapore by the Central Narcotics Bureau (CNB).

==== United Arab Emirates ====
Khat is illegal in the United Arab Emirates under federal law number 14 of 1995 on the Countermeasures against Narcotic Drugs and Psychotropic Substances. Schedule No. 4, Part 2(5) prohibits the cultivation and possession of khat. The possession and selling of khat may lead to life imprisonment.

==== Vietnam ====
Khat is classified as a narcotic drug in Vietnam. The illegal cultivation, possession and distribution of khat are criminally prosecuted. The use of khat may lead to mandatory rehabilitation.

==== Yemen ====
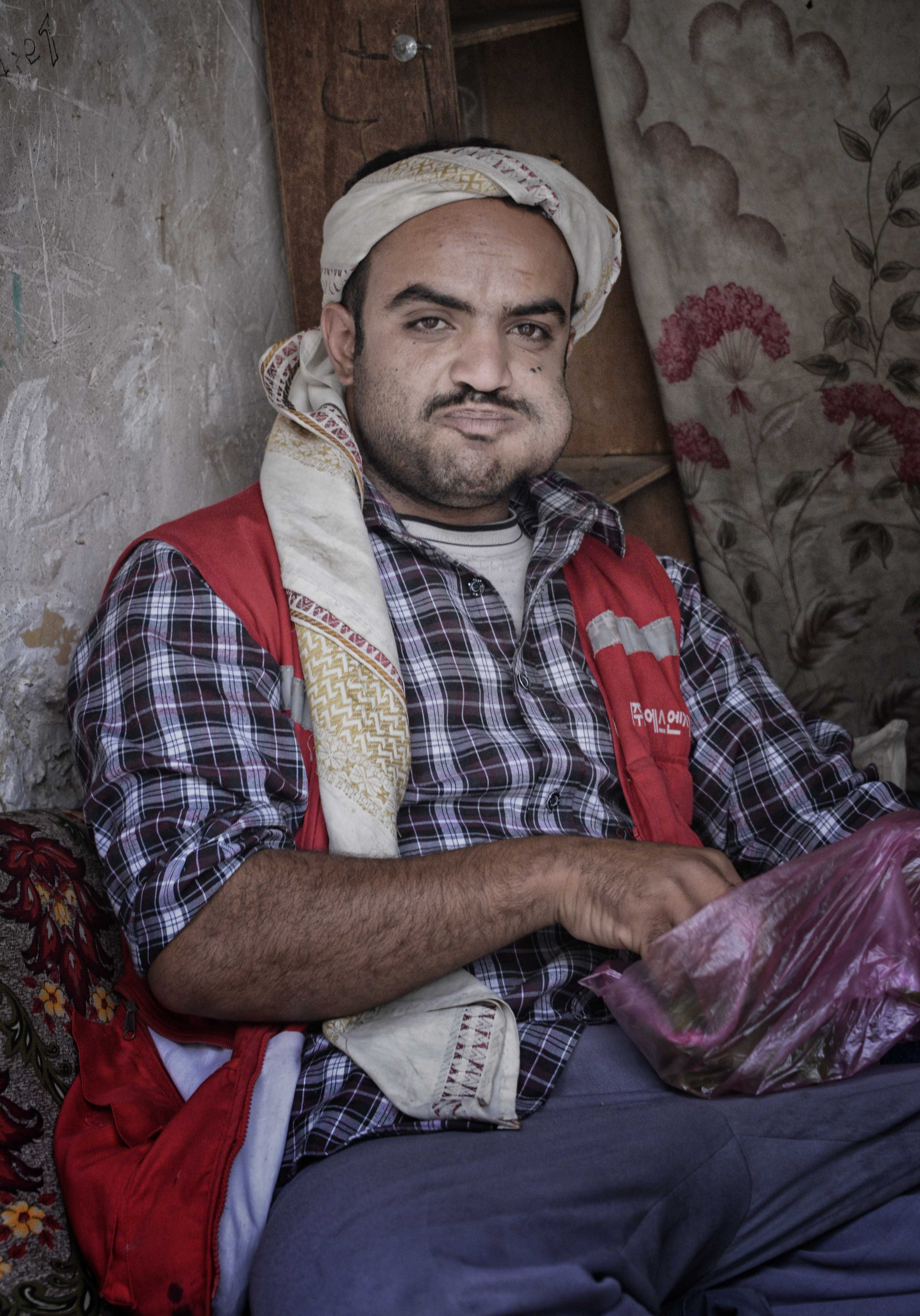
A man chewing khat in Yemen.

Khat is legal in Yemen. However, cultivation of the crop and the selling of its leaves are governed by a series of regulations. In 2007, the Yemeni government passed a law that restricted the cultivation of khat in a number of agricultural flatlands and basins with high water stress. The Law Concerning the General Sales Tax in 2005 also set the tax rate on khat at 20% of its retail price.

The widespread cultivation of khat in Yemen has exacerbated a severe water shortage. Khat is much more water-intensive to grow than other crops. It was claimed to play a major role in a famine in the country.

=== Europe ===
==== Belgium ====
Khat has been illegal in Belgium since 2006.

==== Denmark ====
Khat has been illegal in Denmark since 1993. In 2009, the Danish Health Authority investigated khat use among Somalis in Denmark. A questionnaire with 848 respondents was used. The responses indicated that 48% of Somali males and 16% of females used the narcotic on a monthly basis and that 29% of males and 6% of females used it two times or more a week. Half the respondents had never used khat. The responses indicated that Somalis constituted the great majority of users in Denmark.

The report also investigated attitudes towards khat use among Somalis in Denmark. In total, two out of three respondents stated that khat is a problem for social integration into Danish society, while one in three users stated the same. Responses indicated that two out of three considered khat to be part of Somali culture, although two in three also stated that they agree that khat should be banned in Denmark.

==== Finland ====
Khat is classified as an illegal drug in Finland, and possession, use and sale of the substance is prohibited and punishable. As with all illegal drugs, operating a motor vehicle with detectable levels of Khat or its metabolites in one's system can also lead to a conviction for driving under the influence, even if the driver does not appear intoxicated.

==== France ====
Khat is prohibited in France as a stimulant since 1957.

==== Germany ====
In Germany, cathinone is listed as a "non-trafficable substance", which makes the possession, sale and purchase of fresh khat illegal. The derivative cathine, with "norpseudoephedrine" listed as an alternate name, is only available on prescription.

In 2017, 5815 kg (12,820 lb) of khat was discovered by customs officials in Frankfurt. In June 2018, 324 kg (715 lb) of khat was discovered in packages from East Africa.

==== Greece ====
In the Hellenic Republic, khat is classified as an illegal narcotic under Law 3459/2006 (the Code of Laws on Narcotics).

In August 2025, Greek customs officials at Athens International Airport seized a record 500 kilograms (1000 lb) of khat with an estimated street value of €1.5 million, underscoring its continued prohibition and enforcement.

==== Iceland ====
In August 2010 the Icelandic police intercepted khat smuggling for the first time. 37 kg (82 lb) were confiscated. The drugs were most likely intended for sale in Canada. Again in May 2011 the police intercepted around 60 kg (100 lb).

==== Ireland ====
Khat is a controlled drug for the purpose of the Misuse of Drugs Act 1977 and Schedule 1 of the Misuse of Drugs Regulations 1988. As such its possession and supply is prohibited.

==== Italy ====
Khat is inserted in the Table I of the Italian official list of psychoactive drugs under the name "Catha edulis pianta" (English: "Catha edulis plant") and thus possession is forbidden.

==== Netherlands ====
In the Netherlands, the active ingredients of khat, cathine and cathinone, are qualified as hard drugs and forbidden. Use is mostly limited to the Somali community. In 2008 health minister Ab Klink decided against qualifying the unprocessed plant as drugs after consultation with experts. However, on 9 January 2012 the Dutch government announced a ban on khat.

==== Norway ====
Weight of khat (in kg) confiscated by Norwegian Customs Service 2009-present. The number of confiscations was about 200–350 per year. View source data.

In Norway, khat is classified as a narcotic drug and is illegal to use, sell and possess. Most users are Somali immigrants and khat is smuggled from the Netherlands and the United Kingdom.

Norwegian Customs seized 10 metric tons of khat in 2010, an increase from less than 4 in 2006.

In 2016, Oslo municipality estimated 50–70% of Somali immigrant males to be habitual users.

==== Poland ====
In Poland, khat is a classified narcotic drug, and is illegal to sell and possess.

==== Slovenia ====
Khat is classified as an illegal drug in Slovenia.

==== Sweden ====
Khat (in kg) confiscated by the Swedish Customs Service and Swedish Police from 2000 to 2015. View source data.

The drug was prohibited in Sweden in 1989, without research. In 2007, it was estimated that 30% of Somali males in Sweden were using khat. Smuggling seizures by police amounted to about 9 tonnes annually.

==== Switzerland ====
In Switzerland, khat is illegal and it is classified as a narcotic drug.

==== United Kingdom ====
Khat was made illegal in the UK on 24 June 2014. Concerns had been expressed by commentators, health professionals and community members about the use of khat in the UK, particularly by immigrants from Somalia, Yemen and Ethiopia. Studies of the effects of khat use by immigrants on their mental health suggested that there was a need for better research on khat-chewing and its possible link with psychiatric disorders; it also suggested that public discourse on the issue displayed elements of a moral panic. Some Somali community organisations also campaigned for khat to be banned. As a result of these concerns, the Home Office commissioned successive research studies to look into the matter, and in 2005, presented the question of khat's legal status before the Advisory Council on the Misuse of Drugs. The study concluded that most of the participants who were using khat were using it moderately in terms of both the quantity used and the frequency and duration of chewing sessions, and that khat use was typically a social activity. Only a small minority of the study participants' khat use was judged to be excessive. After a careful review of the evidence, the Advisory Council on the Misuse of Drugs recommended in January 2006 that the status of khat as a legal substance should remain for the time being.

In 2008, Conservative politician Sayeeda Warsi stated that a future Conservative government would ban khat. The website of the Conservative Party, which in 2010 became the larger party in a UK coalition government, previously stated that a Conservative government would "Tackle unacceptable cultural practices by", amongst other measures, "classifying Khat". In 2009, the Home Office commissioned two new studies in the effects of khat use and in June 2010, a Home Office spokesperson stated: "The Government is committed to addressing any form of substance misuse and will keep the issue of khat use under close scrutiny".

During a parliamentary debate on the legality issue on 11 January 2012, Mark Lancaster, the Conservative Member of Parliament for Milton Keynes, stated that the importation of Khat into the UK stands at 10 tonnes every week.

On 23 January 2013, the Advisory Council on the Misuse of Drugs (ACMD) said there was "insufficient evidence" that khat caused health problems. The ACMD said there was "no evidence" khat was directly linked with serious or organised crime, and was chewed to obtain a "mild stimulant effect much less potent than stimulant drugs, such as amphetamine".

On 3 July 2013, the British Home Secretary Theresa May announced that khat was to be banned in Britain, designating it a Class C substance under the Misuse of Drugs Act 1971.

Alex Miller, a journalist from the Montreal, Canada-based magazine and television channel Vice, looked into the use of the substance and the potential impact of the ban for BBC nightly current affairs programme Newsnight and for a Vice documentary.

Kenyan MPs appealed to the UK not to "condemn people" by banning the herbal stimulant khat

In March 2014, the United Kingdom House of Commons' Home Affairs Select Committee announced that it would continue to lobby for the UK government not to go through with its intended ban on khat. The committee had shortly before also completed an inquiry and a report recommending that the British authorities refrain from banning the plant.

On 12 May 2014, the House of Lords passed a Motion to Approve the Misuse of Drugs Act 1971 (Designation)(Amendment) (No. 2)(England, Wales and Scotland) Order 2014, in order to control Catha edulis as a Class C drug. An amendment was proposed stating that, "this House regrets that Her Majesty's Government's plans for the introduction of the Order do not include provisions for a 12-month review of the impact of the reclassification of khat in view of the highly unusual community focus of its use, for putting a detailed policing strategy in place before a ban takes effect, or for a health strategy to prevent a transfer of addiction to other substances; and do not commit the Department for International Development to do more work with the government of Kenya to alleviate the effect of the reclassification on the Kenyan economy." However, the amendment was defeated by vote. The prohibition came into effect on 24 June 2014.

In January 2015, the Bristol Post reported that most khat houses in the city had closed down, "forcing users to take the drug in their homes instead". The local police had initially not sought to enforce the ban, giving users a grace period, but according to the Bristol Post had recently started to take action against khat use and had issued three warnings and a caution. Additionally, in September 2014 the police had seized 24 bags of dried khat from a property in Easton, but no arrests were made. Additionally, the Somali Resource Centre indicated that the ban seemed to have been effective, and that the prohibition had all but destroyed the import market since the plant has to be fresh in order to be consumed. A consultation with Somalis in Glasgow undertaken by the national voluntary organisation Fast Forward at the request of the Somali Association in Glasgow in October 2014 suggested that khat continues to be used in both fresh and dried forms by some Somalis in the city, and that the ban has also led some users to seek out other substances. The ban has reportedly served to increase the price of khat in the UK. Channel 4 News reported in September 2014 that before the ban, 20 tonnes of khat arrived at Heathrow Airport daily, and it would sell for £3 per bundle. After the ban, it was reportedly selling at £30 per bundle.

=== North America ===
==== Canada ====
In Canada, khat is a controlled substance under Schedule IV of the Controlled Drugs and Substances Act (CDSA), meaning it is illegal to seek or obtain unless approved by a medical practitioner. Possession of khat for personal use is not an arraignable offence in Canada. The maximum punishment for trafficking or possession with the intent of trafficking is ten years in prison.

In 2008, Canadian authorities reported that khat is the most common illegal drug being smuggled at airports.

However, in 2012 the Ontario Court of Appeal upheld a 2011 absolute discharge of a young woman who brought 34 kilograms (75 lb) of khat into Canada in 2009. According to the defence, the ruling recognises that there is no empirical evidence that khat is harmful. The courts in Quebec and Ontario continued to discharge the accused for bringing khat into Canada for the same reason (no evidence of harmfulness of khat) in 2014 and 2016.

==== United States ====
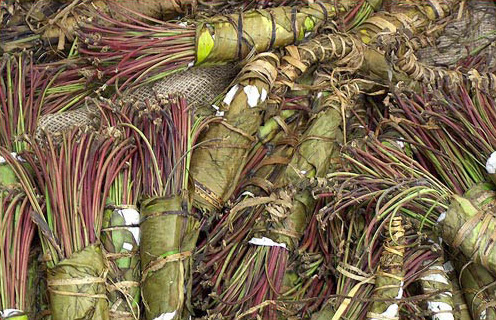
Bundles of khat, seized by the DEA in July 2006

In the United States, cathinone is a Schedule I drug, according to the US Controlled Substances Act. The 1993 DEA rule placing cathinone in Schedule I noted that it was effectively also banning khat:

Cathinone is the major psychoactive component of the plant Catha edulis (khat). The young leaves of khat are chewed for a stimulant effect. Enactment of this rule results in the placement of any material that contains cathinone into Schedule I.

Catha edulis (khat) is a stimulant similar to that of amphetamine and its congeners, not a drug as categorised by US FDA (United States Food & Drug Administration) and FDA import Alert #66-23 (published date 03/18/2011) states that "Districts may detain, without physical examination, all entries of khat", based on section 801(a) (3) of the Federal Food, Drug, and Cosmetic Act on the grounds that "its labeling fails to bear adequate directions for use."

As federal and local khat raids have often targeted immigrants from countries where khat is legal, issues of cultural misunderstanding have sometimes been raised.

The plant itself is specifically banned in Missouri:

Khat, to include all parts of the plant presently classified botanically as catha edulis, whether growing or not; the seeds thereof; any extract from any part of such plant; and every compound, manufacture, salt, derivative, mixture, or preparation of the plant, its seed or extracts.

In California, both the plant itself as well as cathinone, its active component, are illegal.

=== Oceania ===
==== Australia ====
In Australia, the importation of khat is controlled under the Customs (Prohibited Imports) Regulations 1956. It is illegal to import khat into Australia for personal use. Khat can be imported only for medical or scientific use.

Importing khat without a permit is subject to fines or prosecution. In 2003, the total number of khat annual permits was 294 and the total number of individual khat permits was 202; however as of 1 December 2013, permits for the use of khat by individuals for recreational/cultural purposes are no longer issued. There are currently no plans by the Australian Government to amend the regulations to allow the importation of khat for personal use.

Khat is listed as a Schedule 2 dangerous drug in Queensland, in the same category as cannabis. In the states of Victoria, New South Wales and Tasmania, khat does not appear to be regulated through criminal legislation.

The importation of Khat (Catha edulis) material (includes material that is fresh, dried, powdered, capsules or tablets) is prohibited under the Customs (Prohibited Import) Regulations 1956 unless the person importing the material is the holder of both a license to import and a permit to import granted by the Therapeutic Goods Administration (TGA).

==== New Zealand ====
In New Zealand, khat is listed as a Class C drug, in the same category as cannabis and codeine.

=== South America ===
In South America, there is no legislation regarding khat; the active ingredients in the plant can be found in several weight control compounds sold in the continent.

== Biofuel ==
The possibility of Khat waste has been explored as a biofuel. It may be a possible future fuel, especially in developing countries. Some chemical groups that are essential for biofuel properties, such as alkene groups and O-H bonds have been found in Khat waste.

== Research programs ==
In 2009, the University of Minnesota launched the Khat Research Program (KRP), a multidisciplinary research and training program focusing on the neurobehavioral and health effects of khat, led by Mustafa al'Absi. The program was funded by the National Institutes of Health and the National Institute for Drug Abuse of the United States. The inaugural event for the KRP was held in Sharm El-Sheik, Egypt, in December 2009 in collaboration with the International Brain Research Organization (IBRO) and its local affiliates.

== See also ==
- Betel leaves, an herb in Southeast Asia
- Coca, an herb used in the production of cocaine and traditionally chewed
- List of Southern African indigenous trees
- Phenylpropanolamine
- Substituted cathinone
- Use of drugs in warfare

== Bibliography ==
- Abdulle, Sahal (2 January 2007). "Somali Islamists are gone – so 'khat' is back!". Mogadishu: Reuters. Archived from the original on 1 February 2014.
- Al Zarouni, Yousif (2015). The Effects of Khat (Catha Edulis). London: Yousif Al Zarouni.
- Anderson, David; Beckerleg, Susan; Hailu, Degol; Klein, Axel (2007). The Khat Controversy: Stimulating the Debate on Drugs. Berg. ISBN 978-1-84788-335-3.
- Beckerleg, Susan (2010). Ethnic Identity and Development: Khat and Social Change in Africa. New York: Palgrave Macmillan US. ISBN 978-0-230-10778-6.
- Carrier, Neil C. M. (2007). Kenyan Khat: The Social Life of a Stimulant. Leiden: Brill. ISBN 978-90-04-15659-3.
- Gatter, Peer (2012). Politics of Qat: The Role of a Drug in Ruling Yemen. Wiesbaden: Ludwig Reichert Verlag. ISBN 978-3-89500-910-5. Link to the table of contents and to selected chapters.
- Gebissa, Ezekiel (2004). Leaf of Allah: Khat & Agricultural Transformation in Harerge, Ethiopia 1875–1991. Athens, Ohio: Ohio University Press. ISBN 978-0-85255-480-7.
- Gebissa, Ezekiel (2010). Taking the Place of Food: Khat in Ethiopia. Trenton: Red Sea Press. ISBN 978-1-56902-317-4.
- Gezon, Lisa (2012). Drug Effects: Khat in Biocultural and Socioeconomic Perspective. Walnut Creek: Left Coast Press. ISBN 978-1-61132-788-5.
- Pendell, Dale (2002). Pharmakodynamis: Stimulating Plants, Potions and Herbcraft: Excitantia and Empathogenica. San Francisco: Mercury House.
- Randrianame, Maurice; Shahandeh, B.; Szendrei, Kalman; Tongue, Archer; International Council on Alcohol and Addictions (1983). The health and socio-economic aspects of khat use. Lausanne: The Council.
