= Oueil Behi Mohamed =

Tunisian volleyball player (born 1949)

Personal information
- Nationality: Tunisian
- Born: 18 January 1949 (age 76)

Sport
- Sport: Volleyball

Oueil Behi Mohamed (born 18 January 1949) is a Tunisian volleyball player. He competed in the men's tournament at the 1972 Summer Olympics.
