= Healing Words: Poetry and Medicine =

2008 documentary

- Language: English
- Subject: Poetry - Therapeutic use
- Publisher: Healing Words Productions
- Publication date: 2008
- Publication place: United States
- Media type: DVD video
- ISBN: 978-0-7936-9468-6
- OCLC: 244301912
- Dewey Decimal: 615.8515
- Directors = James Cavenaugh, David Drewry; Studio = Healing Words Productions; Distributor = Public Broadcasting Service

Healing Words: Poetry and Medicine is a sixty-minute documentary (ISBN 978-0-7936-9468-6) filmed in 2008 primarily at Shands at the University of Florida. The production portrays individuals in personal quest to recover psychologically and physically from illnesses that have dramatically changed their lives. This film validates expressive art in medical settings can build doctor–patient relationships and be a supportive companion in the healing process.

== Production ==
The Witter Bynner Fellowship, the LEAW Family Foundation, and the Grand Marnier Foundation provided the funding for the Healing Words Productions to complete the film. PBS Home Video, a department of the Public Broadcasting Service, currently distributes the production. The Society for Arts in Healthcare serves as a support system for physicians and therapists seeking creative, healing activities for critically ill patients. The Shands at the University of Florida is featured in the film and is the first hospital in the United States to fully support arts as an integral part of healing.

== Overview ==
Each chapter of this film features people that are changing the wisdom and ways of healthcare. Three physicians from Shands Hospital are featured in the film: Rob Lawrence, a pediatrician; Michael S. Okun, a neurologist; and John Graham- Pole, a pediatrician and Hospice director. John Fox, author and certified poetry therapist, joins the team. These four men are combining forces to explore expressive arts in medical settings. It is their assertion that language can carry people from loss to hope. The men speak individually to the audience and also speak privately and in groups with patients. An eighteen-year-old young man with a bone marrow disease, an adolescent girl suffering from nine years of pain, a teenager with sickle-cell anemia, a cancer patient, and a heart disease patient are among the patients with whom the doctors visit and develop close relationships. The doctors also write and share poetry. In a reflective writing class, John Fox engages medical students in poetry, stating that arts and poetry can help medical persons look at their experiences of illnesses not just from a biomedical perspective but also from what an illness means human to human. The physician and the poet can both be healers, and this fact needs to be noticed by the medical field. Dr. Okun provides solid explanations about endorphins and how behavioral interactions can change the brain. Dr. Lawrence provides precious and passionate interactions with his patients. This film shows that compassion can flourish in a sterile environment.

== Healing and creative processes ==
Poems are emotional opinions giving a voice to innermost joy and pain. Poems are inspirational, therapeutic, and healing. Most healing "lies in the recovery of a personal sense of meaning, that capacity which enables us to endure difficulties, to find and draw on unsuspected strength". and creative processes are companions, yet they are perceived as separate. Art Therapy proves itself as a valid process to help individuals of all ages resolve conflicts and problems, manage behavior, reduce stress, increase self-esteem and self-awareness and achieve insight. Poetry can help a person get in touch with inner feelings and emotions in order to become oriented in his/her new situation.

== Narrative medicine ==
Research based on the phenomenon of narratives as agents of healing is of increasing significance in the fields of psychology and medicine. Narrative medicine can help nurses, doctors, social workers, and patients work together.
