= Farzad Goli =

Iranian medical psychotherapist, philosopher and poet

- فرزاد گلی
- Citizenship: Iranian
- Education: University of Freiburg
- Occupations: Medical psychotherapist, philosopher, poet
- Employer: Iranian Academy of Medical Sciences
- Known for: Psychosomatic medicine, biosemiotics, Bioenergy Economy
- Notable work: Biosemiotic Medicine: Healing in the World of Meaning; Bioenergy Economy: A Methodological Study on Bioenergy-Based Therapies

Farzad Goli (Persian: فرزاد گلی) is an Iranian medical psychotherapist, philosopher, and poet. His work primarily focuses on psychosomatic medicine, biosemiotics, and integrative health models. He is the editor-in-chief of the International Journal of Body, Mind and Culture. He has authored several theoretical and empirical articles, as well as books, in both English and Persian. His published poetry includes Gāh-e Negāh: On Inner Society and Emruznāmeh: A Self-Work Calendar, two collections that explore inner experience through phenomenological observation and mindful attention.

== Career and contributions ==
Farzad Goli completed a fellowship in psychosomatic medicine and psychotherapy at the University of Freiburg, Germany.

He is the founder of the Danesh-e Tandorosti Institute (established in 1997) and the Behi Academy in British Columbia (founded in 2024). Through these institutions, he has led numerous research and postgraduate education projects in psychosomatic medicine, collaborating with institutions such as Albert-Ludwigs-Universität, Isfahan University of Medical Sciences, and Mashhad University of Medical Sciences.

Goli is a scientific member of the Education, Bioethics, and Philosophy of Medicine Department at the Iranian Academy of Medical Sciences. His publications identify him with the department and with Behi Academy in Vancouver, British Columbia.

Since the early 2000s, he has taught in programs focused on body-centered, systemic, and transpersonal psychology, and has contributed to the fields of philosophy of medicine and biosemiotics. His work has appeared in publications dealing with psychosomatic medicine, biosemiotics, mind-body relations, and health promotion.

Goli has also contributed chapters to successive editions of Psychosomatic Medicine: An International Guide for the Primary Care Setting. In the 2014 edition, he was a co-author of chapters on traditional medicine and psychosomatic medicine, doctor-patient communication, psycho-oncology, psycho-cardiology, and psychosomatic medicine in Iran. He also contributed chapters to the 2019 edition and the 2026 third edition of the book.

The 2026 edition includes Goli as a co-author of chapters including "What Is Psychosomatic Medicine?", "Traditional Medicine and Psychosomatic Medicine", "The Doctor–Patient Relationship", "Doctor–Patient Communication", "Family-Oriented Primary Care", "Balint Group", "Psychooncology", "Psychocardiology", and "Development of Psychosomatic Medicine in Iran".

Radio Behi is a Persian-language science podcast hosted by Farzad Goli. Drawing on psychosomatic medicine and cultural psychology, it explores the biosemiotics of meaning-making processes across body, mind, and culture.

== Publications ==
=== English books and chapters ===
- Biosemiotic Medicine: Healing in the World of Meaning (Springer, 2016).
- Bioenergy Economy: A Methodological Study on Bioenergy-Based Therapies (2010).
- Goli, F. (2022). "Body, Meaning, and Time" in Epigenetics and Anticipation. Springer.
- Fritzsche, K., Goli, F., & Dobos, C. M. (2026). "What Is Psychosomatic Medicine?" In K. Fritzsche, S. H. McDaniel, & M. Wirsching (Eds.), Psychosomatic Medicine: An International Guide for the Primary Care Setting (3rd ed., pp. 3–17). Springer, Cham.
- Fritzsche, K., Abbo, C., Zanjani, H. A., & Goli, F. (2026). "Traditional Medicine and Psychosomatic Medicine." In Psychosomatic Medicine: An International Guide for the Primary Care Setting (3rd ed., pp. 37–45). Springer, Cham.
- Fritzsche, K., Diaz-Monsalve, S., Abbo, C., Goli, F., & Dobos, C. M. (2026). "The Doctor–Patient Relationship." In Psychosomatic Medicine: An International Guide for the Primary Care Setting (3rd ed., pp. 49–61). Springer, Cham.
- Fritzsche, K., Schweickhardt, A., Diaz-Monsalve, S., Zanjani, H. A., Goli, F., & Dobos, C. M. (2026). "Doctor–Patient Communication." In Psychosomatic Medicine: An International Guide for the Primary Care Setting (3rd ed., pp. 63–89). Springer, Cham.
- Geigges, W., Fritzsche, K., Dobos, C. M., McDaniel, S. H., Zhao, X., Abbo, C., Diaz-Monsalve, S., & Goli, F. (2026). "Family-Oriented Primary Care." In Psychosomatic Medicine: An International Guide for the Primary Care Setting (3rd ed., pp. 91–108). Springer, Cham.
- Fritzsche, K., Dobos, C. M., Diaz-Monsalve, S., Chen, F. K.-Y., Wei, J., Shi, L., & Goli, F. (2026). "Balint Group." In Psychosomatic Medicine: An International Guide for the Primary Care Setting (3rd ed., pp. 109–120). Springer, Cham.
- Fritzsche, K., Diaz-Monsalve, S., Zanjani, H. A., Goli, F., & Dobos, C. M. (2026). "Psychooncology." In Psychosomatic Medicine: An International Guide for the Primary Care Setting (3rd ed., pp. 223–241). Springer, Cham.
- Fritzsche, K., Diaz-Monsalve, S., Zanjani, H. A., Goli, F., Chen, F. K.-Y., & Dobos, C. M. (2026). "Psychocardiology." In Psychosomatic Medicine: An International Guide for the Primary Care Setting (3rd ed., pp. 243–255). Springer, Cham.
- Goli, F., & Zanjani, H. A. (2026). "Development of Psychosomatic Medicine in Iran." In Psychosomatic Medicine: An International Guide for the Primary Care Setting (3rd ed., pp. 429–437). Springer, Cham.

=== Persian works ===
- Gāh-e Negāh: On Inner Society (Persian: گاهِ نگاه: گزارشی در جمعیت‌شناسی درون), a phenomenological and mindfulness-oriented poetry collection. Asim, first edition, 2009–2010 (Dey 1388 SH), 82 pages. ISBN 978-964-418-467-3.
- Emruznāmeh: A Self-Work Calendar (Persian: امروزنامه: گاه‌شمار خویشکاری جان), a phenomenological and mindfulness-oriented poetry collection. Dehkadeh Salamat, first edition, 2022 (1401 SH), 456 pages. ISBN 978-622-96899-7-4.
- A Bridge, Thirty-three Contemplations (TEDx presentation, 2019).
- Conscious Evolution Knowledge.
- Life-Oriented Medicine.
- Nothing Nothings.
- Behi Program, Workshops of Bioenergy Economy.
- Body and All Its Times; Psychosomatic Dynamics in Loss, Grief, and Trauma.

== Selected publications ==
- Goli, F. (2019). "Psychosomatics; from Darwinian War to Peircean Love." International Journal of Body, Mind and Culture, 6(3), 118–119.
- Goli, F. (2023). "A Note on Defamiliarization of Health; from Completeness to Wholeness." International Journal of Body, Mind and Culture, 10(1), 1–3.
- Goli, F. (2024). "Biosemiotic medicines: Symbolic formulations for placebo enhancements." Journal of Education and Health Promotion, 13, 156.
- Goli, F. (2025). "Pleasure, Power, Meaning, and Beyond: Towards a Biosemiotic Model of Wellbeing." International Journal of Body, Mind and Culture, 12(1), 7–23.
- Goli, F., et al. (2025). "Effectiveness of Bioenergy Economy-based Health Improvement (BEHI) versus Acceptance and Commitment Therapy (ACT) on the Psychological Comorbidities and Quality of Life in Patients with Inflammatory Bowel Disease." Crohn's & Colitis 360, 7(2).
