= Psychosomatic medicine =

Interdisciplinary medical field exploring various influences on bodily processes

Psychosomatic medicine is an interdisciplinary medical field exploring the relationships among social, psychological, behavioral factors on bodily processes and quality of life in humans and animals.

The academic forebearer of the modern field of behavioral medicine and a part of the practice of consultation-liaison psychiatry, psychosomatic medicine integrates interdisciplinary evaluation and management involving diverse specialties including psychiatry, psychology, neurology, psychoanalysis, internal medicine, pediatrics, surgery, allergy, dermatology, and psychoneuroimmunology. Clinical situations where mental processes act as a major factor affecting medical outcomes are areas where psychosomatic medicine has competence.

== Psychosomatic disorders ==
Some physical diseases are believed to have a mental component derived from stresses and strains of everyday living. Some researchers have suggested, for example, that lower back pain and high blood pressure may be related to stresses in everyday life. The psychosomatic framework additionally sees mental and emotional states as capable of significantly influencing the course of any physical illness. Psychiatry traditionally distinguishes between psychosomatic disorders, disorders in which mental factors play a significant role in the development, expression, or resolution of a physical illness, and somatoform disorders, disorders in which mental factors are the sole cause of a physical illness.

It is difficult to establish for certain whether an illness has a psychosomatic component. A psychosomatic component is often inferred when there are some aspects of the patient's presentation that are unaccounted for by biological factors, or some cases where there is no biological explanation at all. For instance, Helicobacter pylori causes 80% of peptic ulcers. However, most people living with Helicobacter pylori do not develop ulcers, and 20% of patients with ulcers have no H. pylori infection. Therefore, in these cases, psychological factors may still play some role. Similarly, in irritable bowel syndrome (IBS), there are abnormalities in the behavior of the gut. However, there are no actual structural changes in the gut, so stress and emotions may play a role.

The strongest perspective on psychosomatic disorders is that attempting to distinguish between purely physical and mixed psychosomatic disorders is obsolete, as almost all physical illness have mental factors that determine their onset, presentation, maintenance, susceptibility to treatment, and resolution. According to this view, even the course of serious illnesses, such as cancer, can potentially be influenced by a person's thoughts, feelings, and general state of mental health.

Addressing such factors is the remit of the applied field of behavioral medicine. In modern society, psychosomatic aspects of illness are often attributed to stress, making the remediation of stress one important factor in the development, treatment, and prevention of psychosomatic illness.

== Research and clinical relevance ==
Psychosomatic medicine has clarified bidirectional links between hepatitis C virus (HCV) infection and psychiatric disorders. Large cohort and review studies have demonstrated elevated rates of mood, anxiety, substance use, and psychotic disorders among individuals with hepatitis C. In turn, higher hepatitis C seroprevalence has been observed among individuals with serious mental illness, highlighting the importance of routine screening and integrated care models in these populations. These findings underscore the need for coordinated care that addresses both the physical and mental health aspects of patients with hepatitis C.

Early contributions by Muhamad Aly Rifai and colleagues synthesized psychiatric considerations in hepatitis C care and reported treatment outcomes in psychiatric populations, paving the way for later guidance on screening and management in mental health settings. Their work significantly informed later clinical guidelines and highlighted the importance of considering psychiatric comorbidities when managing hepatitis C patients.

== Connotations of the term "psychosomatic illness" ==
The term psychosomatic disease was most likely first used by Paul D. MacLean in his 1949 seminal paper ‘Psychosomatic disease and the “visceral brain”; recent developments bearing on the Papez theory of emotions.’ In the field of psychosomatic medicine, the phrase "psychosomatic illness" is used more narrowly than it is within the general population. For example, in lay language, the term often encompasses illnesses with no physical basis at all, and even illnesses that are faked (malingering).

In contrast, in contemporary psychosomatic medicine, the term is normally restricted to those illnesses that do have a clear physical basis, but where it is believed that psychological and mental factors also play a role. Some researchers within the field believe that this overly broad interpretation of the term may have caused the discipline to fall into disrepute clinically. For this reason, among others, the field of behavioral medicine has taken over much of the remit of psychosomatic medicine in practice and there exist large areas of overlap in the scientific research.

== Criticism ==
Studies have yielded mixed evidence regarding the impact of psychosomatic factors in illnesses. Early evidence suggested that patients with advanced-stage cancer may be able to survive longer if provided with psychotherapy to improve their social support and outlook. However, a major review published in 2007, which evaluated the evidence for these benefits, concluded that no studies meeting the minimum quality standards required in this field have demonstrated such a benefit. The review further argues that unsubstantiated claims that "positive outlook" or "fighting spirit" can help slow cancer may be harmful to the patients themselves if they come to believe that their poor progress results from "not having the right attitude".

== Treatment ==
While in the U.S., psychosomatic medicine is considered a subspecialty of the fields of psychiatry and neurology, in Germany and other European countries it is considered a subspecialty of internal medicine. Thure von Uexküll and contemporary physicians following his thoughts regard the psychosomatic approach as a core attitude of medical doctors, thereby declaring it not as a subspecialty, but rather an integrated part of every specialty. Medical treatments and psychotherapy are used to treat illnesses believed to have a psychosomatic component.

== History ==
In the medieval Islamic world the Persian psychologist-physicians Ahmed ibn Sahl al-Balkhi (d. 934) and Haly Abbas (d. 994) developed an early model of illness that emphasized the interaction of the mind and the body. He proposed that a patient's physiology and psychology can influence one another.

Contrary to Hippocrates and Galen, Ahmed ibn Sahl al-Balkhi did not believe that mere regulation and modulation of the body tempers and medication would remedy mental disorders because words play a vital and necessary role in emotional regulation. To change such behaviors, he used techniques, such as belief altering, regular musing, rehearsals of experiences, and imagination.

In the beginnings of the 20th century, there was a renewed interest in psychosomatic concepts. Psychoanalyst Franz Alexander had a deep interest in understanding the dynamic interrelation between mind and body. Sigmund Freud pursued a deep interest in psychosomatic illnesses following his correspondence with Georg Groddeck who was, at the time, researching the possibility of treating physical disorders through psychological processes. Hélène Michel-Wolfromm applied psychosomatic medicine to the field of gynecology and sexual problems experienced by women.

In the 1970s, Thure von Uexküll and his colleagues in Germany and elsewhere proposed a biosemiotic theory (the umwelt concept) that was widely influential as a theoretical framework for conceptualizing mind-body relations. This model shows that life is a meaning or functional system. Farzad Goli further explains in Biosemiotic Medicine (2016), how signs in the form of matter (e.g., atoms, molecules, cells), energy (e.g., electrical signals in nervous system), symbols (e.g., words, images, machine codes), and reflections (e.g., mindful moments, metacognition) can be interpreted and translated into each other.

Henri Laborit, one of the founders of modern neuropsychopharmacology, carried out experiments in the 1970s that showed that illness quickly occurred when there was inhibition of action in rats. Rats in exactly the same stressful situations but whom were not inhibited in their behavior (those who could flee or fight—even if fighting is completely ineffective) had no negative health consequences. He proposed that psychosomatic illnesses in humans largely have their source in the constraints that society puts on individuals in order to maintain hierarchical structures of dominance. The film My American Uncle, directed by Alain Resnais and influenced by Laborit, explores the relationship between self and society and the effects of the inhibition of action.

In February 2005, the Boston Syndromic Surveillance System detected an increase in young men seeking medical treatment for stroke. Most of them did not actually experience a stroke, but the largest number presented a day after Tedy Bruschi, a local sports figure, was hospitalized for a stroke. Presumably they began misinterpreting their own harmless symptoms, a group phenomenon now known as Tedy Bruschi syndrome.

Robert Adler is credited with coining the term Psychoneuroimmunology (PNI) to categorize a new field of study also known as mind-body medicine. The principles of mind-body medicine suggest that our mind and the emotional thoughts we produce have an incredible impact on our physiology, either positive or negative.

PNI integrates the mental/psychological, nervous, and immune system, and these systems are further linked together by ligands, which are hormones, neurotransmitters and peptides. PNI studies how every single cell in our body is in constant communication—how they are literally having a conversation and are responsible for 98% of all data transferred between the body and the brain.

Dr. Candace Pert, a professor and neuroscientist who discovered the opiate receptor, called this communication between our cells the ‘Molecules of Emotion' because they produce the feelings of bliss, hunger, anger, relaxation, or satiety. Dr. Pert maintains that our body is our subconscious mind, so what is going on in the subconscious mind is being played out by our body.

== See also ==
- Healing Words: Poetry and Medicine – 2008 documentary
- Medical students' disease – Condition in medical students
- Mirror box – Treatment for some kinds of pain
- Nocebo effect – Harmful effect from negative belief
- Placebo effect – Substance or treatment of no therapeutic value
- Placebo studies – Substance or treatment of no therapeutic value
- Psychoneuroimmunology – Area of study within psychosomatic medicine
- Psychotherapy – Clinically applied psychology for desired behavior change
- Psychosomatic Medicine – Medical journal
- Somatic symptom disorder – Excessive focus on distressing physical symptoms, also known as "somatoform disorder"
