= Sultanate of Bale =

Former sultanate in southeastern Ethiopia

The Sultanate of Bale was a large Muslim sultanate located in the Bale region of southern Ethiopia. It was the largest of the Muslim kingdoms in Ethiopia described by the Muslim geographers al-Umari and al-Makrizi. Along with other sultanates, including Dawaro, Arababni, Hadiya, Shirka, and Dara, Bale became part of the so-called confederation of Zeila. It corresponds roughly to the modern Bale Zone of the Oromia Region in Ethiopia.

== History ==
=== Background ===
Bale was first mentioned during the rule of the Zagwe dynasty, and was described as a "mysterious province" that bordered the Islamic sultanates and provinces of Dawaro and Sharkha in the north, Adal in the east and Hadiya in the west. Bale emerged sometime between the 11th and 13th centuries, shaped by Islamic influences introduced by traders and preachers. Islam provided the rulers with a framework for governing larger and more complex political entities by fostering ideological unity and granting access to international Islamic thought, which helped them rise above narrow, local loyalties. Additionally, Islam served as a form of international "passport," enabling traders, teachers, and preachers to live and travel freely throughout these states, from the port of Zeila on the northern Somali coast to Bale in the fertile highlands of southern Ethiopia.

=== Establishment ===
The history of the Muslim state of Bale is closely tied to the legacy of Sheikh Hussein, a prominent standard-bearer of Islam in Bale during the 11th century. A Somali scholar from Merca, Sheikh Hussein played a pivotal role in spreading Islam across the region. Revered as the most accomplished missionary saint in southern Ethiopia, he became the ultimate symbol of saintly virtues and baraka (spiritual blessing). Since the 13th century, his shrine in Bale has been a center for the diffusion of Islam and a rallying point for Muslims, predominantly Somalis and eastern Oromos, throughout southern Ethiopia.

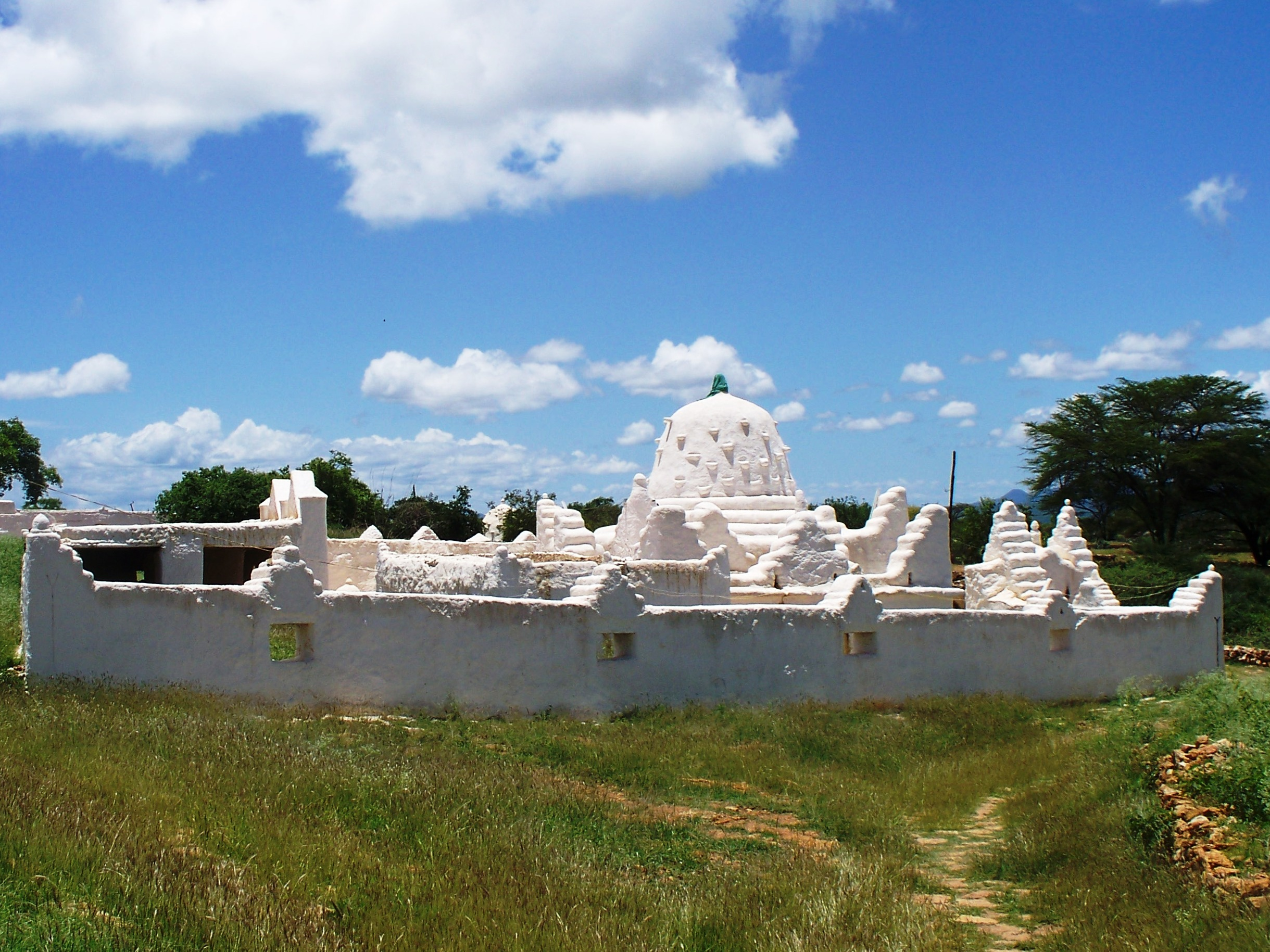
Shrine and tomb of Sheikh Hussein in Bale

According to al-Umari, Bale was among the largest of Ethiopia's Muslim provinces, spanning roughly twenty days journey by six—approximately 400 kilometers by 120 kilometers. Nestled in the southern highlands, Bale experienced higher rainfall and a cooler, more fertile climate than its neighboring territories. Despite this, its agricultural production, food, clothing, and social customs were similar to those of nearby Muslim lands. Due to its remote southern location, Bale's trade was less developed than that of neighboring regions. Coins were not in circulation as they were in Ifat, nor was hakuna used as in lands to the north. As a result, trade primarily relied on barter, with cattle, sheep, and cloth being the main goods exchanged. However, Bale appears to be famous for its cotton-cloth-weaving industry, and its foreign traders, which primarily included Arabs and Persians. Unlike nearby Muslim provinces, Bale's leadership was not held by a hereditary dynasty but rather by a man of humble origins—possibly the aforementioned 'Ali—who had gained the favor of 'Amda Seyon and received official investiture as ruler. The province’s military force included eighteen thousand cavalry and numerous infantry soldiers.

=== Fall of the Bale Sultanate ===
In 1332, Bale was conquered by the Christian king of the Ethiopian Empire, Amde Seyon. The subsequent expansion of Christian Ethiopia led to conflict between the neighboring Muslim polities and the Christian empire, and the borderland province soon became the epicenter of these conflicts. Ethiopian rule of Bale also provided an outpost to carry out attacks on neighboring states, such as Ifat and Adal. Due to its southernly position in the empire, Bale was under intense pressure from the neighboring Adal Sultanate. Despite its peripheral status, Bale remained under Ethiopian control well into the early 16th century when Emperor Na'od repulsed a raid by a Muslim leader named Adruh, this reign also witnessed the rebellion of a nobleman named Wanag Jan brother of Wasan Sagad, who converted to Islam and slaughtered many Christians but was eventually defeated. The province thus remained a part of the empire, testimony to its Christian affiliation can be seen in the remains of a rock hewn church near Goba. Of all the Muslim states of southern Ethiopia, it was Bale that appears to have played a defining role in the early history of the Oromo people. Historical Bale was the original homeland of the primeval Oromo groups, who practiced a mixed economy. It was also in Bale that the Oromo oral calendar and the qaalluu institution emerged, shaped by the influences of both Muslim and Christian ideas.

== Location ==
It bordered the sultanates of Dawaro and Makhzumi Dynasty in the north, Hadiya in the west, and Adal in the east and its core areas were located around the Shebelle River. However, the geopolitical borders of the sultanate are unclear - it is usually placed around the Wabe Shebelle river. Taddesse Tamrat locates Bale south of the Shebelle River, which separated the kingdom from Dawaro to the north and Adal to the northeast; Richard Pankhurst adds that its southern boundary was the Ganale Dorya River. Ulrich Braukämper, after discussing the evidence, states that this former dependency "occupied an area in the northeast of the province which later was named after it, between the mountain range of Urgoma and the eastern Wabi Bend." Another river that shaped the sultanate's borders was the Wabe River. Overall, borders of the Bale Sultanate corresponded to the modern districts of Goba, Sinana-Dinsho, Agarfa, Gasera and Goro.

== Demographics ==
The sultanate consisted of Cushitic speakers that was likely a part of the Hadiya-Sidama cluster of speakers that was also present in Hadiya. Richard Pankhurst claims that the sultanate was "inhabited by an animist Sidama people, some of whom had by the fourteenth century at least adopted Islam." The Sidama people claim to originate from Bale. The Futuh al-Habasha speaks of "sharifs and the Arabs who lived in Bale", which points to the Arab background of Bale and its population. However, there were Christian clans in Bale as well, such as Sabro, Fankal, Koiye, Daiyu and Fasil. While rulers of the sultanate of Bale were Muslims, the population of Bale consisted of adherents of indigenous religions as well as Christians, in addition to Muslims.
