= Bale (historical region) =

Historic state in Horn of Africa

Bale (Oromo: Baalee; Amharic: ባሌ Somali: Baale), also known as Bali, was a historical Muslim region located in the southeastern part of modern Ethiopia. It bordered the Dawaro to the north, Hadiya in the west, and Adal in the east and its core areas were located around the Shebelle River.

The borders of Bale during the medieval period are unclear — it is usually placed around the Wabe Shebelle river, another river that shaped its borders was the Wabe River. Overall, borders of historical Bale corresponded to the modern districts of Goba, Sinana, Dinsho, Agarfa, Gasera and Goro. In the 14th century it was located between Ifat and Solomonic tributary state of Hadiya. Taddesse Tamrat locates Bale south of the Shebelle River, which separated the kingdom from Dawaro to the north and Adal to the northeast; Richard Pankhurst adds that its southern boundary was the Ganale Dorya River. Ulrich Braukämper, after discussing the evidence, states that this former dependency "occupied an area in the northeast of the province which later was named after it, between the mountain range of Urgoma and the eastern Wabi Bend."

== History ==
Bale was first mentioned during the rule of the Zagwe dynasty, and was described as a "mysterious province" that bordered the Islamic sultanates and provinces of Dawaro and Sharkha in the north, Adal in the east and Hadiya in the west. There was no hereditary dynasty that ruled Bale, but Islam was present in the province, as shown by 13th century Arabic inscriptions found in Bale. According to oral traditions, Islam was brought to Bale by a Muslim scholar named Sheikh Hussein, of Somali origin migrated from Merca before settling in Bale sometime in the 12th or 13th century. Considered an isolated land, Bale was nevertheless known for its production of cotton, although its southern location limited its ability to trade. Along with other Muslim polities in the region, including Dawaro, Arababni, Hadiya, Shirka, and Dara, Bale became part of the so-called confederation of Zeila under the Sultanate of Shewa, however later in the centuries it became involved in a tug of war between the rising Christian Solomonic dynasty and Muslim states in the region. The historian Chihab al-Umari described its size as 20 days travel by six days travel, and its lands were more fertile and with a better climate than its Muslim neighbors. It had an army of 18,000 horsemen and "many" foot soldiers.

In 1332, Bale was conquered by the Christian king of the Ethiopian Empire, Amde Seyon. The subsequent expansion of Christian Ethiopia led to conflict between the neighboring Muslim polities and the Christian empire, and the borderland province soon became the epicenter of these conflicts. Ethiopian rule of Bale also provided an outpost to carry out attacks on neighboring states, such as Ifat and Adal. Due to its southernly position in the empire, Bale was under intense pressure from the neighboring Adal Sultanate, Adal was able to conquer Bale for a brief period in the early 15th century under Badlay ibn Sa'ad ad-Din, but Bale was retaken by Christian Ethiopia under the emperor Zara Yaqob shortly after. The governor of Bale used the title Hegano according to the Zara Yaqob chronicle. During the reign of emperor Baeda Maryam I, in the fifteenth century the governor of Bale held the title Garad.

Into the early 16th century Emperor Na'od repulsed a raid by an Adal leader named Adruh, this reign also witnessed the rebellion of a nobleman named Wanag Jan brother of Wasan Sagad, who converted to Islam and slaughtered many Christians but was eventually defeated. Following Na'od's defeat by Imam Mahfuz, the Adalites briefly controlled Fatagar, Dawaro and Bale until the reign of emperor Dawit II, who would recapture the territories for the Abyssinians.

Bale was the first territory in Ethiopia, that leader of Adal Ahmad ibn Ibrahim al-Ghazi had invaded during his conquest of Ethiopia. Prior to his main campaigns into the highlands, one of his first expeditions was a raid against Bale, which by then had largely become a Christian province. While in Bale, Adal writer of Futuh al-Habasa Arab Faqīh, reports that his men seized much loot, pillaged the province and "reduced it to cinders". The governor of Bale, upon learning that his province was being ravaged ordered all the inhabitants to assemble against the invaders, however the "sharifs and the Arabs who lived in Bale" welcomed the Imam and presented him with gifts. After defeating the governor, Ahmad left the province, taking with him a concubine named Hajirah. Despite this victory, Bale continued to remain unconquered and was heavily involved in the defense of other provinces. In Antokya, the Bale army under nobleman Addali ambushed a Adalite force, inflicting heavy losses. In response, the Imam made use of an imported cannon and a number of Arab mercenaries including skilled archers from Morocco, which easily put the Bale army to flight. By 1531, Bale was still unconquered and its people were largely unconverted. This prompted the Imam to send an army largely consisting of recent converts to subjugate the defiant province. Addali also mobilized his army for battle and what followed was one of the bloodiest battles of the war, the Battle of Bali. The two armies fought bravely and fiercely until Addali was killed. After this, the Imam ordered the victorious commander to take one fifth of the noblemen's wives and children and the rest to be given to his soldiers. The chronicler then reports that "All of the inhabitants of Bali, great and small, embraced Islam."

Bale soon fell under intense pressure from the Oromo expansion, according to Bahrey the Oromos began to invade Bale under the lubaship of Mudana gadaa (1530-1538). The Muslim governor of the province, Umar, moved to the northern parts of the province to avoid any confrontation with the Oromos, allowing them to occupy much of the southern and central parts of the province. Manuel de Almeida notes that the territory was occupied by the Oromo with little difficulty as the land was mostly flat lowland plains, which was ideal for a nomadic people to expand in. According to the Adalite chronicles, in 1583 the governor of Bale, Abbas b. Kabir Muhammad would assist Gasa Ibrahim II in becoming leader of the Imamate of Aussa. Although the Royal Chronicle of Emperor Susenyos reports that Dagano or Hegano referred to as Bale Garad had paid tribute to Emperor Yaqob, Braukämper concludes that "from the entirety of the historical situation that Ethiopia's claim to sovereignty later in the seventeenth century was purely theoretical."

The Islamization of the Oromo in Bale began in the 18th century, when according to oral traditions, Sheikh Muhammad Tilma Tiamo, came from Harar to Bale after having a dream in which Sheikh Hussien called him to propagate Islam to the people of Bale and revive the shrine of Sheikh Hussien. Sheikh Abbas, an ethnic Argobba, also arrived to the shrine after seeing Sheikh Hussien in a dream. Sheikh Muhammad and his descendants eventually arose as the leader of the shrine, while Sheikh Abbas and his descendants were left in a deputy position, but played a key role in the conversion of the locals to Islam. The Islamification of Bale was intensified after Emperor Yohannes IV harsh policy towards of Muslim of Ethiopia, which prompted many of them to flee to Bale. The emir that ruled Bale Abd-Shakur of the Emirate of Harar initiated a strategy of converting the local Oromos around Harar, he eventually commissioned the construction of a mosque in the region.

Bale was finally incorporated into Ethiopia during the conquests of Menelik II, prior to this Bale was a part of the Arsi country which Darge Sahle Selassie campaigned against. The Arsi were defeated in 1886 at the Battle of Azule, but Darge did not move into Bale until 1891. Despite the fierce resistance at Arsi, the people of Bale were quickly pacified with minimal resistance as the conquest was largely achieved through diplomatic means. Darge then established a new provincial headquarters at Goba and gave the governorship to his son, Ras Asfaw. The province was divided into four districts centered around a garrison town, Goba, Dodola, Ginir and Dolo, where Shewan Amhara officers (neftenya) were granted estates and the local Oromo and Somali pastoralists were turned into tenants and forced to pay tribute to them. It was placed as part of Hararghe until 1960 when the Haile Selassie regime created a separate province named Bale. According to Ulrich Braukämper, this new province created in the 20th century is not be conflated with the historical province which was minuscule and only comprised the north eastern part of the modern region. Ernesta Cerulli however states Bale's western confines included Lake Langano in the 1600s.
