= Guradamole, Oromia (woreda) =

District in Oromia Region, Ethiopia

Coordinates: 6°20′N 40°30′E

Guradamole is one of the woredas in the Oromia Region of Ethiopia. Part of the Bale Zone, Guradamole is bordered on the south by the Ganale Dorya River which separates it from the Borena Zone, on the southwest by Meda Welabu, on the west by Mennana Harena Buluk, on the northwest by Berbere, on the northeast by the Mena River which separates it from Goro

== Overview ==
The geography of this woreda is characterized by the relatively level plain of the central portion, with rugged terrain in the southern and northern parts. Mount Kondala is the highest point; other notable peaks include Mounts Barat, Shabby, Damolle, and Habrana. Rivers include the Dumel, Welmel and the Weyib. A survey of the land in this woreda shows that 18.7% is arable or cultivable (4.8% was under annual crops), 49.2% pasture, 26.8% forest or dense vegetation, and the remaining 5.3% is considered degraded, mountainous or otherwise unusable.

It is estimated that 60% of the total population of this woreda lead a nomadic lifestyle. Industry in the woreda consists of only one grain mill, although 3 retailers and one service provider were licensed in this woreda. Incense and gum resources existed, but had not been developed. There were 11 Farmers Associations with 5845 members and no Farmers Service Cooperatives. As of 1997, construction of a rural road in Guradamole was underway. About 1.8% of the total population has access to drinking water.

== Demographics ==
The 2007 national census reported a total population for this woreda of 28,961, of whom 14,370 were men and 14,591 were women; 1,269 or 4.38% of its population were urban dwellers. The majority of the inhabitants said they were Muslim, with 98.82% of the population reporting they observed this belief.

Based on figures published by the Central Statistical Agency in 2005, this woreda has an estimated total population of 26,271, of whom 13,171 are men and 13,100 are women; 608 or 2.31% of its population are urban dwellers, which is less than the Zone average of 13.5%. With an estimated area of 6,492.67 square kilometers, Guradamole has an estimated population density of 4 people per square kilometer, which is less than the Zone average of 27.

The 1994 national census reported a total population for this woreda of 19,015, of whom 9,522 were men and 9,493 women; 337 or 1.77% of its population were urban dwellers at the time. The two largest ethnic groups reported in Gurra damolle were the Oromo (90.08%), and the Somali (9.74%); all other ethnic groups made up 0.18% of the population. Oromiffa was spoken as a first language by 90.08%, and 9.71% spoke Amharic; the remaining 0.21% spoke all other primary languages reported. The majority of the inhabitants were Muslim, with 99.69% of the population having reported they practiced that belief.
