= Berbere (woreda) =

District in Oromia Region, Ethiopia

Coordinates: 6°40′N 40°10′E

Berbere is a woreda in Oromia Region, Ethiopia. Part of the Bale Zone, Berbere is bordered on the south by Mennana Harena Buluk, on the northwest by Goba, on the north by Sinanana Dinsho, on the northeast by Goro, and on the east by Guradamole; the Mena River separates it from Shinanana Dinsho and Goro. The administrative center of the woreda is Haro Dumal.

== Overview ==
This woreda is characterized by undulating highlands in the north and lowlands in the south. Mount Wereba is the highest point; other prominent peaks include Mount Siru. Rivers include the Dumale, Doya, Hawas and Hambala, which are tributaries of the Ganale Dorya River. A survey of the land in this woreda shows that 20.5% is arable (4.3% was under cultivation), 36.4% pasture, 41.7% forest or heavy vegetation cover, and the remaining 1.4% is considered swampy, degraded or otherwise unusable. Khat, peppers, fruits and vegetables are important cash crops. Coffee is also an important cash crop; over 5,000 hectares are planted with it.

At the time of the Oromia Regional report, there was no industry in this woreda. There were 12 Farmers Associations with 4491 members but no Farmers Service Cooperatives. As of 1997, a rural road was under construction to connect Berbere with the neighboring Goro woreda. About 3.7% of the total population has access to drinking water.

This woreda was selected by the Ministry of Agriculture and Rural Development in 2003 as one of several areas for voluntary resettlement for farmers from overpopulated areas. Together with Gaserana Gololcha and Meda Welabu, Berbere became the new home for a total of 5219 heads of households and 19,758 family members.

== Demographics ==
The 2007 national census reported a total population for this woreda of 90,642, of whom 46,445 were men and 44,197 were women; 5,650 or 6.23% of its population were urban dwellers. The majority of the inhabitants said they were Muslim, with 89.19% of the population reporting they observed this belief, while 10.44% of the population practiced Ethiopian Orthodox Christianity.

Based on figures published by the Central Statistical Agency in 2005, this woreda has an estimated total population of 53,547, of whom 26,696 are men and 26,851 are women; 2,104 or 3.93% of its population are urban dwellers, which is less than the Zone average of 13.5%. With an estimated area of 1,348.28 square kilometers, Berbere has an estimated population density of 39.7 people per square kilometer, which is greater than the Zone average of 27.

The 1994 national census reported a total population for this woreda of 38,617, of whom 19,454 were men and 19,163 women; 1,174 or 3.04% of its population were urban dwellers at the time. The three largest ethnic groups reported in Berbere were Oromo (80.28%), Somali (11.99%), and Amhara (4.4%); all other ethnic groups made up 3.33% of the population. Oromiffa was spoken as a first language by 82.74%, 11.27% spoke Somali, and 5.9% spoke Amharic; the remaining 0.09% spoke all other primary languages reported. The majority of the inhabitants were Muslim, with 91.31% of the population having reported they practiced that belief, while 8.6% of the population said they professed Ethiopian Orthodox Christianity.
