= Battle of Bali =

1532 battle of Ethiopia–Adal War

- Part of the Ethiopian–Adal War
Date	July 1532
Location	Zallah, Bali, Ethiopian Empire
Result	Adalite victory
Territorial changes	Bali annexed by Adal

Belligerents
Adal Sultanate	Ethiopian Empire

Commanders and leaders
(Adal Sultanate) Abbas ibn Abogn (Adal Sultanate) Abu Bakr Qecchin	(Ethiopian Empire) Addalih †

Strength
3,250	3,500

Casualties and losses
500 killed 600 wounded	2,000 killed 200 captured

The Battle of Bali was fought in 1532 between Adalite forces under Vizier Addoli and the Abyssinian army under Addalih, Governor of Bali.

== Prelude ==
After the Adalites subjugated and islamized the Dawaro region under the command of Hussain Al-Gaturi, Imam Ahmad ibn Ibrahim sent order for Vizier Addoli, the Second-in-command of the Dawaro expedition, to go down to Bali and conquer it. Upon reaching Bali and that the Abyssinian governor of Bali, Addalih, was camped in the town of Zallah on the bank of the Shebelle River, Addoli sent him a message ordering him to surrender and pay the Jizya. Addalih refused stating he was unimpressed with the small size of Addoli's army and ordered his men to bring their families with them in order to prevent fleeing. The two armies met at Zallah on Dhu'l-Hijja 938 AH which corresponds to July or August 1532.

== Battle ==
The two armies clashed fiercely with the Adalites having the upper hand until Addalih was flung from his horse by a Somali cavalryman and then beheaded. Seeing the death of their commander the Abyssinian forces broke and fled. As they fled the Adalites slew innumerable fleeing Abyssinian soldiers and captured all their belongings. The Muslim women rode behind their menfolk on mules and helped to capture prisoners. By the end of the battle each woman would boast that they had captured 5 Abyssinian soldiers.

== Aftermath ==
The Muslim chronicler notes that following the battle the terrain was covered with the dead and blood flowed like water on the ground. Innumerable Abyssinian infantrymen were killed along with 3,000 cavalrymen, and 100 Azmachs. 100 Azmachs were also captured and thereafter summarily executed by the victorious Adalites. On the Muslim side however only 2 infantrymen were killed. Addoli took the wife of Addalih as his concubine and on orders from Imam Ahmad hanged an apostate named Naqdiyah outside the gates of Zallah. The Abyssinian womenfolk were divided up among the Adalites as concubines. After battle the entire of Bali was brought to heel and all of the inhabitants embraced Islam. According to oral tradition, Ahmed ibn Ibrahim's troops overwhelmed Bali, destroyed the churches, killed many Christians, and forced those who escaped from the massacre to look for refuge in caves and forests. Imam invaded Bali from the region of Galb, and the Christian forces under Asmach Degelhan.
