= Harena Buluk =

Administrative division of Ethiopia

Harena Buluk is one of the woredas in the Oromia Region of Ethiopia. It was part of former Menna Angetu woreda. It is part of the Bale Zone. Harena Buluk woreda is bordered on the south by Meda Welabu, on the north by Goba, on the west by Nensebo, on the northwest by Adaba, and on the east by Delo Menna, Oromia (woreda). The administrative center for the woreda is Angetu.

== Demographics ==
The 2007 national census reported a total population for this woreda of 81,497, of whom 41,382 were men and 40,115 were women; 4,894 or 6.01% of its population were urban dwellers. The majority of the inhabitants said they were Muslim, with 92.27% of the population reporting they observed this belief, while 5.06% of the population were Protestant and 2.08% practiced Ethiopian Orthodox Christianity.

Bale Mountains contain four distinct ecoregions of the Afromontane ecozone:

Northern plains Bush and woodlands Ethiopian montane grasslands and woodlands — on the central Sanetti Plateau, with an average elevation of over 4,000 metres (13,000 ft) Ethiopian montane forests — in the higher elevation southern Harenna Forest areas. Flora and fauna

Giant forest hogs in the Harenna Forest, Bale Mountains NP, Ethiopia The Harenna Forest is known for its native plants, mammals, amphibians and birds, including many endemic species. [2] One such endemic species is the tree Maytenus harenensis, which is also classified by the IUCN as vulnerable due to the threat of logging.[3]

The Harenna Forest was once habitat to packs of the endangered painted hunting dog, Lycaon pictus. However, the presence of this canid is now in question here due to the population pressures of expanding human presence.[4] The central Sanetti Plateau is home to the largest population of the rare and endangered Ethiopian wolf.
