= Abbas ibn Abogn =

16th century Imam and General of the Adal Sultanate

Wazir Abbas ibn Abogn

Grand Vizier of the Adal Sultanate
- In office 1535–1545
- Preceded by: Vizier Addoli

Personal details
- Born: c. 1500s
- Died: 1545
- Children: Talha ibn Abbas

Military service
- Allegiance: Adal Sultanate
- Battles/wars: Ethiopian–Adal War

Abbas ibn Abogn ibn Ibrahim (Arabic: عباس بن ابون بن إبراهيم) also known as Wazir Abbas was an Adalite general who became Grand Vizier of the Adal Sultanate in 1535. The nephew of Ahmed Gurey, he led the Adalite conquest of Medri Bahri and was briefly the Bahr Negash. He was also the father of the Sultan Talha ibn Abbas.

== Biography ==
Abbas was born the son of Abogn ibn Ibrahim in the city of Hubat, the elder brother of Imam Ahmad ibn Ibrahim al-Ghazi. His father died in one of Mahfuz’s annual raids into Ethiopian Empire at the hands of Abyssinian general Wasan Sagad. Whether Abbas participated in the earlier battles of the Ethiopian-Adal War is unclear.

Abbas took part in the subjugation of the Lasta and Bete Amhara provinces as a minor commander and is mentioned to have taken part in a failed siege of Amba Geshen under Garad Matan during 1531. Soon afterwards he was sent along with another commander to end Abyssinian resistance in the southern regions of Dawaro, Ifat and Bali which had yet to be fully Islamized. Despite his young age Abbas proved an adept commander and managed to rout an Abyssinian Azmach at Ifat securing the province. Abbas was then subjugated to the command of Hussain Al Gaturi who the Imam had placed as the commander chief of the southern provinces. Dawaro was then fully placed under Adalite control. After this victory The Imam ordered Wazir Addoli along with Abbas to crush the last vestiges of Christian control in Bali. Abbas commanded the Adalite right wing during the decisive Battle of Bali.

In 1535 Vizier Addoli sent Abbas into the province of Seraye to annex Medri Bahri into Adal. Abbas then adopted the title of Bahr Negash and was welcomed by the local inhabitants. A local Muslim convert named Tedros was then giving lordship of Saraye but was however slain by Tafsā Le’ul, an Azmach loyal to Lebna Dengel. Seeing his struggles in Seraye, Addoli came to reinforce his beleaguered troops but was lead into an ambush by Tafsā Le’ul and killed. Tafsā Le’ul then attempted to attack Abbas’ troops in Saraye however Abbas managed to defeat him in the ensuing battle. Tafsā Le’ul along with all his men were killed. The heads of him and his sons were then sent to the Imam in revenge for the death of Addoli. After the battle the Imam promoted Abbas to Grand Vizier replacing Addoli and placing the entirety of Medri Bahri under his command. He was also given the frontier territory of Taka near modern-day Kassala as a fief.

== Death ==
After the Imam's death at the Battle of Wayna Daga, Abbas was governing Ifat, Fatagar, Bali and Dawaro. He managed to secure these provinces for Adal until 1545 when Gelawdewos embarked on expedition to Wej province. Abbas raced to Wej in order to intercept but was however led into a trap there. In the ensuing battle the outnumbered Abbas was slain along with many of his troops. In 1579 his son, Talha ibn Abbas, became Sultan of Adal in part due to his lineage.
