= Gololcha (Bale) =

Administrative division of Ethiopia

Coordinates: 7°20′N 40°15′E

Gololcha is one of the woredas in the Oromia Region of Ethiopia. It was part of former Gaserana Gololcha woreda what was divided for Gadera and Gololcha woredas. Part of the Bale Zone, Gaserana Gololcha is bordered on the south by Ginir, on the southwest by Sinanana Dinsho, on the west by Agarfa, on the north by the Shebelle River which separates it from the Arsi Zone, on the northeast by Legehida, and on the east by Seweyna. The administrative center for the woreda is Jara.

== Overview ==
Mount Arab Lij is the highest point in this woreda; another notable peak is Mount Kubayu. Perennial rivers include the Weyib and Gololcha Rivers. A survey of the land in this woreda shows that 31.7% is arable or cultivable, 28% pasture, 35.7% forest, and the remaining 4.6% is considered swampy, mountainous or otherwise unusable. Notable landmarks in this woreda include Dirre Shek Hussen with its 11th-century mosque. Khat and pepper are important cash crops. Coffee is also an important cash crop; between 2,000 and 5,000 hectares are planted with it.

Industry in the woreda includes 15 grain mills and 5 edible oil mills employing 47 people, as well as 66 wholesalers 179 retailers and 54 service providers. There were 39 Farmers Associations with 20,384 members and 9 Farmers Service Cooperatives with 3,264 members. Gaserana Gololcha has 153 kilometers of all-weather road, for an average of road density of 48.7 kilometers per 1000 square kilometers. About 26.8% of the total population has access to drinking water.

This woreda was selected by the Ministry of Agriculture and Rural Development in 2003 as one of several areas for voluntary resettlement for farmers from overpopulated areas. Together with Berbere and Meda Welabu, Gaserana Gololcha became the new home for a total of 5219 heads of households and 19,758 family members.

== Demographics ==
The 2007 national census reported a total population for this woreda of 100,809, of whom 50,923 were men and 49,886 were women; 5,804 or 5.76% of its population were urban dwellers. The majority of the inhabitants said they were Muslim, with 73.95% of the population reporting they observed this belief, while 25.68% of the population practised Ethiopian Orthodox Christianity.

Based on figures published by the Central Statistical Agency in 2005, this woreda has an estimated total population of 166,795, of whom 83,748 are men and 83,047 are women; 11,269 or 6.76% of its population are urban dwellers, which is less than the Zone average of 13.5%. With an estimated area of 3,138.75 square kilometers, Gaserana Gololcha has an estimated population density of 53.1 people per square kilometer, which is greater than the Zone average of 27.

The 1994 national census reported a total population for this woreda of 119,499, of whom 59,757 were men and 59,742 women; 6,301 or 5.27% of its population were urban dwellers at the time. The two largest ethnic groups reported in Gaserana Gololcha were the Oromo (91.36%), and the Amhara (8.18%); all other ethnic groups made up 0.46% of the population. Oromiffa was spoken as a first language by 88.36%, and 9.29% spoke Amharic; the remaining 2.35% spoke all other primary languages reported. The majority of the inhabitants were Muslim, with 69.79% of the population having reported they practiced that belief, while 30.02% of the population said they professed Ethiopian Orthodox Christianity.
