= Circassian–Golden Horde War (1319–1327) =

Circassian Uprising against Golden Horde 1319-1327

Circassian-Golden Horde War (1319–1327)
- Part of the Mongol invasions
Date	1319–1327
Location	Circassia, North Caucasus
Result	Circassian victory: Circassia remains independent.
Territorial changes	Weakening of Golden Horde's control over the Caucasus

Belligerents
Golden Horde	Zichia

Commanders and leaders
Uzbek Khan; Talish; Hasan †	Circassian Leaders

The Circassian–Golden Horde War (1319–1327) was a series of military engagements between the Mongol-led Golden Horde and the Circassians (Zichia). During this period, the Golden Horde, under Uzbek Khan, attempted to suppress Circassian independence, but the local population mounted significant resistance. Several battles were fought in the region, but the Circassians successfully maintained their autonomy.

== Prelude ==
=== Mongol Invasions and the North Caucasus ===
The Mongol invasions had a profound impact on the ethnic and political landscape of the North Caucasus. By the 10th century, the Alans dominated the region, conducting raids against the Circassians, as noted by Constantine VII Porphyrogenitus and the Arab historian Al-Masudi. Their dominance was facilitated by the political fragmentation of the Circassians, who were divided into multiple tribes, while the Alans were united under a central ruler. However, Alanian unity gradually weakened, and by the 13th century, the region descended into feudal anarchy, as recorded by Hungarian Dominican missionaries.

The Mongol advance in the 13th century further fragmented the region. According to the Georgian Chronicles Hundred Years Chronicle and Eristavs’ Memorial, part of the Alan population fled to Georgia, settling in the province of Dvaleti. Another group was deported to China, where they formed the Alan Guard of the Yuan dynasty. A third group was resettled across the Golden Horde, from the Danube to the Volga. Those who remained in the Caucasus retreated into the mountains, where they intermingled with local highland populations, giving rise to the Ossetians.

Contemporary Chinese sources, such as the Menu’er Shiji, referred to the Circassians as "Tuerge". The Golden Horde waged prolonged campaigns against the Circassians, as described by the Mamluk chronicler Al-Umari (Note: «Они (черкесы, аланы), — пишет Эль-Омари, — не в силах сопротивляться султану этих стран (т. е. Золотой Орды), и потому (обходятся) с ними как подданные его, хотя у них и есть (свои) цари. Если они обращались к нему с повиновением, подарками и приношениями, то он оставлял их в покое, в противном же случае делал на них грабительские набеги и стеснял их осадами»). He noted that Circassians often raided Kipchak lands, capturing and selling their children to Muslim markets.

Following the decline of the Golden Horde in the late 14th and 15th centuries, caused by the Great Troubles and Timur's invasions, the Circassians expanded into the political vacuum, settling in areas previously under Mongol control.

In the early 14th century, the Golden Horde, having consolidated power in the north Caucasus, focused on expanding its influence southward, including into Circassia. However, the Circassians, known for their guerrilla tactics and mountainous terrain, provided a strong resistance to Mongol domination. By the time of Uzbek Khan’s reign, relations between the Horde and the Circassians had deteriorated, leading to a series of campaigns against them.

== Golden Horde Campaigns ==
Between 1319 and 1327, the Golden Horde launched several military campaigns to subdue the Circassians. These conflicts were marked by smaller skirmishes and raids, as the Mongols attempted to extend their influence over the region. Despite suffering setbacks and casualties, the Golden Horde was unable to fully pacify the Circassians, who retreated to their mountain strongholds and continued to resist Mongol rule.

== Long-term Effects ==
The conflict ultimately did not halt the growth of Circassian power in the region. By the end of the campaigns in 1327, the Circassians retained their independence and continued to thrive in the mountainous terrain of the Caucasus. The Golden Horde, on the other hand, began to lose its grip on the Caucasian territories as its internal instability grew. The events also contributed to the development of a more independent and militarized Circassian society.

== See also ==
- Mongol invasions of Durdzuketi
- Mongol invasions of Georgia
