= Raytu =

Rayitu is Woredas in East Baale Zone

Coordinates: 6°50′N 41°15′E

Rayitu is one of the Districts in the Oromia Region of Ethiopia. Located in East Bale zone or Eastern part of the Bale Zone, Rayitu is bordered on the south by the Somali Region, on the west by Ginir, and on the north and east by Seweyna; the Gestro River (or Weyib River) defines the southwest boundary. Towns in Raytu include Dhedecha Bela Town.

== Overview ==
The geography of this woreda consists of mountainous terrain along the northern and southern edges, while the remainder is dominated by a flat plain. High points include Mount Elwak. Perennial rivers include the Shabelle, Weyib, and Dinikte. A survey of the land in this woreda shows that 17% is arable (15% was under annual crops), 39% pasture, 37% forest or heavy vegetation, and the remaining 7% is considered swampy, mountainous or otherwise unusable. Teff, corn and sorghum are important local crops. However raising livestock is a more important source of food and income, which include in order of importance shoats, camels and cattle. Rayitu is a chronically food insecure woreda, and food aid is needed an average of five to six months in an average year.

Industry in the woreda consists of a few small-scale establishments, as well as some retailers and service providers. There were 12 Farmers Associations with 6,273 members and 3 Farmers Service Cooperatives. Rayitu has 52 kilometers of dry-weather road, for an average road density of 0.28 kilometers per 1000 square kilometers. About 7% of the total population has access to drinking water.

== Demographics ==
The 2007 national census reported a total population for this woreda of 33,169, of whom 16,876 were men and 16,293 were women; 3,204 or 9.66% of its population were urban dwellers. The majority of the inhabitants said they were Muslim, with 98.47% of the population reporting they observed this belief, while 1.2% of the population practised Ethiopian Orthodox Christianity.

Based on figures published by the Central Statistical Agency in 2005, this woreda has an estimated total population of 43,222, of whom 20,788 were males and 22,434 were females; 2,409 or 5.57% of its population are urban dwellers, which is less than the Zone average of 13.5%. With an estimated area of 7,055.22 square kilometers, Raytu has an estimated population density of 6.1 people per square kilometer, which is less than the Zone average of 27.

The 1994 national census reported a total population for this woreda of 31,056, of whom 16,182 were men and 14,874 women; 1,343 or 4.32% of its population were urban dwellers at the time. The two largest ethnic groups reported in Raytu were the Oromo (91.25%), and the Somali (8.47%); all other ethnic groups made up 0.28% of the population. Oromiffa was spoken as a first language by 89.34%, and 10.35% spoke Somali; the remaining 0.31% spoke all other primary languages reported. The majority of the inhabitants were Muslim, with 99.56% of the population reporting they practiced that belief.
