= Goro, Oromia (woreda) =

District in Oromia Region, Ethiopia

Coordinates: 6°45′N 40°35′E

Goro is one of the woredas in the Oromia Region of Ethiopia. It shares the same name as the administrative center of the woreda, Goro. Part of the Bale Zone, Goro is bordered on the southwest by Guradamole, on the west by Berbere, on the northwest by Sinanana Dinsho, on the northeast by Ginir, and on the southeast by the Somali Region; it is separated from Guradamole and Berbere by the Gestro River (or Weyib River). Other towns in this woreda include Meliyu. Dawe Kachen woreda was separated from Goro.

== Overview ==
Almost three-fourths of this woreda is covered by plains, and the rest are considered hilly or rugged. Mount Holachis is the highest point; other important peaks include Mounts Dadimos and Farra. Perennial rivers include the Weyib and the Mena, which are lined by forest. A survey of the land in this woreda shows that 17.7% is arable (5.9% was under cultivation), 38% pasture, 39.3% forest or heavy vegetation, and the remaining 5.3% is considered swampy, mountainous or otherwise unusable. 18.16 square kilometers of forest are part of the Goro Bale State Forest. Notable landmarks in this woreda include the Sof Omar Caves. Sugar cane, oil seeds, spices and vegetables are important cash crops.

Industry in the woreda includes 14 grain mills and 4 edible oil mills employing 44 people, as well as 24 wholesalers, 90 retailers and 29 service providers. There were 35 Farmers Associations with 15,412 members and 7 Farmers Service Cooperatives with 3548 members. Goro has 129 kilometers of all-weather road and as of 1997 two more roads under construction, for an average of road density of 36.8 kilometers per 1000 square kilometers. About 25% of the total population has access to drinking water.

== Demographics ==
The 2007 national census reported a total population for this woreda of 83,106, of whom 42,501 were men and 40,605 were women; 8,531 or 10.27% of its population were urban dwellers. The majority of the inhabitants said they were Muslim, with 81.23% of the population reporting they observed this belief, while 18.43% of the population practiced Ethiopian Orthodox Christianity.

Based on figures published by the Central Statistical Agency in 2005, this woreda has an estimated total population of 99,724, of whom 50,517 are men and 49,207 are women; 7,833 or 7.85% of its population are urban dwellers, which is less than the Zone average of 13.5%. With an estimated area of 3,503.29 square kilometers, Goro has an estimated population density of 28.5 people per square kilometer, which is about the same as the Zone average of 27.

The 1994 national census reported a total population for this woreda of 71,256, of whom 35,295 were men and 35,961 women; 4,379 or 6.15% of its population were urban dwellers at the time. The two largest ethnic groups reported in Goro were the Oromo (89.45%), and the Amhara (9.8%); all other ethnic groups made up 0.75% of the population. Oromiffa was spoken as a first language by 97.29%, and 2.41% spoke Amharic; the remaining 0.3% spoke all other primary languages reported. The majority of the inhabitants were Muslim, with 92.03% of the population having reported they practiced that belief, while 7.72% of the population said they professed Ethiopian Orthodox Christianity.
