= Battle of Waj =

1544 battle in southern Ethiopia

- Part of the aftermath of the Ethiopian–Adal War
Date	October 1544 (Note: The date is taken from a note in Gebreyes Beyene's translation of the chronicle and from Chekroun and Hirsch; Aregay, however, places Abbas's offensive in 1545. See Date.)
Location	Waj (Wäǧ), Ethiopian Empire
Result	Ethiopian victory
Territorial changes	End of the rule of Abbas in Bali, Fatagar and Dawaro

Belligerents
Ethiopian Empire	Muslim forces of Wazir Abbas

Commanders and leaders
Gelawdewos	Wazir Abbas (executed)

Strength
Unknown	Unknown (smaller than the emperor's army, according to Aregay)

Casualties and losses
Unknown	Abbas and his commanders killed; army largely destroyed

The Battle of Waj (also spelled Wej or Wäǧ) was fought in October 1544 between the army of the Ethiopian emperor Gelawdewos and the Muslim forces of Wazir Abbas in the province of Waj, in southern Ethiopia. Abbas, a nephew of Imam Ahmad ibn Ibrahim al-Ghazi, had taken control of Bali, Fatagar and Dawaro after Ahmad was killed at the Battle of Wayna Daga in 1543. When Gelawdewos marched into Waj, Abbas left his territory to confront him. According to the royal chronicle of Gelawdewos, Abbas and his commanders were killed and his army was destroyed.

The defeat ended Abbas's attempt to preserve Ahmad's conquests in the south-east of the empire. Modern historians describe a swift decline of Adal power in Dawaro and Fatagar and an exodus of Muslims from Bali and Dawaro, after which Gelawdewos moved his court to Dawaro to guard against renewed invasion. The battle is known mainly from the chronicle of Gelawdewos's reign, which, according to Chekroun and Hirsch, is the sole source on what became of the Muslim army after Ahmad's death.

== Background ==
=== Ahmad's conquests and death ===
From 1529 to 1543, the jihad led by Imam Ahmad ibn Ibrahim al-Ghazi brought the Christian kingdom close to collapse, according to the introduction to the standard translation of Gelawdewos's chronicle. Waj was one of the first of the south-western provinces to be drawn into the invasion. Gelawdewos succeeded his father Lebna Dengel in 1540 at about the age of eighteen. A Portuguese contingent of 400 men under Cristóvão da Gama arrived in 1541 to support him; after it was defeated at the Battle of Wofla in August 1542, the survivors joined Gelawdewos's army, and in 1543 Ahmad was killed at Wayna Daga.

According to the chronicle, the Christian reconquest of the former kingdom then took less than two years, although Chekroun and Hirsch point out that the collapse of Muslim territorial control is otherwise undocumented. Part of Ahmad's army fled to the Muslim territories that had existed before the conquest, and the rest went over to the Christian side. Aregay writes that Gelawdewos had in effect proclaimed a general amnesty and that many of those who had converted to Islam during the invasion returned to their former faith.

=== Wazir Abbas ===
Abbas (ʿAbbās b. Abūn b. Ibrāhīm) was a nephew of Imam Ahmad and one of his chief commanders. According to the annotations to the translation of the chronicle, he fought in many battles from 1531, became governor of Seraye after the defeat of its previous governor, Tasfa Le'ul, and was later given the title wazir (vizier) by the Imam in recognition of his military success. By the time of Ahmad's death he was second in command of the Muslim army. The chronicle already names him as an opponent early in Gelawdewos's reign, when two Muslim armies attacked the king on the road: Gelawdewos won the first encounter, but Abbas, whom the text calls the chief of the army, then won a victory of his own.

=== Waj ===
Waj (Wäǧ) was a fertile province of the Christian kingdom in the Rift Valley region. Aregay places Lake Zway, and perhaps Lake Shala, within it, with most of the province lying west of the lakes. He suggests that its population was probably Amhara and Maya and that Christianity seems to have predominated, noting that the emperors Baeda Maryam and Gelawdewos both held court there. The editor of the standard translation of the chronicle, drawing on the Encyclopaedia Aethiopica, describes it instead as a district south of the Mugär river, between Fatagar and Dawaro.

== Prelude ==
After Ahmad's death Abbas took control of Bali, Fatagar and Dawaro, provinces that had belonged to the Christian kingdom before the invasion and were rich agricultural land. The chronicle says that he ruled the Muslims living there, and Aregay writes that he declared himself their king. Abir describes the result as a realm of his own, made up of Dawaro, Bali and Fatagar, around the Rift Valley lakes. Chekroun and Hirsch say that he tried to take over Ahmad's role and intended to recover all the territory Ahmad had conquered.

Aregay regards it as unclear who the Muslims under Abbas were. He argues that they are unlikely to have been survivors of Ahmad's army, many of whom had returned to Christianity, and reads Abbas's break with the sultan at Harar as a sign that they were self-sufficient and felt that Harar paid little attention to their welfare. Elsewhere he writes that the unity Ahmad had achieved was destroyed once Abbas made himself independent of Harar.

The chronicle portrays Abbas as arrogant. It says that he boasted of setting his throne above the stars, in words drawn from the Book of Isaiah, invaded provinces close to the king, and spoke against the king, God and the Church. Pankhurst, citing William Conzelman's 1895 edition of the chronicle, writes that after the Imam's defeat and death Abbas launched a fierce attack on a number of Christian towns.

Gelawdewos, meanwhile, had built a winter palace at Agay, near Mugär. The chronicle says that he was not alarmed by Abbas's threats and waited through the three months of the rainy season, a time when, as the editor notes, military campaigns were not conducted. Aregay observes that, despite the confidence his army had gained from the victory over Ahmad, Gelawdewos was unusually hesitant about attacking Abbas in Dawaro.

== Battle ==
It was during the second month of the Ethiopian year that Gelawdewos came to Waj after a long march. On hearing about this, Abbas vacated his territories and went to meet him, accompanied by his chiefs and soldiers. According to the translator, the campaign took place in October 1544. Aregay explains Abbas's actions as a strategy to stop the emperor in case he marched into Bali and Dawaro, and as an act of desperation to save the Muslims of these provinces, not a miscalculation of his own power. In his account, Abbas's forces were fewer in number, and many of the able commanders and horsemen who had served Ahmad had already been killed in earlier battles.

The chronicle describes the encounter in biblical terms, from the king's arrival in Waj to the fall of Abbas and his commanders:

King Gälawdewos arrived in the land of Wäǧ after many journeys. When he heard this, Wazir Abbas set out from the land that he inhabited with all his chiefs and his troops rushing out like a furious dog in a hurry to bite and exultation blowing the horn like a strong horse. But King Gälawdewos was waiting to receive him calmly as the bridegroom is used to receive. In fact, his steadfast heart was solidly trusted to God, he was never disturbed for ever until he saw in his enemies. Their confrontation took place in the day at which God, be praised his name, decided. And He gave a crown for King Gälawdewos to win and he went out and he won. Abbas and the whole of his commanders fell by the iron (sword).

— Chronicle of King Gelawdewos

The account is brief and gives no figures and almost no tactical detail. It says that Gelawdewos waited for the enemy calmly, likening his composure to that of a bridegroom, and that the encounter took place on the day God decided. Abbas and all his commanders were killed, and, in the chronicle's imagery, birds gathered to feed on the dead; those who escaped the slaughter were hunted down and killed by anyone who found them. Pankhurst, summarising the chronicle, writes that Gelawdewos was entirely victorious and that the surviving followers of Abbas were killed by the local population.

== Aftermath ==
The death of Abbas ended his rule in the south-east. Chekroun and Hirsch state that Gelawdewos killed Abbas and recovered the three provinces and Hadiyya, and that two short Muslim attempts to retake Dawaro failed. Pankhurst describes a swift decline of Adal power in both Fatagar and Dawaro. Abir notes that Gelawdewos needed several years to impose his authority in the south, and that by destroying local power-holders he unintentionally made room for Oromo expansion. (Note: The sources employ the exonym "Galla" for the Oromo.)

Aregay describes the immediate consequences. The deaths of Abbas and many of his soldiers were followed by an exodus of Muslims from Bali and Dawaro, and the crowding of refugees into emirates occupied by Afar pastoralists heightened tensions among Muslims and between Muslims and Christians. Gelawdewos had to move his court into Dawaro to prevent a new invasion of the highlands, and he set about rebuilding the military defences that had collapsed during the invasion, reviving some of the old regiments. In Aregay's analysis, the contest between Muslim efforts to regain Ahmad's conquests and Gelawdewos's resolve to prevent it left Bali open to occupation by the Oromo.

The chronicle says that Gelawdewos then set up his throne and royal palace at a place called Agraro in Dawaro and spent three years in the region fighting the Hadiyya and the Oromo. It later describes campaigns into the Muslim territories, the first led by the army commander Fanu'el and the second, in 1549–1550, by the king himself; Chekroun and Hirsch say that the second seems to have devastated the province of Adal, killed its reigning sultan and led to the pursuit of a regional leader named Nur. (Note: The chronicle also describes the capture of a "young Abbas" in this later campaign (§ 85); the index in the translation lists him separately from the vizier, who had died years before.)

Waj itself became the centre of royal government. The translator notes that the king's first fixed capital was established there in 1549, and Abir writes that from about 1549 until Gelawdewos's death in 1559 the royal army was almost always at Waj.

== Date and sources ==
=== Date ===
The chronicle names the month of the campaign but not the year. The translator's note gives October 1544, and Chekroun and Hirsch likewise place the death of Abbas as early as October 1544, about a year and a half after Ahmad's death. Aregay, however, dates Abbas's offensive to 1545. A note on an earlier chapter of the chronicle gives two possible dates for the end of the year then being described, 29 August 1543 or 28 August 1544.

=== Sources ===
The main source is the royal chronicle of Gelawdewos, which according to its colophon was finished in March 1561, about two years after the death of the king. The translator considers this chronicle an apologetic work in favour of the king, and its description of the battle is short and framed largely in biblical imagery. Both Pankhurst and Aregay cite William Conzelman's 1895 edition for these events.

Two members of the Portuguese expedition, Miguel de Castanhoso and João Bermudes, wrote accounts of their time in Ethiopia. Aregay notes that Bermudes's narrative of events after 1545 does not correspond to the chronicle's: it says that after the death of Abbas the emperor gave Dawaro and Bali to the Portuguese captain Ayres Dias and stayed at Waj himself, and it never mentions the Muslim incursions into Dawaro that the chronicle describes. Abir regards Bermudes's account as biased and unreliable.

== See also ==
- Ethiopian–Adal War
- Battle of Wayna Daga
- Gelawdewos
- Abbas ibn Abogn

== Bibliography ==
=== Primary source ===
- Gebreyes Beyene, Solomon (2019). Chronicle of King Gälawdewos (1540–1559). Corpus Scriptorum Christianorum Orientalium. Vol. 668. Scriptores Aethiopici 117; English translation. Leuven: Peeters. ISBN 978-90-429-3665-2.

=== Secondary sources ===
- Abir, Mordechai (1980). Ethiopia and the Red Sea: The Rise and Decline of the Solomonic Dynasty and Muslim–European Rivalry in the Region. London: Frank Cass.
- Chekroun, Amélie; Hirsch, Bertrand (2020). "The Muslim-Christian Wars and the Oromo Expansion: Transformations at the End of the Middle Ages (c. 1500–c. 1560)". In Kelly, Samantha (ed.). A Companion to Medieval Ethiopia and Eritrea. Leiden and Boston: Brill. pp. 454–476. ISBN 978-90-04-41943-8.
- Merid Wolde Aregay (1971). Southern Ethiopia and the Christian Kingdom, 1508–1708, with Special Reference to the Galla Migrations and Their Consequences (PhD). School of Oriental and African Studies, University of London.
- Pankhurst, Richard (1997). The Ethiopian Borderlands: Essays in Regional History from Ancient Times to the End of the 18th Century. Lawrenceville, NJ: Red Sea Press. ISBN 978-0-932415-19-6.
