= Genale Dawa III Hydroelectric Power Station =

Power station in Ethiopia

Genale Dawa III Dam
- Location of Genale Dawa III Power Station; Placement on map is approximate Genale Dawa III Dam (Africa) Genale Dawa III Dam (Earth)
- Country: Ethiopia
- Coordinates: 05°30′36.5″N 39°43′05″E
- Purpose: Part of Ethiopia's plan of universal electrification access by 2025
- Construction began: March 2011
- Opening date: 2020
- Construction cost: £352.7 million ($451 million)
- Owner: Ethiopian Electric Power

Dam and spillways
- Type of dam: Gravity dam
- Impounds: Ganale Doria River
- Length: 110
- Width (crest): 456
- Dam volume: 3.22 million
- Spillway type: CFRD
- Spillway capacity: 1,880 m3/second

Power Station
- Commission date: February 2020
- Turbines: 3 x 84.7 MW
- Installed capacity: 254 MW (341,000 hp)

The Genale Dawa III Power Station, also GD-3 Power Station, is a hydroelectric power station across the Ganale Doria River in Ethiopia. Construction began circa March 2011 and the power station was commercially commissioned in February 2020. The renewable energy infrastructure development is owned by the government of Ethiopia and was constructed by China Gezhouba Group, a subsidiary of China Energy Engineering Corporation at an estimated cost of £352.7 million ($451 million), co-financed by the Exim Bank of China and the Ethiopian Government.

== Location ==
The power station lies across the Ganale Doria River, along the border of Kobadi Woreda and Meda Welabu Woreda, in the Bale Zone of the Oromia Region of Ethiopia. This is approximately 610 kilometres (379 mi) by road, southeast of Addis Ababa, the largest city and capital of Ethiopia. The geographical coordinates of Genale–Dawa 3 Hydroelectric Power Station are 05°30'36.5"N, 39°43'05.0"E (Latitude:5.510139; Longitude:39.718056).

== Overview ==
The dam is a "concrete-lined rockfill dam". The water reservoir measures 110 metres (361 ft) in height and is 456 metres (1,496 ft) long. The dam reservoir has a retention capacity of 3,200,000 cubic metres (113,006,934 cu ft) of water. The underground powerhouse has three Francis turbines, each rated at 84.7 megawatts, relaying the power to an above-ground switchyard. From the power station, two high-voltage transmission lines (one at 400kV and another at 230kV), transfer the energy a total of 295 kilometres (183 mi) to a substation owned by the Ethiopian Electric Power, where the energy is integrated into the national grid.

== Ownership ==
Genale–Dawa III Hydroelectric Power Station is wholly owned and operated by the Government of Ethiopia.

== Construction costs and funding ==
The construction budget is quoted as £352.7 million (US$451 million). The table below outlines the sources of funding for constructing the dam and power station, including the associated infrastructure.

Funding Sources For Genale Dawa III Hydroelectric Power Station
Rank	Funder	Contribution in British Pounds	Percentage	Notes
1	Exim Bank of China	254.85 million	72.26	Loan
2	Government of Ethiopia	53.00 million	15.03	Equity Investment
3	Others	44.83 million	12.71	Loan
	Total	352.7 million	100.00	

- Note: Totals are slightly off due to rounding.

== Other considerations ==
GD-3 Dam is a multi-purpose dam. Besides power generation, the dam reservoir serves as a water storage facility for use during water scarcity. In addition, the water will be used for irrigation of approximately 15,000 hectares (58 mi^{2}), as part of the Lower Genale Irrigation Development Project.

== See also ==
- List of power stations in Ethiopia
- Grand Ethiopian Renaissance Dam
