= Delo Menna =

Administrative division of Ethiopia

Coordinates: 6°25′N 39°50′E

Delo Mena is one of the woredas in the Oromia Region of Ethiopia. It was part of former Mena Harana woreda what was separated into Delo Mena and Harena Buluk woredas, and it is part of the Bale Zone. Delo Mena is bordered on the south by Meda Welabu, on the west and northwest by Harena Buluk, on the north by Goba, on the northeast by Berbere, and on the east by Guradamole. The administrative center of this woreda is Mena

== Overview ==
Most of this woreda is less than 1500 meters above sea level; Mount Orbo is the highest point. Rivers include the Welmel, Demal, Yadot, Elgo, Erba, Shawe and the Dayyu Rivers. A survey of the land in this woreda shows that 9.8% is arable or cultivable, 29.3% pasture, 56.5% forest or other heavy vegetation, and the remaining 4.1% is considered swampy, degraded or otherwise unusable. Cereals, chickpeas and haricot beans are important crops. Coffee is an important cash crop; over 5,000 hectares are planted with it.

Industry in the woreda includes 10 grain mills, one coffee pulper, and one government-owned saw mill. There were 32 Farmers Associations with 9,146 members and 3 Farmers Service Cooperatives with 913 members. The statistics for road coverage and access to drinking water are not available for Mennana Harena Buluk.

== Demographics ==
The 2007 national census reported a total population for this woreda of 89,670, of whom 45,570 were men and 44,100 were women; 10,660 or 11.89% of its population were urban dwellers. The majority of the inhabitants said they were Muslim, with 92.59% of the population reporting they observed this belief, while 6.63% of the population practised Ethiopian Orthodox Christianity.

Based on figures published by the Central Statistical Agency in 2005, this woreda has an estimated total population of 114,627, of whom 56,493 are men and 58,134 are women; 14,289 or 12.47% of its population are urban dwellers, which is less than the Zone average of 13.5%. With an estimated area of 6,680.94 square kilometers, Mennana Harena Buluk has an estimated population density of 17.2 people per square kilometer, which is less than the Zone average of 27.

The 1994 national census reported a total population for this woreda of 97,586, of whom 47,820 were men and 49,766 women; 9,997 or 10.24% of its population were urban dwellers at the time. The two largest ethnic groups reported in Mennana Harena Buluk were the Oromo (93%), and the Amhara (5.49%); all other ethnic groups made up 1.51% of the population. Oromiffa was spoken as a first language by 91.88%, and 7.49% spoke Amharic; the remaining 0.63% spoke all other primary languages reported. The majority of the inhabitants were Muslim, with 79.97% of the population having reported they practiced that belief, while 19.26% of the population said they professed Ethiopian Orthodox Christianity.
