= List of World Heritage Sites in Ethiopia =

Locations of World Heritage Sites in Ethiopia. Red dots represent cultural sites; green dots are natural sites

The United Nations Educational, Scientific and Cultural Organization (UNESCO) World Heritage Sites are places of importance to cultural or natural heritage as described in the UNESCO World Heritage Convention, established in 1972. Cultural heritage consists of monuments (such as architectural works, monumental sculptures, or inscriptions), groups of buildings, and sites (including archaeological sites). Natural heritage consists of natural features (physical and biological formations), geological and physiographical formations (including habitats of threatened species of animals and plants), and natural sites which are important from the point of view of science, conservation, or natural beauty. Ethiopia accepted the convention on 6 July 1977. There are 12 World Heritage Sites in Ethiopia, with a further six on the tentative list.

The first two sites in Ethiopia added to the list were the Rock-Hewn Churches, Lalibela, and the Simien National Park, both at the Second Session of the World Heritage Committee, held in Washington, D.C., in 1978. The most recent site listed was the Melka Kunture and Balchit, in 2024. Simien and Bale Mountains are natural sites while the other ten sites are listed for their cultural significance. In 1996 Simien was listed as endangered because of the impact of a new road across the property, excessive cattle grazing, agricultural encroachment, and a drop in the number of populations of large mammals. Following improvements in management and recovering animal communities, the site was removed from the endangered list in 2017. Ethiopia has served as a member of the World Heritage Committee twice: 2009–2013 and 2019–2023.

== World Heritage Sites ==
UNESCO lists sites under ten criteria; each entry must meet at least one of the criteria. Criteria i through vi are cultural, and vii through x are natural.

World Heritage Sites
Site	Image	Location (region)	Year listed	UNESCO data	Description
Simien National Park	A mountain landscape with deep precipices	Amhara	1978	9; vii, x (natural)	Through millions of years, erosion has shaped the Ethiopian plateau into a landscape of jagged mountain peaks, deep valleys, and sharp precipices. The area is a biodiversity hotspot and home to threatened species including the Walia Ibex, gelada, and Ethiopian wolf. Between 1996 and 2017, the site was listed as endangered because of the impact of a new road across the property, excessive cattle grazing, agricultural encroachment, and a drop in the number of populations of large mammals.
Rock-Hewn Churches, Lalibela	A picture of a pink-coloured building intact inside of a large, square hole	Amhara	1978	18; i, iii (cultural)	Eleven churches were hewn from monolithic blocks in the 13th century, under the king Gebre Meskel Lalibela, to substitute for places in the Holy Land at a time when the pilgrimages there were not possible. They had an important influence on the Ethiopian Church and are still in use, even if they have been damaged through centuries. Several churches have interior walls decorated by murals. A village with traditional houses is situated nearby. The Church of Saint George is pictured.
Fasil Ghebbi, Gondar Region	A picture of a four-storey stone castle surrounded by a grassy lawn and four cylindrical towers	Amhara	1979	19; ii, iii (cultural)	The Ethiopian Empire had no fixed capital until Emperor Fasilides settled in Gondar in 1636. The palace complex served as the residence of the monarchs until 1864. It comprises the royal castle (pictured), several palaces, churches, monasteries, and other buildings. The architectural style was influenced by Hindu and Arab architecture and later remodelled in the European Baroque style brought by Jesuit missionaries.
Aksum	A large carved obelisk standing upright	Tigray	1980	15; i, iv (cultural)	Axum was the capital of the important eponymous kingdom that was located at the crossroads between Africa, Asia, and the Greco-Roman world in the first millennium. The kingdom controlled the trade routes of the Red Sea and with North Africa. It converted to Christianity in the 4th century. The ruins of the city feature delicately carved stelae dating from the 3rd and 4th centuries (the Obelisk of Axum pictured), royal tombs, churches, and stone tablets with multilingual inscriptions.
Lower Valley of the Awash	Reconstruction of the fossil skeleton of "Lucy" the Australopithecus afarensis	Afar	1980	10; ii, iii, iv (cultural)	The area of the lower Awash River is one of the most important archaeological sites in the study of human evolution. It was occupied by early hominids for millions of years and well preserved fossils have been discovered here. Among the most important finds are the remains of the Australopithecus afarensis Lucy, discovered in 1974 and dating back 3.2 million years (skeleton cast pictured) and the Ardipithecus ramidus Ardi, which is 4.4 million years old.
Tiya	An upright stele with carvings resembling swords. Two stelae in the background.	Central Ethiopia Regional State	1980	12; i, iv (cultural)	Tiya is the most representative of several prehistoric megalithic sites in the Soddo region. In Tiya, there are 36 stelae, 33 of which are aligned along an axis of 45 m (148 ft). Most of the stelae are carved with symbols, some of which resemble swords. As tombs have been discovered nearby, the stelae are interpreted to have funerary significance. The age of the site has not yet been precisely determined.
Lower Valley of the Omo	A view of a lightly muddy river	South Ethiopia Regional State	1980	17; iii, iv (cultural)	The area close to Lake Turkana, with sediment layers spanning between 3.5 and one million years ago (Pliocene and Pleistocene), is an important archaeological site in the study of human evolution. Numerous remains of early hominids were find on site, including fossils belonging to the genera Australopithecus and Homo. Some of the oldest stone tools have been found as well, providing insight into the development of first technical activities.
Harar Jugol, the Fortified Historic Town	Children under the arched gate in the stone city walls	Harari	2006	1189rev; i, ii, iv, v (cultural)	The city of Harar is a sacred Muslim city with numerous mosques and shrines, some dating to the 10th century. The city walls (pictured) were built between the 13th and 16th centuries while the present-day urban layout dates to the 16th century. The architecture of the houses is different from that of Muslim countries but shows the influence of the coastal Arab style. The interiors are richly decorated. The arrival of Indian merchants in the late 19th century brought a new style, houses with wooden verandas.
Konso Cultural Landscape	A child and an adult in a village with stone walls and a house with a thatched roof	South Ethiopia Regional State	2011	1333rev; iii, v (cultural)	The Konso people have lived in the area for more than 400 years. To combat the harsh and dry environment in the highlands, they have created terraces for agriculture, as well as stonewalls and fortified villages for protection, resulting in a unique cultural landscape. The people maintain their traditions, including carving wooden anthropomorphic sculptures as grave markers, and are one of the last societies in the world that continue the practice of erecting stelae. A scene from a village is pictured.
Bale Mountains National Park	Large lobelia plants in a highland habitat with low vegetation	Oromia	2023	111rev; vii, x (natural)	The Bale Mountains comprise different habitat types, including tropical forests, cloud forest, wetlands, and the largest extent of alpine habitat above 3,000 m (9,800 ft) in Africa. Volcanic activity and glaciation in the past have created a rugged landscape with ridges, escarpments, valleys, and glacial lakes. The area is home to endemic and rare species, including the Ethiopian wolf, Bale monkey, mountain nyala, and eight endemic rodents. Among plants, giant lobelias (pictured) grow in the highlands.
Gedeo Cultural Landscape	Several columnar stelae in tropical vegetation	South Ethiopia Regional State	2023	1641; iii, v (cultural)	The cultural landscape was shaped by the Gedeo people who continue to live in line with their traditions and beliefs. They grow coffee, enset, and other food crops, and practice sustainable agroforestry. Traditional system of land use regulations has allowed for a high population density while maintaining the biodiversity of the area. There are numerous megalithic ritual monuments, either stelae or in phallic form (pictured).
Melka Kunture and Balchit: Archaeological and Palaeontological Sites in the Highland Area of Ethiopia	Three stone chopper tools on black background, museum photo	Oromiya	2024	13rev; iii, iv, v (cultural)	Melka Kunture is a large archaeological site in the highlands of the upper Awash River. The deposits, at places up to 100 m (330 ft) thick, span more than 1.7 million years. Archaeologists have discovered thousands of stone tools, as well as remains of Homo erectus and archaic Homo sapiens, and remains of prehistoric flora and fauna. Stone tools begin with the earliest Oldowan tools (three choppers pictured), continue with the more sophisticated Acheulean tools, and end with Late Stone Age tools. An important material for the stone tools was obsidian that was sourced at the nearby site of Balchit.

== Tentative list ==
In addition to sites inscribed on the World Heritage List, member states can maintain a list of tentative sites that they may consider for nomination. Nominations for the World Heritage List are only accepted if the site was previously listed on the tentative list. Ethiopia maintains six properties on its tentative list.

Tentative sites
Site	Image	Location (region)	Year listed	UNESCO criteria	Description
Dirre Sheik Hussein Religious, Cultural and Historical Site	A small white shrine in Islamic style	Oromia	2011	ii, iii, iv, vi (cultural)	The town of Sheik Hussein is an important Islamic pilgrimage site for the Muslim communities of the Horn of Africa and the Middle East. It is named after Sheikh Hussein (tomb pictured), a 13th century Somali saint from Merca who brought Islam to the area. There are numerous mosques, shrines, residential, and ceremonial buildings in the town.
Holqa Sof Omar: Natural and Cultural Heritage (Sof Omar: Caves of Mystery)	A tunnel in a karst cave	Oromia	2023	iii, v, vi, vii, viii (mixed)	The extensive limestone karst cave system was created by the Weyib River in the Miocene, from 23 to 5 million years ago. The caves exhibit numerous geomorphological formations, including large underground chambers with limestone pillars. The caves are connected to the cult of the Muslim saint Sheik Sof Omar Ahmed, who probably lived here in the 11th century. They are also important for the followers of traditional religions, focusing on spirit worship and ghost cults.
Sacred Landscapes of Tigray	Interior of a rock-hewn church with painted walls and ceiling	Tigray	2018	ii, iii, iv, v, vi (cultural)	This nomination comprises three clusters with a total of 121 rock-hewn churches in Gere-alta, Tembien, and Atsbi. Some churches are also made from stone and timber. They date from the 5th to 14th centuries, with wooden one being some of the oldest preserved timber structures still in use in the world. They are located at high elevations up to 2,900 m (9,500 ft) above the sea level. The earliest churches are associated with the Nine Syrian Saints who founded a series of monasteries. The interiors of the churches are decorated with wall paintings, with those after the 15th century being influenced by the Italian Renaissance. The church Abuna Yemata Guh is pictured.
The Cultural Heritage of Yeha	Ruins of a tall stone building	Tigray	2020	i, ii, iii, iv (cultural)	Yeha was a centre of a pre-Axumite society in the first millennium BCE. The monuments on the site include the Great Temple (pictured) from the 7th century BCE, which is the oldest standing structure in Sub-Saharan Africa, the remains of Palace of Grat Beal Gebri, and two cemeteries with rock-cut tombs. The remains of material culture and stone and bronze inscriptions demonstrate the trade links with South Arabia. Yeha also influenced the buildings of Axum.
Lake Tana Island Monasteries and its Adjacent Wetland Natural and Cultural Heritages	A church with a circular shape with a thatched roof	Amhara	2021	iii, v, vi, x (mixed)	Lake Tana is Ethiopia's largest freshwater lake and the source of the Blue Nile. The area is rich in biodiversity and home to several endemic animal and plant species. The nearby Blue Nile Falls are known for their scenic beauty. The monasteries on the islands of the lake are important centres of Ethiopian Orthodox Church and were spiritual and political centres of the medieval Ethiopian Empire. Church of Narga Selassie on Dek Island is pictured.
Simien Mountains National Park (SMNP)	A mountain escarpment with sparse vegetation	Amhara	2023	vii, x (natural)	This is a proposed extension to the existing World Heritage Site, following the significant expansion of the national park in 2014, when the protected area was increased by two thirds.
