= Battle of Saraye =

1531 battle of Ethiopia–Adal War

- Part of the Ethiopian–Adal War
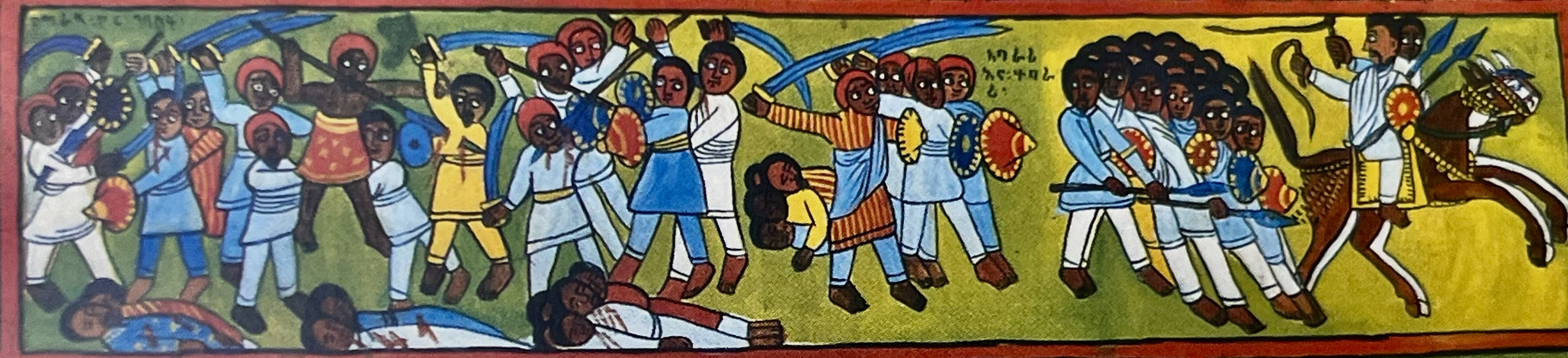
- An Ethiopian painting depicting the Adalites pursuing the fleeing Abyssinian army
Date	July 1535
Location	Saraye, Ethiopian Empire
Result	Adalite victory
Territorial changes	Medri Bahri annexed by Adal

Belligerents
Adal Sultanate	Ethiopian Empire

Commanders and leaders
(Adal Sultanate) Wazir Abbas (Adal Sultanate) Abu Bakr Qecchin	Tasfa Le’ul †

Strength
600	Unknown

Casualties and losses
Minimal	Heavy; entire force annihilated

The Battle of Saraye was fought in 1535 between Adal Sultanate forces under Wazir Abbas and the Abyssinian army under Tafsā Le’ul. The battle ended with a victory for the Muslim Adalites against the Christian Ethiopians.

== Prelude ==
After conquered Tigre and Aksum, Imam Ahmed Gurey sent his top general Wazir ‘Addoli to support his nephew Wazir Abbas who was conquering the northern regions of Medri Bahri specifically Seraye. However Addoli and Abbas were ambushed by an Azmach of Saraye named Tafsā Le’ul though outnumbered Addoli valiantly used himself to help his men escape facing the massive army alone before eventually succumbing to his wounds. Tafsā Le’ul then beheaded Addoli's corpse and sent it Dawit II who prepared a feast a celebrated what he supposed was a turning of the tide of the war. Imam Ahmed upon hearing the news marched at the head of an army to meet up with Abbas however Tafsā Le’ul heard this news and encountered Abbas before he could meet up with The Imam.

== Battle ==
The Adalite forces meager as they were however fought valiantly and push back the Abyssinian wave. Tafsā Le’ul himself was slain by a Somali infantrymen who struck him on the shoulder. Upon seeing his death the Abyssinian army scattered in a disorganized retreat leading them to an open field where they were all killed to the last man including all of Tafsā Le’ul's sons. The Tarike Negast dates this battle to the month Hamle which corresponds to July.

== Aftermath ==
The Imam then placed Abbas as the Grand Vizier in place of Addoli and gave his previous title of Bahr Negash to an Emir named ‘Afra. The people of Medri Bahri, who had been receptive to the Adalite army before the battle, all either converted or paid the Jizya voluntarily.
