= Legehida =

Administrative division of Ethiopia

Coordinates: 7°45′N 41°15′E

Legehidha (also called Beltu Kurkurru) is one of the woredas in the Oromia of Ethiopia. Part of the Bale Zone, Legehidha is bordered on the south by Seweyna, on the southwest by Gololcha, and all other sides by the Shebelle River which separates this woreda from the West Hararghe Zone on the northwest, the East Hararghe Zone on the northeast and from the Somali Region on the east. The administrative center of the woreda is Beltu; other towns in Legehidha nearly Sheikh Hussein.

Overview Laga Hidha District (Beltu Kurkurru) is one of the desert districts in Eastern Bale Zone and is located 676 km from the capital city of Finfinnee. It is located 108km from Gindhir, the capital of East Bale zone; The land area is approximately 615,715 km² and the district is located at an altitude of 1280~1800 km above sea level. Flatland 63.6%, Outlying 29.6,% Hilly 4.1%, Mountainous 0.3% and Caffeine _2.4 Climate:- Moderate temperature

== Overview ==
Mount Goden is the highest point in this woreda; other major peaks include Mounts Gerecha and Keban. Perennial rivers include the Tare and Harkiso-Fik. A survey of the land in this woreda shows that 16.5% is arable or cultivable (4.24% was in annual crops), 50% pasture, 28.3% forest, and the remaining 5.2% is considered swampy, mountainous or otherwise unusable. Wheat, teff and corn are important crops. Although coffee is an important cash crop, less than 2,000 hectares are planted with it.

No licensed industry exists in this woreda, although there five retailers and one service provider. There were 17 Farmers Associations with 6149 members and no Farmers Service Cooperatives. Legehida has no roads, leaving Beltu 65 kilometers from the nearest all-weather road; the Socio-Economic profile for the Bale Zone describes Legehida as "one of the remotest districts in the Zone". About 4.7% of the total population has access to drinking water.

== Demographics ==
The 2007 national census reported a total population for this woreda of 62,521, of whom 31,286 were men and 31,235 were women; 2,016 or 3.23% of its population were urban dwellers. The majority of the inhabitants said they were Muslim, with 99.22% of the population reporting they observed this belief.

Based on figures published by the Central Statistical Agency in 2005, this woreda has an estimated total population of 52,568, of whom 26,414 were males and 26,154 were females; 1,225 or 2.33% of its population are urban dwellers, which is less than the Zone average of 13.5%. With an estimated area of 5,799.69 square kilometers, Legehida has an estimated population density of 9.1 people per square kilometer, which is less than the Zone average of 27.

The 1994 national census reported a total population for this woreda of 38,052, of whom 19,031 were men and 19,021 women; 683 or 1.79% of its population were urban dwellers at the time. The largest ethnic group reported in Legehida was the Oromo (99.5%); Oromiffa was spoken as a first language by 96.95%, while the remaining 3.05% spoke all other primary languages reported. The majority of the inhabitants were Muslim, with 99.89% of the population having reported they practiced that belief.
