= Sheikh Hussein =

- Town
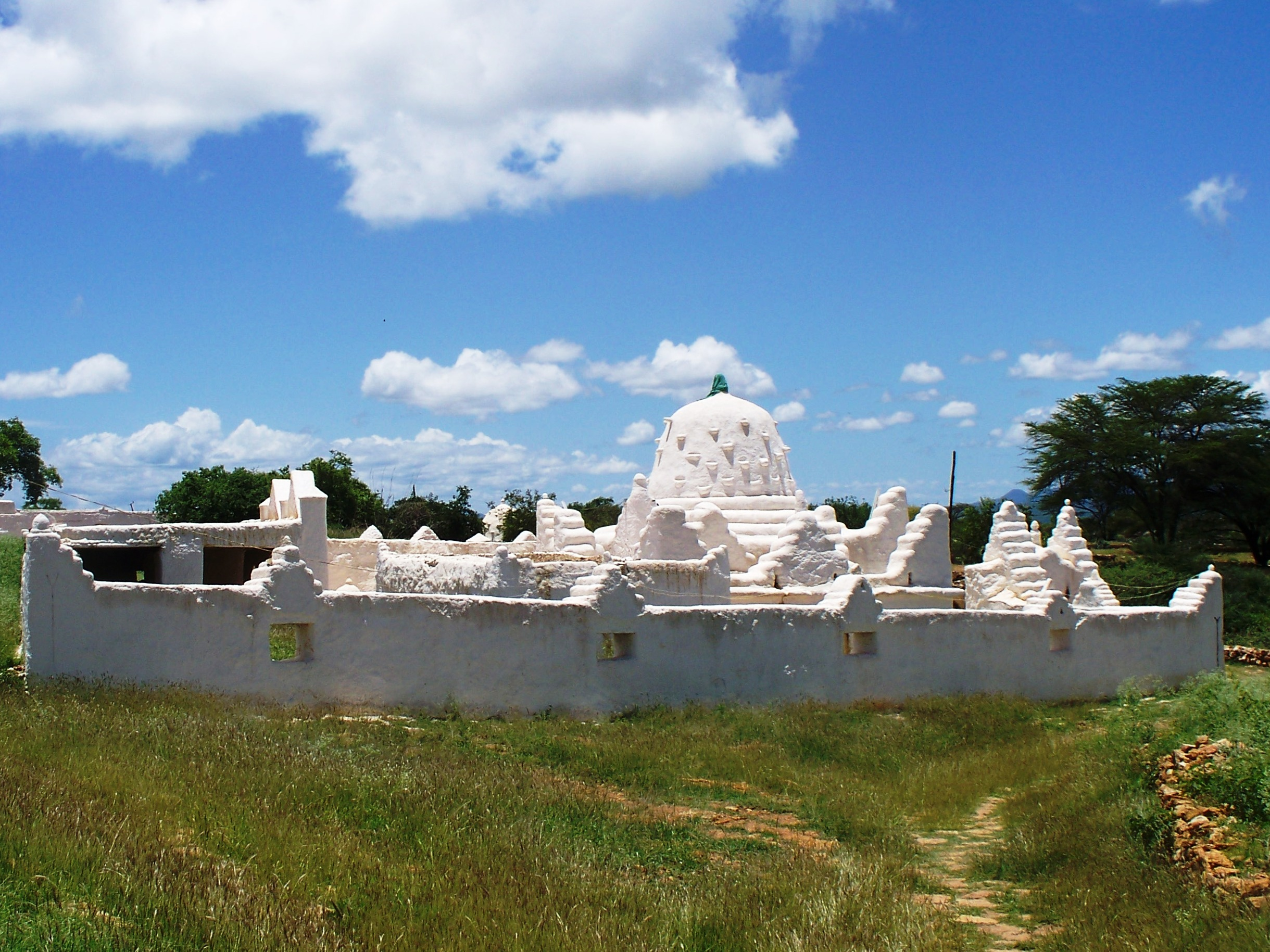
- The shrine of Sheikh Hussein

- Location within Ethiopia
- Coordinates: 7°45′N 40°42′E
- Country: Ethiopia
- Region: Oromia
- Zone: Bale
- Elevation: 1,386 m (4,547 ft)
- Time zone: UTC+3 (EAT)

Sheikh Hussein is a town in south-eastern Ethiopia. Located in the Bale Zone of the Oromia Region, it has a longitude and latitude of 7°45′N 40°42′E with an elevation of 1386 meters above sea level. The Central Statistical Agency has not published an estimate for this town's 2005 population.

The site has been recorded in the tentative list for UNESCO World Heritage List since 2011 as a religious, cultural and historical site.

== Overview ==
On 23 December 2007, Addis Fortune reported that SATCON Construction, an Ethiopian-owned firm, completed a four-year effort to build a 170 kilometer road through the mountainous area of the Oromia connecting Sheikh Hussein with the town of Micheta, located in the Daru labu woreda of the West Hararghe Zone. The road was formally inaugurated 19 December.

Arthur Donaldson Smith arrived at Sheikh Hussein 21 September 1894, where he spent several days, and afterwards his companion visited the tomb of Sheikh Hussein's assistant Sheikh Mohammed.

== Tomb of the saint ==
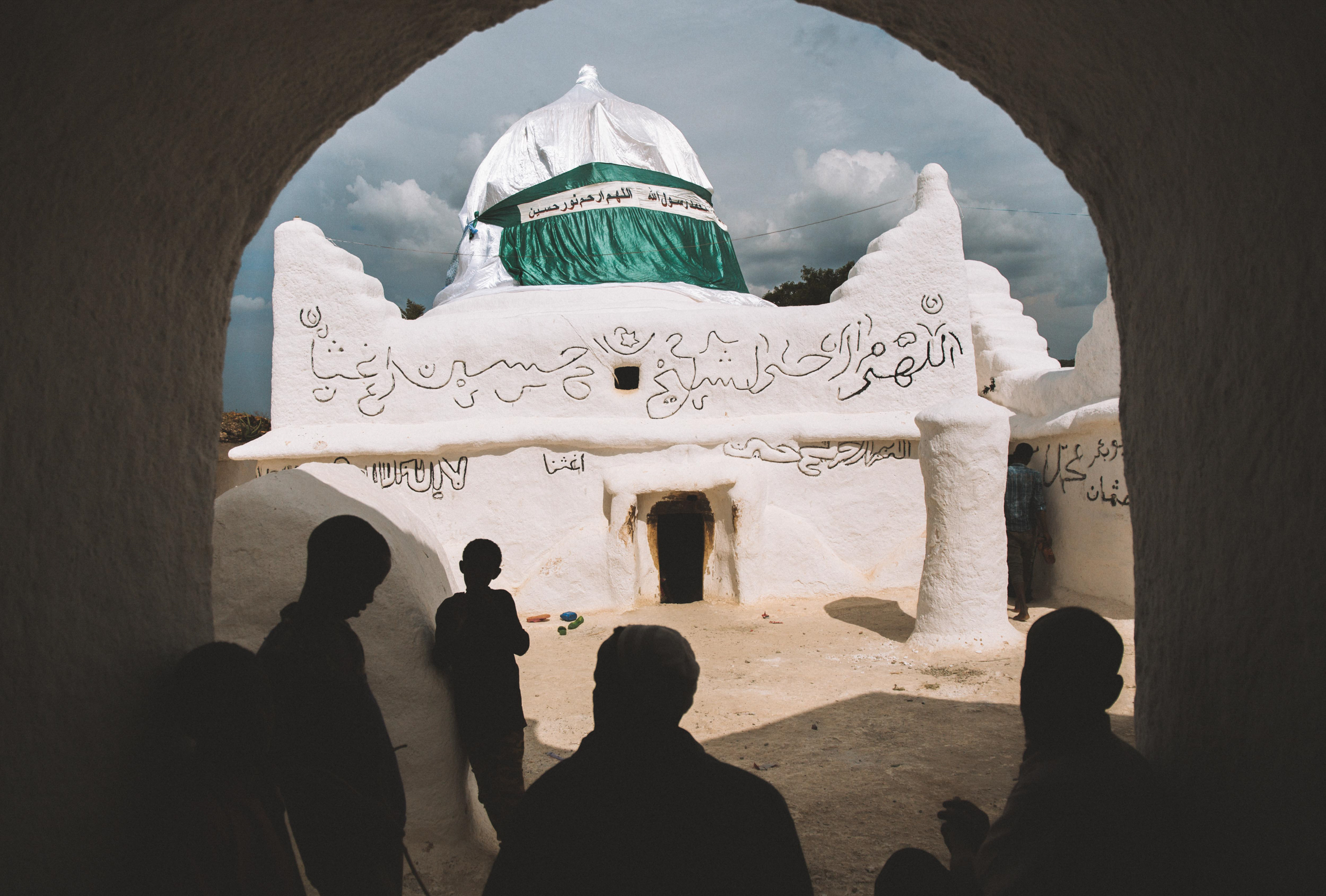
Dirre Sheikh Hussein

The town is named after what, in some Ethiopian Muslim eyes, is the most sacred place in that country: the tomb of the thirteenth century Somali saint called Sheikh Hussein from a small village called Gela near Chinaksen, who introduced Islam to the Sidamo people living in the area at the time. He is also credited for founding and establishing the Sultanate of Bale and is said to have performed many miracles. A number of these miracles have been recorded in a hagiography published in Cairo in the 1920s, entitled Rabi` al-Qulub. Although this town is now within the homelands of the Oromo people, it has continued to be the destination of approximately 50,000 pilgrims from Muslim Ethiopia twice a year during the Muslim months of Hajj and Rabi' al-Awwal. The first pilgrimage is to commemorate his birth, the second his death. They traditionally carry cleft sticks known as "Oulle Sheikh Hussein", which are too small to serve as walking sticks and are not utilized for any practical purpose. Once they arrive at the shrine, the pilgrims take their turns entering the saint's tomb by crawling through a small doorway.

The extensive religious complex dedicated to the saint includes the town and the nearby valley of Kachamsare. In the 18th century, Emir `Abd al-Shakur ibn Yusuf of Harar constructed a shrine to the Baghdadi saint `Abd al-Qadir al-Jilani near the tomb of Sheikh Hussein, inside the shrine compound. A graveyard has also been consecrated as part of the complex. Other landmarks of the complex include the pond of Dinkiro, 300 meters south of the mosque, built in dry stone masonry; associated with the pond is a spring with "miraculous" water. At the entrance of the holy area are two wild fig trees called kiltu (identified as Ficus sycomorus) in the Oromo language. Near another pond, of Imaro, there is the mosque of Sheikh Hussein's father, both with a gubba of Harar type. Also nearby are several caves—a "cave of serpents", a "cave of herbs", and a "cave of honey"—and rock formations said to be petrified persons.
