= Delo Serbo =

Dello Sebro (Oromo: afaan) (Amharic: ደሎ ሠብሮ) is the second largest town in the woreda of Ginir. The town is in the Bale Zone in the Oromia Region of Ethiopia and is located at approximately 7011ꞌ latitude North and 40038ꞌ longitude East. Its location is along the highway (at 512 km spot from Addis Ababa) to Ginnir where the road to the Dirre Sheik Husein Shrine is converged northward.

‘Dello’ is named after a coffee merchants’ temporary market site who came from ‘Dello Buna’ and ‘Sebro’ is the former Oromo tribe settled in the area. The two words combined to form Dello Sebro, meaning Dello of the Sebro tribe.

Dello Sebro is bordered to the north by Abursha Dineshie, the east by Amolicho Lalu, the southeast by Tife Doda, the southwest by Ajjamsa, and the west by Jafera Hulluqqo villages. The Werrangabbo River, which is called the Gololcha in its lower course, passes to the Northeast and serves as a boundary between Dello Sebroo, Jafera Hulluqqo and Abursha Dineshie. Werrangabbo was the main source of drinking water for local people before 1997, but today it is used for cattle during the dry seasons.

Dello Sebro is divided into town administration and Peasants’ Village, so both town dwellers, mostly merchants and service givers, and farmers are living in the town. According to the information from the town's administration in 2014 the number of registered permanent residents is 10,180, consisting of 4,968 males and 5,212 females. Most of the residents (above 85%) are Orthodox Christians and the rest are Muslims. The number of Muslim residents is now increasing rapidly. In Dello Sebro there are two churches namely Washa St. Gebriel (established in the 1890s) and St. Medihanealem (established in 1977). There is also one mosque in the area (established before 1974). More than 90% of the residents are Oromo and the rest are Amhara.

In Dello Sebro there are two schools. The primary school was opened in 1960, and then developed into a junior school (including the 7th and 8th grades) in 1981, and later developed further to a high school in 2004. The primary school was separated from the former in 2006 and built in its present site. This year in September 2014, the present secondary school first cycle (grades 9th and 10th) is stepped to next second cycle (grade 11th and 12th).

There are two wet seasons; the spring wet season in March, April, and May and the Autumn wet season in September, October and November. January is the only month without rainfall. Due to dual rainy season crops are produced twice a year. Located on a volcanic high land area, the villages surrounding Dello Sebro are known grain producers. Barley, Wheat, Maize, teff, Beans, Peas, Lentils, and Niger seed are the major crops produced. Dello Sebro is known in the region for its wheat production. In the autumn markets are full of the sweet sorghum called Tinkish, which has a sweet stem. Moreover, the cattle market of Dello Sebro is the most known in its quality and size in the Bale zone. The largest market is on Monday and Friday is the mini market day.

The town now has a gravity powered drinking water pump, a 24-hour hydro electric power plant and a mobile phone network. The National Bank of Ethiopia opened a branch in the town in 2013.
