= Seweyna =

District of Ethiopia

Coordinates: 7°20′N 41°20′E

Seweyna is one of the woredas in the Oromia Region of Ethiopia. Located in the eastern part of the Bale Zone, Seweyna is bordered on the south by Raytu, on the southwest by Ginir, on the northwest by Gaserana Gololcha, on the north by Legehida, and on the east by the Somali Region. Towns in Seweyna include Hada.

== Overview ==
The geography of this woreda is characterized by a dry plain in the western part and lowland in the east marked by low escarpments, flood plains and lava flows. Elevations extend from 400 to 1850 meters above sea level. Major rivers include the Mekenisa, Dare, Manduba and Kurkura. A survey of the land in this woreda shows that 24.4% is arable or cultivable, 46.3% pasture, 24.1% forest or heavy vegetation, and the remaining 5.2% is considered degraded, mountainous or otherwise unusable. Corn, sorghum, wheat and teff are important local crops. Raising livestock is another important source of food and income, which include in order of importance shoats, camels and cattle; during the months of May and June, inhabitants of the western kebeles who rely more on raising crops, collect and consume a wild fruit called kulkal (known locally as Shonka). Seweyna is considered a chronically food insecure woreda, and food aid is received irrespective of their income levels.

Industry in the woreda includes 2 grain mills created with funding from the Regional government, as well as one wholesaler and 18 retailers. There were 19 Farmers Associations with 7750 members and no Farmers Service Cooperatives. Seweyna has no kilometers of road. About 10% of the total population has access to drinking water.

== Demographics ==
The 2007 national census reported a total population for this woreda of 65,846, of whom 32,996 were men and 32,850 were women; 3,775 or 5.73% of its population were urban dwellers. The majority of the inhabitants said they were Muslim, with 97.63% of the population reporting they observed this belief, while 2.15% of the population practised Ethiopian Orthodox Christianity.

Based on figures published by the Central Statistical Agency in 2005, this woreda has an estimated total population of 49,381, of whom 24,750 were males and 24,631 were females; 301 or 0.61% of its population are urban dwellers, which is less than the Zone average of 13.5%. With an estimated area of 8,108.44 square kilometers, Seweyna has an estimated population density of 6.1 people per square kilometer, which is less than the Zone average of 27.

The 1994 national census reported a total population for this woreda of 35,769, of whom 17,934 were men and 17,835 women; 562 or 1.57% of its population were urban dwellers at the time. The two largest ethnic groups reported in Seweyna were the Oromo (89.44%), and the Somali (7.56%); all other ethnic groups made up 3% of the population. Oromiffa was spoken as a first language by 91.58%, and 8.4% spoke Somali; the remaining 0.02% spoke all other primary languages reported. The majority of the inhabitants were Muslim, with 99.91% of the population having reported they practiced that belief.
