= Dawe Kachen =

Ethiopian administrative division

Dawe Kachen is one of the woredas (an administrative division) in the Oromia Region of Ethiopia. It was part of Goro woreda. It is part of the Bale Zone.

== Demographics ==
The 2007 national census reported a total population for this woreda of 30,849, of whom 16,181 were men and 14,668 were women; 693 or 2.25% of its population were urban dwellers. The majority of the inhabitants said they were Muslim, with 99.47% of the population reporting they observed this belief.

== See also ==
- Politics of Ethiopia
