= Wasan Sagad =

General in the Ethiopian Empire

Ras Wasan Sagad
- Born: 15th Century
- Died: May 31, 1531
- Allegiance: Ethiopian Empire
- Rank: Bitwoded
- Conflicts: Ethiopian–Adal War

Wasan Sagad (Ge’ez: ወሰን ሰገድ) was a general and nobleman in the Ethiopian Empire under Lebna Dengel. He served as a key advisor and general during the early years of Lebna Dengel’s reign and during the Ethiopian-Adal War

== Biography ==
Known as "the Father of The Poor", he was well respected among the Ethiopian Nobility and his status akin to that of Lebna Dengel himself according to Shihab ad-Din Ahmad bin 'Abd al-Qader, Ahmed Gurey’s personal scribe. He served as an advisor early on the reign of Lebna Dengel. According to Portuguese missionary and explorer Francisco Álvares he served as Bitwoded of the left during the year 1520. According to Shihab Ad Din, He held enough sway in court to save his brother, Wanag Jan, from execution after the latter's conversion to Islam. He was killed during an ambush at Mount Busat by the army of Ahmed Gurey. He was killed by a Muslim Commander by the name of ‘Ābad ibn Rājih

== Legacy ==
Wasan Sagad's sons are mentioned in the chronicles for continuing to resist the invading Adal army. Although Baher Sagad was killed, another son Saf Saggad was able to flee with his relatives and foot soldiers before the invading troops led by Abu Bakr Qecchin, a general of Adal could capture the Abyssinian province of Dawaro.
