= Goba (woreda) =

District in Oromia Region, Ethiopia

Coordinates: 6°50′N 39°50′E

Goba is a woreda in the Oromia Region, Ethiopia. It is named after the town of Goba. Part of the Bale Zone, Goba is bordered on the south by Mennana Harena Buluk, on the west by Mirab Arsi Zone, on the north by the Mena River which separates it from Sinanana Dinsho, and on the southeast by Berbere.

== Overview ==
About 45% of this woreda is rugged or mountainous; Mount Tullu Demtu is the highest point in this woreda, the Zone and the Oromia Region; other important peaks include Mount Batu. Rivers include the Togona and Shaya. A survey of the land in this woreda shows that 13% is arable or cultivable, 27.6% pasture, 54.6% forest (or part of the Bale Mountains National Park), and the remaining 4.8% is considered degraded or otherwise unusable. Cereals, horse beans, field peas and lentils are important crops.

Industry in the woreda includes 40 grain mills, 18 edible oil mills and 13 other small-scale factories employing 214 people, as well as 80 wholesalers, 464 retailers and 198 service providers. There were 9 Farmers Associations with 4534 members and 5 Farmers Service Cooperatives with 2350 members. Goba has 92 kilometers of all-weather road, for an average road density of 56.8 kilometers per 1000 square kilometers. About 41.7% of the total population has access to drinking water.

== Demographics ==
The 2007 national census reported a total population for this woreda of 40,757, of whom 20,615 were men and 20,142 were women; none of its population were urban dwellers. The majority of the inhabitants said they were Muslim, with 76.89% of the population reporting they observed this belief, while 22.89% of the population practised Ethiopian Orthodox Christianity.

Based on figures published by the Central Statistical Agency in 2005, this woreda has an estimated total population of 92,791, of whom 47,774 were males and 45,017 were females; 50,650 or 54.59% of its population are urban dwellers, which is greater than the Zone average of 13.5%. With an estimated area of 1,619.38 square kilometers, Goba has an estimated population density of 57.3 people per square kilometer, which is greater than the Zone average of 27.

The 1994 national census reported a total population for this woreda of 59,028, of whom 28,362 were men and 30,666 women; 28,358 or 48.04%% of its population were urban dwellers at the time. The two largest ethnic groups reported in Goba were the Oromo (63.13%), and the Amhara (33.3%); all other ethnic groups made up 3.57% of the population. Oromiffa was spoken as a first language by 56.34%, and 42.46% spoke Amharic; the remaining 0.63% spoke all other primary languages reported. The majority of the inhabitants professed Ethiopian Orthodox Christianity, with 53.72% of the population having reported they practiced that belief, while 44.58% of the population said they were Muslim, and 1.5% were Protestant.
