= Meda Welabu =

District in Oromia Region, Ethiopia

Coordinates: 5°45′N 39°40′E

Meda Welabu is a woreda, or district, in Oromia Region, Ethiopia. Part of the Bale Zone, Meda Welabu is bordered on the south by the Ganale Dorya River which separates it from the Guji Zone, on the northwest by West Arsi Zone, on the north by Dello Menna and Harena Buluk, and on the northeast by Guradamole. The administrative center of the woreda is Bidire; other towns in Meda Welabu include Oborso.

== Overview ==
Mount Wana is the highest point in this woreda; other notable peaks include Mounts Boreda and Coromso. The lowest point is along the Welmel River, which is just under 300 meters above sea level. Other perennial rivers include the Dumal and Iyya Rivers. A survey of the land in this woreda shows that 16.9% is arable or cultivable (10% was under annual crops), 45.6% pasture, 34% forest and heavy vegetation, and the remaining 3.5% is considered swampy, degraded or otherwise unusable. Notable landmarks include Meda, which is 33 kilometers from Bidire. Wheat, barley, teff, corn, sorghum and oats are important crops. Although coffee is an important cash crop, less than 2,000 hectares are planted with it.

No industry has been reported for this woreda, although 4 wholesalers, 4 retailers and 3 service providers are licensed in Meda Welabu. Gold, silver and platinum have been reported in this woreda, but have not been commercially developed. There were 9 Farmers Associations with 4,937 members and 4 Farmers Service Cooperatives with 913 members. Meda Welabu has 75 kilometers of dry-weather road, for an average road density of 8.6 kilometers per 1000 square kilometers. About 13% of the total population has access to drinking water.

This woreda was selected by the Ministry of Agriculture and Rural Development in 2003 as one of several areas for voluntary resettlement for farmers from overpopulated areas. Together with Berbere and Gaserana Gololcha, Meda Welabu became the new home for a total of 5219 heads of households and 19,758 family members.

== Demographics ==
The 2007 national census reported a total population for this woreda of 97,532, of whom 49,059 were men and 48,473 were women; 2,989 or 3.07% of its population were urban dwellers. The majority of the inhabitants said they were Muslim, with 97.35% of the population reporting they observed this belief, while 1.6% of the population practiced Ethiopian Orthodox Christianity.

Based on figures published by the Central Statistical Agency in 2005, this woreda has an estimated total population of 85,661, of whom 42,321 were males and 43,340 were females; 2,567 or 3.00% of its population are urban dwellers, which is less than the Zone average of 13.5%. With an estimated area of 8,726.72 square kilometers, Meda Welabu has an estimated population density of 9.8 people per square kilometer, which is less than the Zone average of 27.

The 1994 national census reported a total population for this woreda of 61,919, of whom 31,494 were men and 30,425 women; 1,434 or 2.32% of its population were urban dwellers at the time. The three largest ethnic groups reported in Meda Welabu were the Oromo (97.15%), the Somali (1.77%), and the Amhara (0.8%); all other ethnic groups made up 0.28% of the population. Oromiffa was spoken as a first language by 96.67%, 1.89% spoke Somali, and 1.37% spoke Amharic; the remaining 0.07% spoke all other primary languages reported. The majority of the inhabitants were Muslim, with 97.85% of the population having reported they practiced that belief, while 1.64% of the population said they professed Ethiopian Orthodox Christianity.
