= Ginir (woreda) =

Administrative division of Ethiopia

Coordinates: 7°05′N 40°40′E

Ginir is one of the woredas in the Oromia Region of Ethiopia. It is named after the administrative center of the woreda, Ginir. Part of the East Bale Zone, Ginir is bordered on the south by the Gestro River (or Weyib River) which separates it from Goro, on the west by Sinanana Dinsho, on the northwest by Gaserana Gololcha, on the northeast by Seweyna, and on the east by Rayitu. Towns include Delo Serbo.

== Overview ==
About 15% of the area of this woreda is covered with valley, gorges and hills. Rivers include the Dinkit, Gololcha and Tebel Rivers. A survey of the land in this woreda shows that 30.5% is arable or cultivable, 31.2% pasture, 35.6% forest, and the remaining 2.7% is considered swampy, mountainous or otherwise unusable. Khat, fruits and vegetables are important cash crops. Coffee is also an important cash crop; between 2,000 and 5,000 hectares are planted with it.

Industry in the woreda includes 29 grain mills and one brick factory employing 61 people, as well as 25 wholesalers, 165 retailers and 66 service providers. There were 28 Farmers Associations and 9 Farmers Service Cooperatives. Ginir has 77 kilometers of dry-weather and 101 all-weather road, for an average of road density of 75.7 kilometers per 1000 square kilometers. About 35.6% of the total population has access to drinking water.

== Demographics ==
The 2007 national census reported a total population for this woreda of 139,495, of whom 71,323 were men and 68,172 were women; 20,196 or 14.48% of its population were urban dwellers. The majority of the inhabitants said they were Muslim, with 77.59% of the population reporting they observed this belief, while 21.53% of the population practised Ethiopian Orthodox Christianity.

Based on figures published by the Central Statistical Agency in 2005, this woreda has an estimated total population of 140,498, of whom 70,558 were males and 69,940 were females; 26,820 or 19.09% of its population are urban dwellers, which is greater than the Zone average of 13.5%. With an estimated area of 2,350.63 square kilometers, Ginir has an estimated population density of 59.8 people per square kilometer, which is greater than the Zone average of 27.

The 1994 national census reported a total population for this woreda of 97,739, of whom 48,696 were men and 49,043 women; 15,000 or 15.35% of its population were urban dwellers at the time. The three largest ethnic groups reported in Ginir were the Oromo (83.18%), the Amhara (13.31%), and the Somali (1.3%); all other ethnic groups made up 2.21% of the population. Oromiffa was spoken as a first language by 82.84%, 15.49% spoke Amharic and 1.37% spoke Somali; the remaining 0.3% spoke all other primary languages reported. The majority of the inhabitants were Muslim, with 75.1% of the population having reported they practiced that belief, while 24.45% of the population said they professed Ethiopian Orthodox Christianity.
