= Goro, Bale =

Goro is a town in southern Ethiopia. Located in the Bale Zone of the Oromia Region, this town has a longitude and latitude of 6°59′N 40°30′E and an elevation of 1650 meters above sea level. It is the administrative center of Goro woreda.

Although the town has postal service, as of 1995 it lacks electricity. Based on figures from the Central Statistical Agency in 2005, Goro has an estimated total population of 7833, of whom 3935 were males and 3898 were females.

The Guido published by the Italian government in 1938 describes Goro as a small village on the left bank of the Mena River at the foot of mount Dadimus, in a fertile and cultivated plain with plenty of water and groups of houses surrounded by hedges of euphorbia.
