= Gaturi people =

Extinct ethnic group of Ethiopia

Gaturi
Regions with significant populations

Languages
- Gaturi

Religion
- Paganism, later Islam

The Gaturi (Harari: ጋቱሪ), also spelled as Gatouri are an extinct ethnic group that once inhabited present-day eastern Ethiopia.

== History ==
According to Mohammed Hassen, the Gaturi were a Semitic-speaking people who resided in the region of Mount Kundudo, Babile, and Dawaro. Historian Merid Wolde Aregay deduced that the Gatur state language was Harari.

The Harari chronicle states Abadir arrived at an Islamic region called Balad Gatur known later as Harar in the tenth or thirteenth century. In Harar, Abadir encountered the Gaturi alongside the Harla and Argobba people. Gaturi is claimed by one source to be a Harla sub clan. According to another Harari tradition seven clans and villages united against a common adversary, including Gaturi, to form Harar city state.

According to sixteenth century Adal writer Arab Faqīh, during the Ethiopian-Adal war, one of the leaders of the Muslim forces of Malassay was Amir Husain bin Abubaker al-Gaturi. Ahmad ibn Ibrahim al-Ghazi designated Amir Husain al-Gaturi as governor of Dawaro region which was a border province of Abyssinia.

Gaturi ceased to be mentioned in texts after the sixteenth century. Gaturi is today represented as a sub group of the Harari people and remains a Harari surname.

== Language ==
They spoke Gaturi language, possibly an extinct South Ethiopic grouping within the Semitic subfamily of the Afroasiatic languages and closely related to Harari and Argobba languages.

== See also ==
- Gafat people, an extinct ethnic group in western Ethiopia
