= Abu Bakr Qecchin =

General in the Adal Sultanate

- Born: 15th Century
- Military career
- Allegiance: Adal Sultanate
- Rank: Emir
- Conflicts: Ethiopian–Adal War: Battle of Shimbra Kure; Battle of Antukyah; Battle of Zari; Battle of Bali; Battle of Saraye

Abu Bakr "the Slim" (Qecchin) also known simply as Qecchin sometimes spelt Qatin or Katchthcen was a general in the Adal Sultanate under Ahmad ibn Ibrahim al-Ghazi. Abubaker's sobriquet "Qaṭin" is derived from the Harari term for "thin". According to sixteenth century Adal writer Arab Faqīh, he was the Garad of Hubat.

== Political and military career ==
In the sixteenth century texts, Abu Bakr is described:

the emir Abu Bakr nicknamed ‘Qatin’ which means ‘the gaunt’. He was from among those renowned for their courage, and among the rare horsemen whose exploits became proverbial.

— Arab Faqīh, Futuh al-Habasha

He often accompanied the Malassay and a large army force during the Ethiopian-Adal War. Qecchin was a victim to the early Abyssinian invasion of Adal in which his mother was briefly captured at the Battle of Hubat. Qecchin led the conquest of Wofla in modern Tigray region and Kanfat in southern Begemder, after which he was appointed governor of these respective regions by Adal.
