= Dinsho (woreda) =

District in Oromia Region, Ethiopia

Coordinates: 7°10′N 39°55′E

Dinsho is one of the districts in the Oromia Region of Ethiopia. It was part of former Sinanana Dinsho woreda what was separated for Dinsho and Sinana woredas and Robe Town. Part of the Bale Zone, Sinanana Dinsho was bordered on the south by the Mena River which separated it from Goba, on the west by Adaba, on the northwest by Agarfa, on the northeast by Gaserana Gololcha, on the east by Ginir, and on the southeast by Goro, Oromia. The administrative center of this woreda is Dinsho.

== Overview ==
The altitude of the district varies from 2000 to 3600 meters above sea level, with higher elevation in the Dinsho subdistrict. Rivers include the Togona, Weyib and Shaya Rivers. A survey of the land in this woreda shows that 33.1% is arable or cultivable (29.8% was under annual crops), 30.4% pasture, 30.2% forest and other heavy vegetation, and the remaining 2.3% is considered swampy, mountainous or otherwise unusable. Sinanana Dinsho is one of the woredas in this Zone with abundant forests; the Bale Mountains National Park extends into the woreda. This woreda reportedly produces a surplus of food, and wheat and barley are important crops. There are two state farms in this woreda: the Sinana, with 38.38 square kilometers of area, and the Robe with 25.79 square kilometers.

Industry consists of 45 grain mills and 20 other small-scale factories including edible oil mills, woodworking and metalworking shops, bakeries, brickyards, knitting factories employing 166 people, as well as 172 wholesalers, 559 retailers and 231 service providers. There were 23 Farmers Associations with 16,399 members and 5 Farmers Service Cooperatives with 1884 members. Sinanana Dinsho has 93 kilometers of all-weather road, for an average of road density of 52.5 kilometers per 1000 square kilometers. About 37.7% of the total population has access to drinking water.

== Demographics ==
The 2007 national census reported a total population for this woreda of 39,124, of whom 19,252 were men and 19,872 were women; 2,966 or 7.58% of its population were urban dwellers. The majority of the inhabitants said they were Muslim, with 85.98% of the population reporting they observed this belief, while 13.65% of the population practised Ethiopian Orthodox Christianity.

Based on figures published by the Central Statistical Agency in 2005, this woreda has an estimated total population of 198,477, of whom 100,199 are men and 98,278 are women; 42,090 or 21.21% of its population are urban dwellers, which is greater than the Zone average of 13.5%. With an estimated area of 1,774.53 square kilometers, Sinanana Dinsho has an estimated population density of 111.8 people per square kilometer, which is greater than the Zone average of 27.

The 1994 national census reported a total population for this woreda of 137,354, of whom 67,983 were men and 69,371 women; 23,535 or 17.13% of its population were urban dwellers at the time. The two largest ethnic groups reported in Sinanana Dinsho were the Oromo (89.73%), and the Amhara (9.02%); all other ethnic groups made up 1.25% of the population. Oromiffa was spoken as a first language by 88.6%, and 10.75% spoke Amharic; the remaining 0.65% spoke all other primary languages reported. The majority of the inhabitants were Muslim, with 61.92% of the population having reported they practiced that belief, while 37.37% of the population said they professed Ethiopian Orthodox Christianity.
