= Sheikh Hussein (saint) =

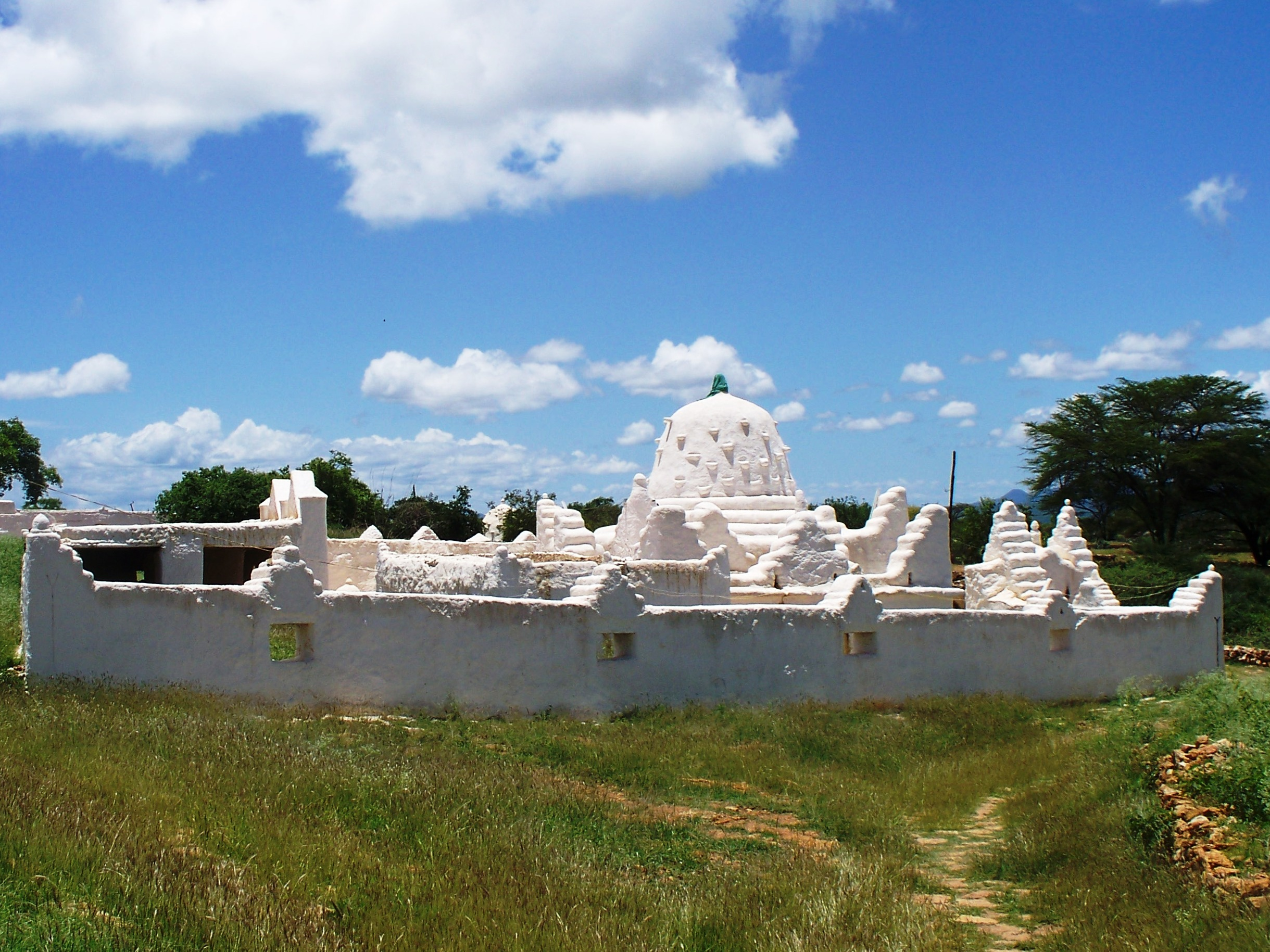
- Sheikh Hussein's shrine in the town of Sheikh Hussein.
- Born: Merca, Somalia
- Died: Sheikh Hussein, Ethiopia
- Occupation: Scholar
- Title: Sheikh

Sheikh Hussein was a 13th-century Somali Muslim proselytizer who lived in Ethiopia and was from the famous port town of Merca in Somalia, one of the power jurisdictions and cultural centers of the Ajuran Sultanate. He is now honored as a saint.

== History ==
Hussein was born in Merca, and was Somali from the Ajuran clan. He is credited for introducing Islam to the Sidamo people living in Ethiopia. He is also credited for founding and establishing the Sultanate of Bale and is said to have performed many miracles. A number of these feats have been recorded in a hagiography published in Cairo in the 1920s, entitled Rabi` al-Qulub. He gave his name to the town of Sheikh Hussein, which is now within the homelands of the Oromo people. The city is a popular destination for approximately 50,000 Muslim pilgrims from various parts of Ethiopia, who congregate there twice a year during the Islamic months of Hajj and Rabi' al-Awwal. The first pilgrimage in February–March is to celebrate Sheikh Hussein's birth; the second in August–September is to commemorate his death. The pilgrims traditionally carry cleft sticks known as "Oulle Sheikh Hussein", which are too small to serve as walking sticks and are not utilized for any practical purpose. Once they arrive at the shrine, the pilgrims take their turn entering the saint's tomb by crawling through a small doorway.
