= Agarfa =

District in Oromia Region, Ethiopia

Coordinates: 7°20′N 39°20′E

Agarfa is a woreda in Oromia Region, Ethiopia, named for its administrative center, Agarfa. Located in the northwestern corner of the Bale Zone, Agarfa is bordered on the south by Sinanana Dinsho, on the west by west Arsi zone, on the north by the Shabelle River which separates it from the Arsi Zone, and on the east by Gaserana Gololcha. Other towns in Agarfa include Ali, Agarfa town, Ambentu.

== Overview ==
Rivers in this woreda include the Weyib, Wabe, Wuchuma, Chorina, Chocha Inzira, Malka Kari and the Makala. A survey of the land in this woreda shows that 61% is covered by the plains of the southeastern and western parts, 31% by the gorge of the Shabelle River and related rugged terrain, and the remaining 8% is covered by the mountain range in the southwest. 152.65 square kilometres of land is covered by forest, and 9.83 square kilometers by man-made forest owned by the government. Notable landmarks include Goda Gimbam, Goda Hora caves, and the Sheik Ali Mountain, which are considered religious sanctuaries by residents of this woreda. Linseed, sugar cane, fruits, khat and vegetables are important cash crops.

Industry in the woreda includes 20 grain mills, edible oil mills and one knitting factory employing 77 people, as well as 38 wholesalers, 175 retailers and 53 service providers. There were 14 Farmers Associations with 8,347 members and 3 Farmers Service Cooperatives with 941 members. Agarfa has 17 kilometers of dry-weather and 42 all-weather road, for an average of road density of 48.6 kilometers per 1000 square kilometers. About 35% of the total population has access to drinking water.

== Demographics ==
The 2007 national census reported a total population for this woreda of 102,110, of whom 52,136 were men and 49,974 were women; 12,907 or 12.64% of its population were urban dwellers. The majority of the inhabitants said they were Muslim, with 52.7% of the population reporting they observed this belief, while 47.3% of the population practised Ethiopian Orthodox Christianity.

Based on figures published by the Central Statistical Agency in 2005, this woreda has an estimated total population of 94,584, of whom 47,761 are men and 46,823 are women; 13,246 or 14.00% of its population are urban dwellers, which is greater than the Zone average of 13.5%. With an estimated area of 1,213.28 square kilometers, Agarfa has an estimated population density of 78 people per square kilometer, which is greater than the Zone average of 27.

The 1994 national census reported a total population for this woreda of 66,610, of whom 33,059 were men and 33,551 women; 7,410 or 11.12% of its population were urban dwellers at the time. The two largest ethnic groups reported in Agarfa were Oromo (96.46%), and Amhara (3.22%); all other ethnic groups made up 0.86% of the population. Oromiffa was spoken as a first language by 95.47%, and 4.21% spoke Amharic; the remaining 0.32% spoke all other primary languages reported. The majority of the inhabitants were Muslim, with 52.7% of the population having reported they practiced that belief, while 47.3% of the population said they professed Ethiopian Orthodox Christianity.

== Notable people ==
- Hajii Mohammad Sheekaa
- Hajii Ibrahim Bekeruu
- Hajii Abdaa Qaabatoo
- Hajii Aloo Aadam
- Mekonen Mekuria
- shech /Haji Kemal Tola
- Hajii Hasan Tilmoo
- Ibrahim Jeyilan (world Athletics)
- Mohammed Tola ( Al- Jazeera channel journalist)
- Demere Legese
