= Al-Omari =

The al-Omari (also spelt Alomari or el-Umari or Omary) (Arabic: العمري) is an Arab clan belonging to the Quraysh tribe that is descended from Umar, the second caliph, or leader, of the Rashidun Caliphate. Al-Omariyya emigrated from Mecca to Palestine and Mosul, Iraq, and were distributed throughout the Levant, Egypt, and Yemen. Al-Omariyya is a large Arab tribe rooted in history, one of the largest clans in Jordan and Palestine. It led Irbid for a period of time from the main clans of northern Jordan. They are a descendant of the Banu Adi bin Ka’b from Quraish, and they are the sons of Umar from the clans of the Hashemite Kingdom of Jordan. The largest in number, their homes extend from Irbid Governorate to Mafraq Governorate, all the way to the Zarqa Governorate district.
