= Welmel River =

River in Ethiopia

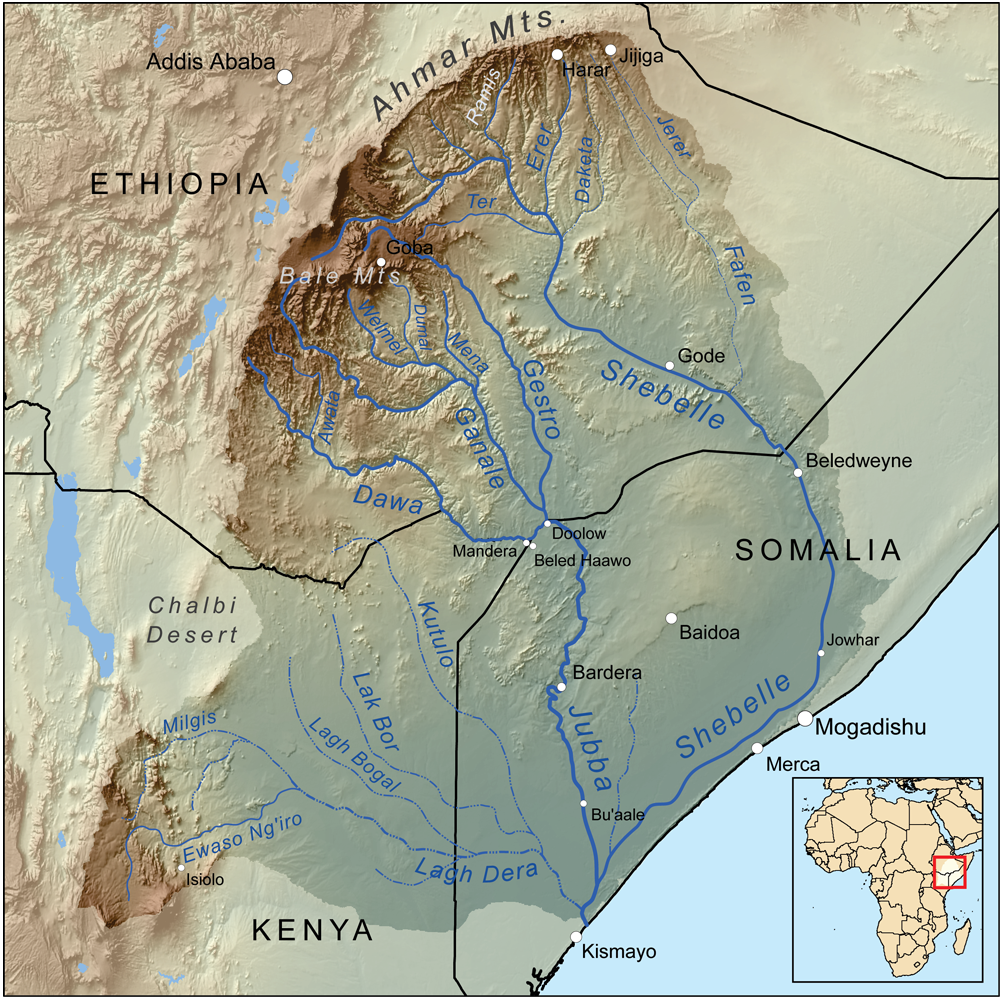
- Map of the Jubba Basin, with the Welmel in the upper centre

Location
- Country: Ethiopia
- Regions: Oromia, Somali

Physical characteristics
- Source: Bale Mountains
  - coordinates: 6°52′43″N 39°44′33″E
  - elevation: 3,927 m (12,884 ft)
- Mouth: Ganale Dorya River
  - coordinates: 5°40′52″N 40°56′09″E
  - elevation: 302 m (991 ft)
- Length: 311 km (193 mi)
- Basin size: 15,085 km^{2} (5,824 sq mi)
- Discharge
  - location: Mouth
  - average: 33.41 m^{3}/s (1,180 cu ft/s)
  - minimum: 10.15 m^{3}/s (358 cu ft/s)
  - maximum: 82.68 m^{3}/s (2,920 cu ft/s)

Basin features
- Progression: Ganale Dorya → Jubba → Somali Sea
- River system: Jubba Basin
- Population: 389,000
- Tributaries
  - left: Dumal

The Welmel is a river of eastern Ethiopia. It is a tributary of the Ganale Dorya River, which in turn is a tributary of the Jubba River. The headwaters of the Welmel are in the Bale Mountains of the Ethiopian Highlands, and it flow southeast for 311 km (193 mi) to its mouth.

== See also ==
- List of rivers of Ethiopia
