= Sinana =

District in Oromia, Ethiopia

Sinana is one of the woredas in the Oromia Region of Ethiopia. It was part of former Sinanana Dinsho woreda. It is part of the Bale Zone.

== Demographics ==
The 2007 national census reported a total population for this woreda of 118,594, of whom 61,968 were men and 56,626 were women; none of its population were urban dwellers. The majority of the inhabitants said they were Muslim, with 59.99% of the population reporting they observed this belief, while 38.93% of the population practised Ethiopian Orthodox Christianity.
