= Coastline of Somalia =

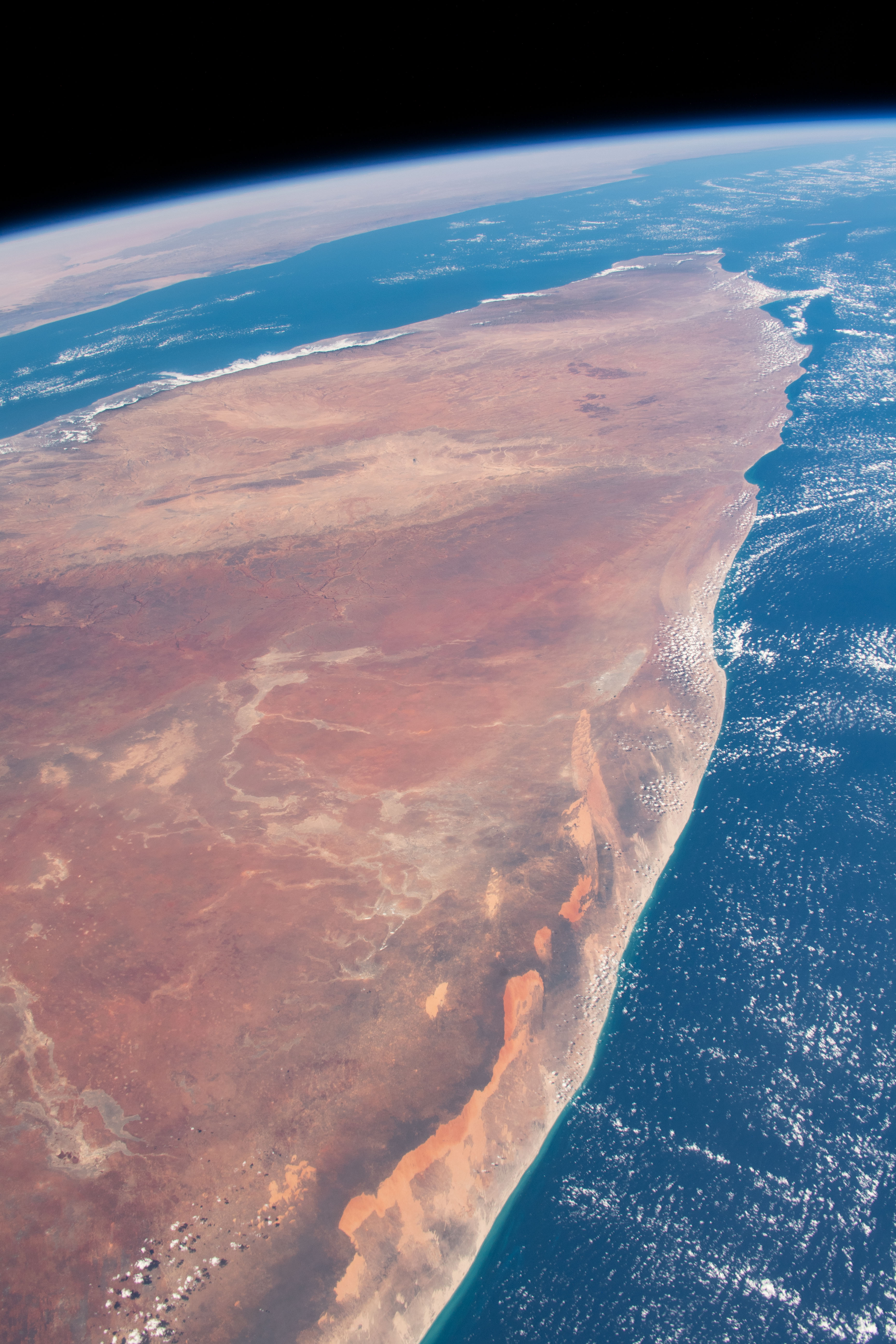
Northern part of Somalia's coast, as seen from space.

Somalia's coastline consists of the Gulf of Aden to the north, the Guardafui Channel to the northeast and the Indian Ocean to the east. The total length of the coastline is approximately 3333 km, giving the country the longest coastline on mainland Africa. The country has the second-longest coastline in all of Africa, behind the island nation of Madagascar (4828 km).

The coastline is generally divided into two parts, northern and eastern coastlines, separated by the tip of the Horn of Africa known as Cape Guardafui. The city of Mogadishu, the capital of Somalia, is situated in the south of the country along the eastern coastline. The northern coastline is shared with the Gulf of Aden, the northeastern with the Guardafui Channel, and the eastern with the Indian Ocean. The coastline plays a major role in maintaining the economy of the country through fishing and trade; meanwhile, other areas of the economy are less productive. The northern tip of the coastline meets Djibouti in the west and the eastern tip meets Kenya in the south. There are a number of islands near the coastal areas. Ras Caseyr (Cape Guardafui) is the easternmost point of Somalia; this point joins the Guardafui Channel to the Gulf of Aden.

== Geographical features ==
The coastline of Somalia has different conditions throughout its length. Being the second-longest in Africa, this coastline is the easternmost coastline of continental Africa, comprises part of the north-western coastline of the Indian Ocean, and is the nearest coastline to the Socotra Islands, which are part of Yemen. Its continental shelf spreads over 32,500 km^{2}. The northern coastline extends from Djibouti to the east of Somalia, and the eastern coastline extends from the north-east to the south-west of Somalia, touching Kenya.

== Territorial disputes over the coastline ==
Territorial disputes over the coastline of Somalia are driven by competition for offshore resources, including oil, gas, and fisheries, as well as geostrategic maritime access. A primary international conflict involved approximately 100,000 square kilometres of the Indian Ocean contested by Kenya In October 2021, the International Court of Justice (ICJ) largely ruled in favor of Somalia, establishing a new maritime boundary based on the equidistance principle. Kenya rejected the ruling, characterizing the process as biased and refusing to recognize the court's jurisdiction Regional tensions escalated further in January 2024 following a Memorandum of Understanding (MOU) between Ethiopia and the breakaway region of Somaliland. The agreement proposed leasing 20 km of coastline to Ethiopia for a naval base in exchange for Ethiopia's formal recognition of Somaliland’s independence The Federal Government of Somalia nullified the deal, citing a violation of its sovereignty, and sought military support from allies such as Turkey and Egypt. Internally, coastal control is complicated by the Puntland–Somaliland dispute over the Sool and Sanaag regions, and ongoing friction between the federal government and autonomous states like Jubaland regarding offshore resource management and revenue-sharing frameworks.

=== Somaliland dispute ===
A geographic map of Somaliland.

The status of Somaliland represents a central node in Somalia's coastal disputes, particularly regarding maritime sovereignty and port commercialization. Although the international community largely recognizes Somaliland as part of Somalia, the region has operated with de facto independence since 1991, aggressively seeking foreign investment and diplomatic recognition. The United Arab Emirates's DP World has been a pivotal player, investing hundreds of millions of dollars to develop the Port of Berbera, a move the Federal Government of Somalia has historically challenged as an infringement on its national authority over trade and borders. While official diplomatic recognition from Israel has not been formally finalized, Israeli officials have expressed a strategic interest in Somaliland due to its location on the Red Sea, and Somaliland representatives have frequently signaled a willingness to establish ties with Jerusalem in exchange for recognition. These external relationships, particularly the 2024 Ethiopian port deal, continue to fuel friction between Mogadishu and Hargeisa, as the federal government views such bilateral maritime agreements as "illegal" and a threat to its territorial integrity.

== Major Ports of Somalia ==
Somalia's coastline on the Gulf of Aden and the Indian Ocean features several major ports critical for trade, humanitarian aid, and local economies, often shaped by the country's complex political landscape.

=== Port of Mogadishu ===
The Port of Mogadishu is the official seaport of Somalia's capital and the largest harbor in the country. Located on the southeastern coast, it handles approximately 80% of the nation's containerized cargo. The port is operated under a public-private partnership by the Turkish Albayrak Group on behalf of the Somali Port Authority and underwent a significant $80 million modernization project to expand its capacity.

=== Port of Berbera ===
The Port of Berbera is a strategic deep-water port on the northern coast of the Gulf of Aden. Operated by the Emirati global logistics company DP World under an agreement with the government of Somaliland, it serves as a key gateway for landlocked Ethiopia. A major expansion, including a new container terminal, has tripled its capacity to 500,000 twenty-foot equivalent units (TEUs) and is central to the adjacent Berbera Economic Zone (BEZ).

=== Port of Bossaso (Bender Qaasim) ===
Port of Bossaso, also known as Bender Qaasim, is the major seaport for the Puntland region on the southern Gulf of Aden. Managed by P&O Ports (DP World) under a 30-year concession, it has undergone significant dredging and quay extension. Historically a center for livestock exports to the Arabian Peninsula, the port has been developed into a modern multi-purpose logistics hub.

=== Port of Kismayo ===
The Port of Kismayo is a major class port on the southern coast, serving the Jubaland region. Managed by the Kismayo Port Company (KPC) under a concession, it handles container, bulk, and general cargo. Originally built in the 1960s to export agricultural products, it now offers integrated logistics and container freight station services to support regional trade.

=== Port of Las Qoray ===
Las Qoray is a historic port on the Gulf of Aden in the contested Sanaag region. A former capital of the Warsangali Sultanate, it was once known for its tuna canning factory. Currently administered by Puntland but claimed by Somaliland, the port is classified as a jetty and has been the subject of redevelopment plans aimed at reviving its local economy.

=== Port of Merca ===
The Port of Merca, located about 70 kilometers southwest of Mogadishu on the Indian Ocean, is a jetty-class port. Developed under Italian colonial rule as a primary export point for bananas, it was historically known as "Porto bananiero." Its infrastructure was heavily damaged during the civil war, and it now primarily serves small fishing vessels and very limited local trade.

== Biodiversity ==
Coastal Somalia is rich in biodiversity; its ecosystem is known as the "Somali Current Large Marine Ecosystem". Sixty-three species of corals belonging to 27 genera are found near the Bajuni archipelago. Small cetaceans, dolphins (common dolphins, spinner dolphins, spotted dolphins, humpback dolphins, bottlenose dolphins, etc.), turtles (loggerhead, hawksbill, olive ridley, leatherback, green, etc.), six species of mangrove (mainly Avicennia marina), and seagrasses (mainly Thalassodendron ciliatum) are also found there.
