= Dawaro =

Muslim principality near Hadiya, Africa

Dawaro (Harari: ደዋሮ Dawāro) was a Muslim principality which laid near Hadiya. The state was originally independent until becoming a vassal and later a province due its subjugation by Emperor Amda Seyon I in the early 14th century. The region was situated east of Hadiya and north of Bali which covered much of Ethiopia's Arsi Province. The capital of Dawaro was called Sabboch. The area became prone to a tug of war between Muslim and Christian states in the Middle Ages.

== History ==
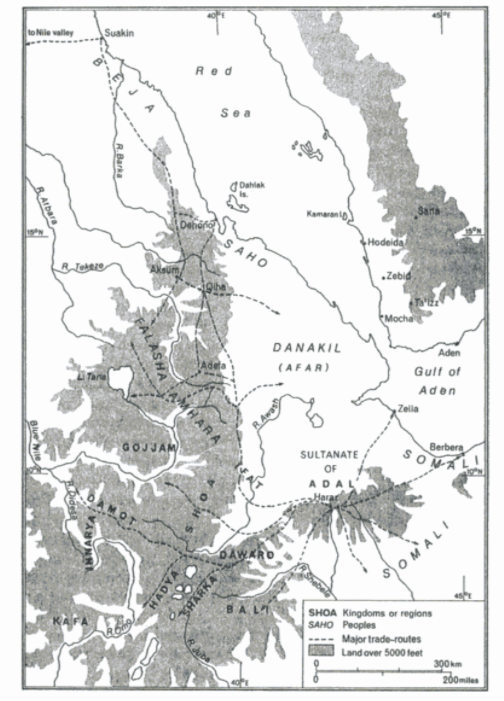
Medieval map of peoples, kingdoms and regions alongside major trade routes in the Horn

The earliest mention of this province comes from the Royal Chronicle of Emperor Amda Seyon. After occupying Ifat, Amda Seyon then proceeded to garrison Dawaro. However, in the late 1320s the ruler of the province, Haydara, ended up siding with Sabr ad-Din I during his rebellion and "treacherously" executed some of the Emperor's messengers. Amda Seyon, incensed by this act of rebellion, at once set out with his troops. On reaching Dawaro he "laid waste the country from one end to the other". He killed young men, took women and children prisoners, seized livestock "without number" and "destroyed the crops of their country". The "wicked plans of Haydara" of Dawaro were thus "brought to nothing" as the chronicler states. Dawaro was then grouped together with other kingdoms such as Hadiya, Fatagar and Ifat as a tributary kingdom to the Ethiopian Empire under the leadership of Jamal Ad-Din I.

According to the Egyptian historian, Ibn Fadlallah al-Umari, Dawaro was measured five days journey by two or 100 kilometers by 40. It was much smaller than Ifat, but resembled it in that it produced cereals and fruits, and reared horses and beasts of burden. Trade however was less developed. A type of "primitive currency" called hakunas was used which were pieces of iron as long as a needle. A cow would cost 5,000 hakunas, a goat 3,000 hakunas. The social customs of Dawaro were also very similar to that of Ifat, Dawaro was inhabited by Muslims following the Hanafi school. Christian proselytization of the locals reached a high level of intensity during the reign of Dawit I, who then encouraged the settlement of Ethiopian military colonists to the peripheral province. However, the Ethiopian troops stationed in the region were in constant danger as their positions soon came under the attacks of Sultan Jamal ad-Din II.

Emperor Zara Yaqob consolidated the supremacy of the Christian empire in Dawaro and appointed Fitawrari Barje as governor of the province. Dawaro was soon invaded by the Adal Sultan Badlay ibn Sa'ad ad-Din who faced the forces of Zara Yaqob at the Battle of Gomit, but he was defeated and killed. Following Na'od's defeat by Imam Mahfuz, the Adalites briefly controlled Dawaro until the reign of emperor Dawit II, who would recapture the territories for the Abyssinians.

The next time Dawaro is mentioned is in the Futuh al-Habasa, the history of the conquests of Imam Ahmad ibn Ibrahim al-Ghazi. The province of Dawaro, because of its location to the east and its relative proximity to the Adal Sultanate became the first part of the empire to be confronted by the forces of Imam Ahmad. The Imam carried out a raid on the province in 1526-7 from his base in Sim. His men (the Malassay) according to the Lebna Dengel chronicles were said to have taken considerable loot such as horses, slaves and sheep. The Adalites planned to return to their country, but the "infidels of Dawaro" assembled a large army against them, this force was subsequently defeated. Not long after this Emperor Dawit II received news of an impending larger invasion of Dawaro, the Emperor assembled a large army that consisted of units from all over the country. This army was defeated in the disastrous Battle of Shimbra Kure, but the Imam later returned back to Harar. In the summer of 1531, the Adalites returned to Dawaro where they occupied the province, they soon ravaged the province and destroyed a large church that was erected by the Emperor's predecessor. The Imam then arrived at a settlement called Geberge and demanded that all of the Christian inhabitants either convert to Islam or pay the jizya tax. Most of the inhabitants choose to retain their religion by declaring their neutrality and agreeing to pay the tax, others agreed to be converted, among those converted were 50 Christian nobles. The Imam, much pleased with their conversion, appointed Amir Husain al-Gaturi as governor of the province.

Control of the province would later fall under Ahmad's nephew, Vizier Abbas, who ruled over Dawaro as well as neighboring Fatager and Bali. Following the Imam's death and defeat at Wanya Daga, Abbas launched a fierce attack on a number of Christian towns. The young Emperor, Gelawdewos, made his way to confront him and Abbas rushed with his army to meet the Emperor. Gelawdewos was entirely victorious in this engagement and Abbas with all his captains were killed. The remaining Muslims who had survived the battle became the target of the local Christian populace who massacred all those who they could find. The Emperor then appointed Khalid, a Christian who had converted to Islam but that had reverted back to Christianity, as the provincial governor of Dawaro. Gelawdewos later faced problems with the Portuguese, he then banished 140 of them to the province of Dawaro. The presence of the Portuguese greatly displeased Khalid, he therefore ordered them to be killed or expelled from the province. Khalid attempted to ambush the Portuguese with a large army, but as soon as the assault began they shot and killed Khalid, after which most of his supporters would become their vassals. The Emperor was said to be very pleased with this outcome as he had always distrusted the governor.

After the death of Khalid, the Portuguese would rule Dawaro for four months until the province was invaded by the Oromos. The Emperor warned the Portuguese of an impending Oromo attack. The Portuguese would immediately prepare to face this attack by stockpiling on munitions and gunpowder. When the Oromos did arrive they were "innumerable, and did not come on without order like barbarians, but advanced collected in bodies, like squadrons". The Portuguese fought the Oromos for around 11 to 12 days according to Joao Bermudes until they ran out of gunpower and ammunition. Before they withdrew from Dawaro, Bermudes claims that all of the country's inhabitants were safely evacuated. Just after the Portuguese had fled from the province, they soon met up with Gelawdewos who was on his way to support the Portuguese defense. The Emperor was said to have "wept like a child" after hearing about the fall of Dawaro and said "My sin is great that such evil has befallen me."

The chronicle from the nineteenth century regarding the Emirate of Harar notes that Garads and Malaks, who served as representatives of the Emirate, were in attendance in Dawaro.

== Inhabitants ==
According to Guinean historian Djibril Niane, it is probable that the Argobba, Wolane, Silt'e, and Harari peoples inhabited this region. Historian Mohammed Hassen links Dawaro as being partly the territory of the Gaturi people. Austrian scholar Philipp Paulitschke equated the region with the Jeberti people, ancestors of the Harla, Afar, and Somali Darod/Ogaden clans.

== See also ==
- Sultanate of Ifat
