= Ganale Doria River =

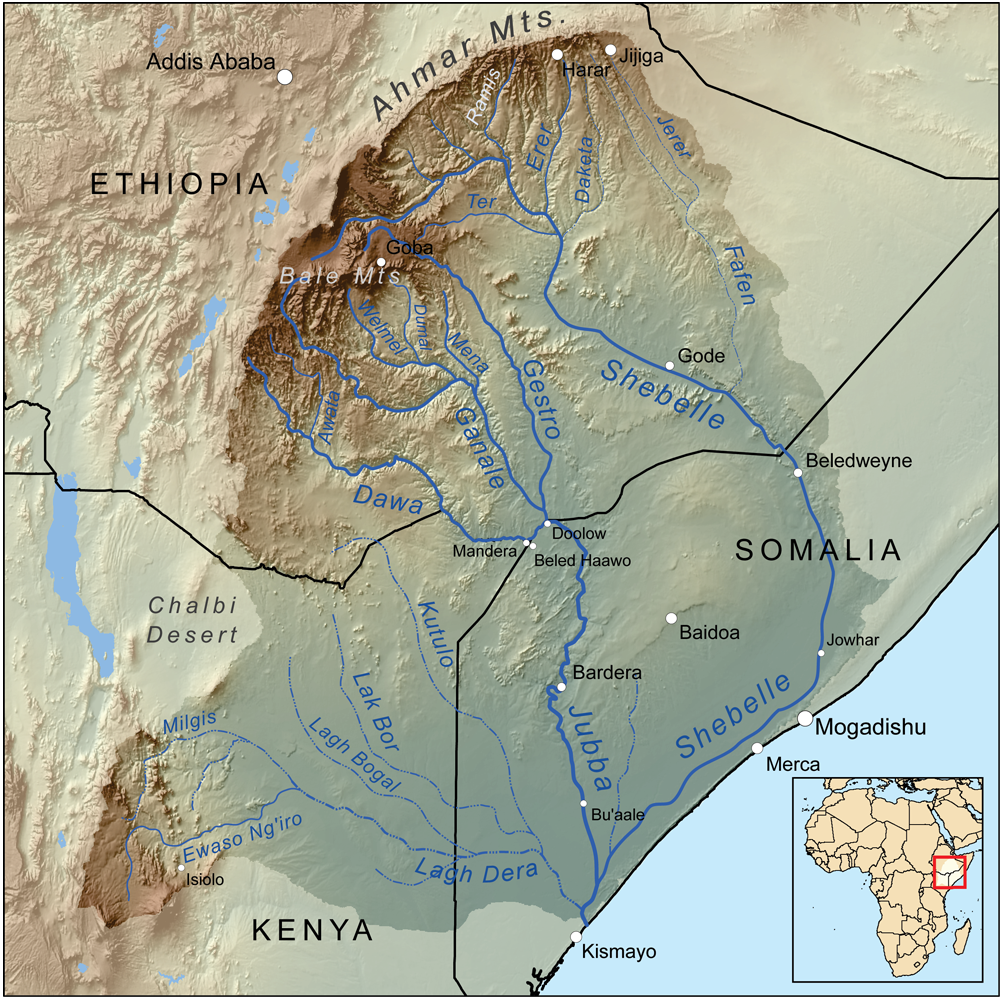
- Map of the Jubba/Shebelle drainage basin
- Native name: Webiga Janaale (Somali)

Location
- Country: Ethiopia
- Regions: Oromia, Somali, Sidama

Physical characteristics
- Source
  - location: Ethiopian Highlands
  - coordinates: 6°48′27″N 39°07′21″E
  - elevation: 3,479 m (11,414 ft)
- Mouth: Jubba River
  - location: Near Dolo, at Ethiopia–Somalia border
  - coordinates: 4°10′42″N 42°04′48″E
  - elevation: 175 m (574 ft)
- Length: 858 km (533 mi)
- Basin size: 82,600 km^{2} (31,900 sq mi)
- Discharge
  - location: Mouth
  - average: 241.5 m^{3}/s (8,530 cu ft/s)
  - minimum: 56.2 m^{3}/s (1,980 cu ft/s)
  - maximum: 531.6 m^{3}/s (18,770 cu ft/s)

Basin features
- Progression: Jubba → Somali Sea
- River system: Jubba Basin
- Population: 3,940,000
- Tributaries
  - left: Welmel, Mena, Weyib
- Waterbodies: GD-3 Power Station Reservoir

The Ganale Doria River (Somali: Webiga Janaale) (also transliterated as Genale Dorya) is a perennial river in southeastern Ethiopia. Rising in the mountains east of Aleta Wendo, the Ganale flows south and east to join with the Dawa at the border with Somalia to become the Jubba. The river's tributaries include the Welmel, Weyib (also known as Gestro), and Mena. The Del Verme Falls is a notable feature of its middle course.

According to materials published by the Ethiopian Central Statistical Agency, the Ganale has a total length of 858 km (533 mi). The Ethiopian Ministry of Water Resources, describes the catchment area of the Ganale Dorya-Dawa river basin as 82,600 km^{2} (31,900 sq mi) in size, with an annual runoff of 5.80 billion cubic metres (205×10^{9} cu ft), and specific discharge of 1.2 litres per second (0.042 cu ft/s) per square kilometre. The catchment area is estimated as having the potential to irrigate 1,070 km^{2} (410 sq mi), and to generate 9270 gigawatt-hours per year.

The river Ganale was renamed Ganale Doria by the Italian explorer Vittorio Bottego after the Italian biologist Giacomo Doria.

The Ganale Doria is historically important because it served as the boundary between Sidamo and Bale Provinces. The confluence of the Ganale Doria with the Dawa is notable as the former starting point for the boundary between Ethiopia and Kenya to the west, and the starting point for the boundary between Ethiopia and Somalia to the east. In 1936, the Battle of Ganale Doria was fought to the south of the river's course.
