= Mena River =

River in eastern Ethiopia

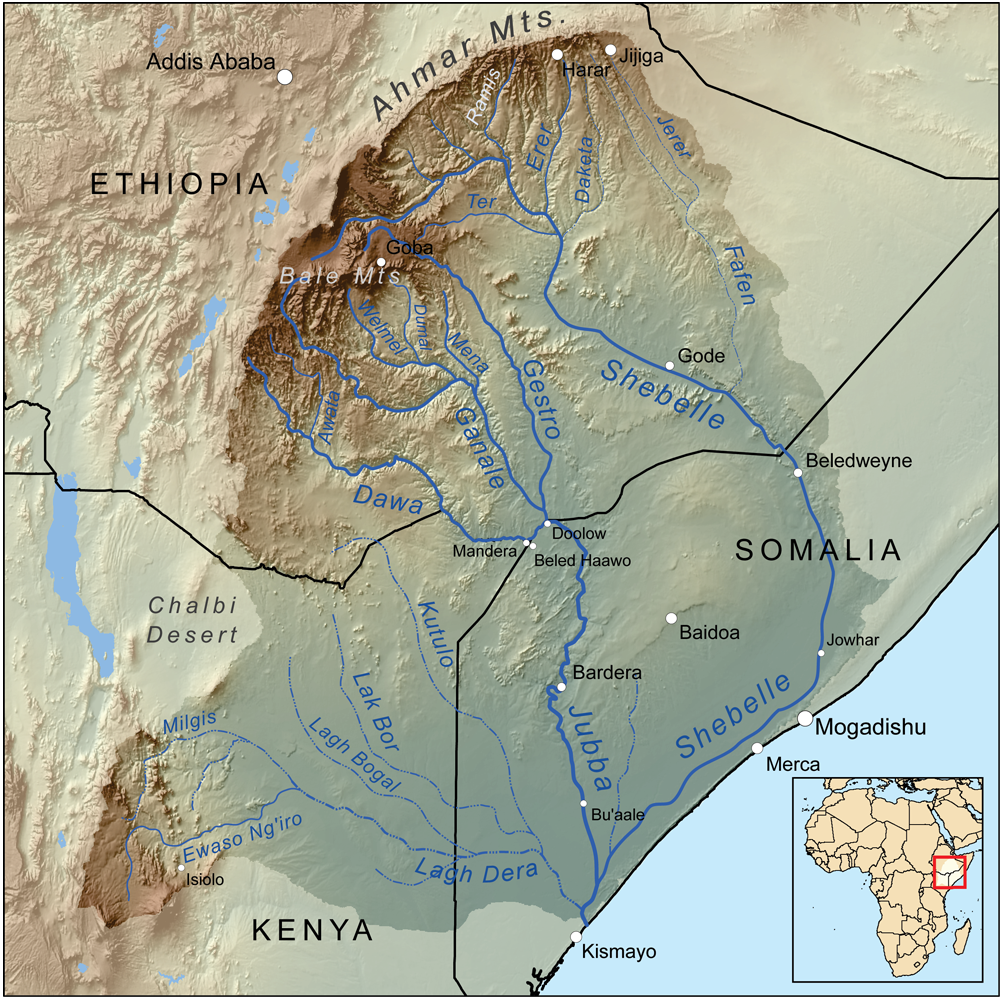
- The Mena River shown as a tributary of the Ganale River in Bale Zone, eastern Ethiopia

Location
- Country: Ethiopia
- Regions: Oromia, Somali

Physical characteristics
- Source
  - location: Bale Mountains
  - coordinates: 6°55′52″N 40°11′27″E
  - elevation: 3,101 m (10,174 ft)
- Mouth: Ganale Dorya River
  - coordinates: 5°32′30″N 41°10′59″E
  - elevation: 280 m (920 ft)
- Length: 298 km (185 mi)
- Basin size: 9,081 km^{2} (3,506 sq mi)
- Discharge
  - location: Mouth
  - average: 35.1 m^{3}/s (1,240 cu ft/s)
  - minimum: 6.96 m^{3}/s (246 cu ft/s)
  - maximum: 109.2 m^{3}/s (3,860 cu ft/s)

Basin features
- Progression: Ganale Dorya → Jubba → Somali Sea
- River system: Jubba Basin
- Population: 206,000

The Mena is a river of eastern Ethiopia. It is located in the Delo Menna woreda in Bale Zone, Oromia Region. Its source lies in the Bale Mountains. It is a tributary of the Ganale Dorya.
