= Afromontane =

Subregion of the Afrotropical realm

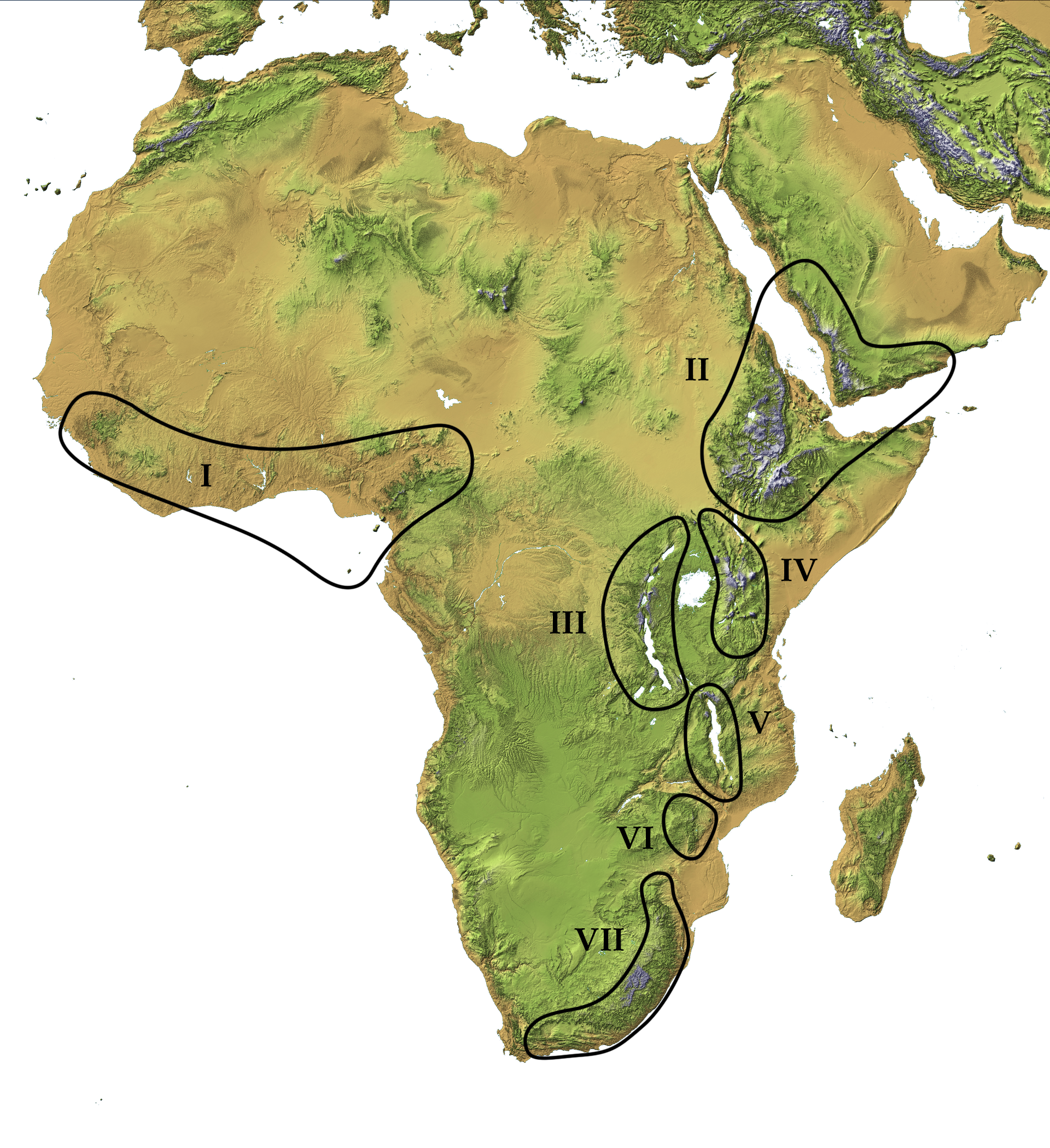
Afromontane Zones. I. West African and Cameroon highlands, II. Ethiopian and Arabian highlands, III. Western (Albertine) Rift, IV. Eastern Rift. V. Southern Rift, VI. Eastern Highlands, VII. Drakensberg

The Afromontane regions are subregions of the Afrotropical realm, one of the Earth's eight biogeographic realms, covering the plant and animal species found in the mountains of Africa and the southern Arabian Peninsula. The Afromontane regions of Africa are discontinuous, separated from each other by lower-lying areas, and are sometimes referred to as the Afromontane archipelago, as their distribution is analogous to a series of sky islands.

== Geography ==
Afromontane communities occur above 1,500–2,000 metres (4,900–6,600 ft) elevation near the equator, and as low as 300 metres (980 ft) elevation in the Knysna-Amatole montane forests of South Africa. Afromontane forests are generally cooler and more humid than the surrounding lowlands.

The Afromontane archipelago mostly follows the East African Rift from the Red Sea to Zimbabwe, with the largest areas in the Ethiopian Highlands, the Albertine Rift Mountains of Uganda, Rwanda, Burundi, Democratic Republic of the Congo, and Tanzania, and the Eastern Arc highlands of Kenya and Tanzania. Other Afromontane regions include the Drakensberg range of southern Africa, the Cameroon Highlands, and the Cameroon Line volcanoes, including Mount Cameroon, Bioko, and São Tomé.

== Flora ==
Although some Afromontane enclaves are widely separated, they share a similar mix of plant species which are often distinct from the surrounding lowland regions. Podocarps, of genera Podocarpus and Afrocarpus, are a characteristic tree, along with Prunus africana, Hagenia abyssinica, Juniperus procera, and Olea spp.. In the higher mountains, the Afromontane forest or woodland zone transitions to a higher Afroalpine zone of grasslands, shrublands, or moorlands.

The plant families Curtisiaceae and Oliniaceae are Afromontane endemics and family Barbeyaceae is a near-endemic. The tree genera Afrocrania, Balthasaria, Curtisia, Ficalhoa, Hagenia, Kiggelaria, Kuloa, Leucosidea, Platypterocarpus, Trichocladus, Widdringtonia, and Xymalos are Afromontane endemics or near-endemics, as are the plant genera Ardisiandra, Cincinnobotrys, and Stapfiella.

=== Plant communities ===
Afromontane areas have a wide range of plant communities, including intermediate types. These include:

- Afromontane rain forest. Afromontane rain forest is found on wetter slopes from southern Ethiopia to Malawi, mostly between 1200 and 2500 meters elevation. It occurs on wetter slopes where average annual rainfall is from 1250 to 2500 mm, or higher. Elevation and location varies somewhat based on distance from the equator or from the sea, and the size and configuration of the highland where it occurs. Mature rain forests generally have an upper stratum of trees 25 to 45 meters high, a middle stratum 14 to 30 meters high, a lower stratum 6 to 15 meters high, a shrub layer of 3 to 6 meters high, and a sparse herbaceous ground layer. The tree crowns of the upper strata are typically open, and the middle strata may be continuous but rarely forms a dense canopy, while the lower tree stratum is typically dense. Most trees are evergreen. Afromontane rain forests can be similar in structure to lowland Guineo-Congolian rain forests, but the species mostly differ from lowland forests. Typical trees include Aningeria adolfi-friederici, Cola greenwayi, Cylicomorpha parviflora, Diospyros abyssinica, Drypetes gerrardii, Entandrophragma excelsum, Ficalhoa laurifolia, Gambeya gorungosana, Kuloa usambarensis, Mitragyna rubrostipulata, Myrianthus holstii, Ochna holstii, Olea capensis, Parinari excelsa, Podocarpus milanjianus, Prunus africana, Strombosia scheffleri, Syzygium guineense subsp. afromontanum, Tabernaemontana johnstonii, and Xymalos monospora. Tree ferns (Cyathea spp.), lianas, and epiphytes, including ferns, mosses, and species of Begonia, Impatiens, Streptocarpus, and Peperomia, are abundant.

== Distribution ==
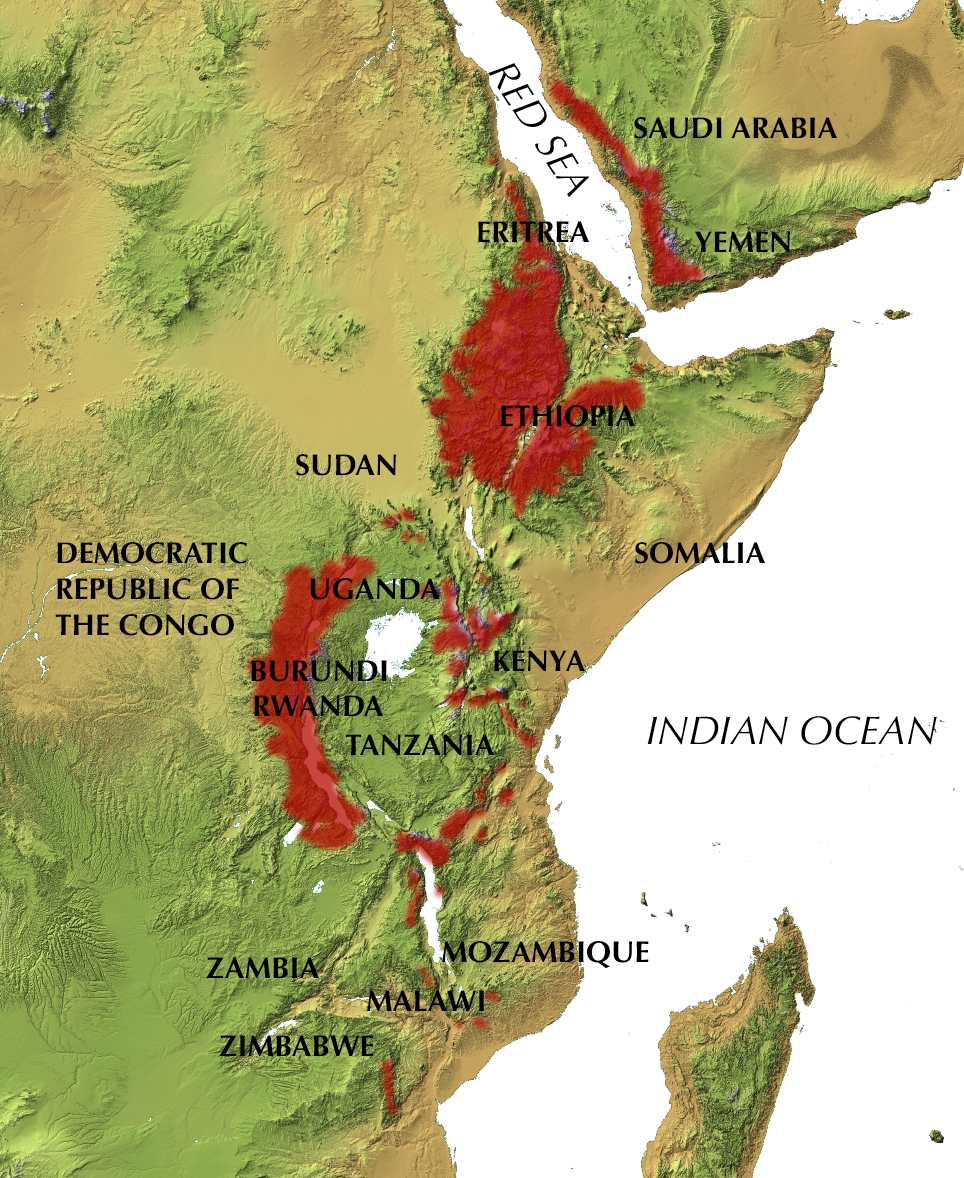
Eastern Afromontane biodiversity hotspot

In South Africa, Afromontane forests cover only 0.5% of the country's land area. The Afromontane forests occur along the mountainous arc of the Drakensberg Range, from Limpopo Province in the northeast to the Western Cape Province in the southwest. The Afromontane forests generally occur in well-watered areas, including ravines and south-facing slopes. The Afromontane forests are intolerant of fire, and the frequent fires of the surrounding fynbos, savanna, and grassland limit the expansion of the forests. Despite their small area, the Afromontane forests of South Africa produce valuable timber, particularly the real yellowwood (Podocarpus latifolius), Outeniqua yellowwood (Afrocarpus falcatus), and stinkwood (Ocotea bullata).

== Afromontane ecoregions ==
Tropical and subtropical moist broadleaf forests

- Albertine Rift montane forests (Democratic Republic of the Congo, Burundi, Rwanda, Tanzania, Uganda)
- Cameroonian Highlands forests (Cameroon, Nigeria)
- East African montane forests (Kenya, South Sudan, Tanzania, Uganda)
- Eastern Arc forests (Tanzania, Kenya)
- Ethiopian montane forests (Djibouti, Eritrea, Ethiopia, Somalia, Sudan)
- Guinean montane forests (Guinea, Côte d'Ivoire, Liberia, Sierra Leone)
- Knysna-Amatole montane forests (South Africa)
- Southern Afrotemperate Forest (Western Cape Province of South Africa)
- Mount Cameroon and Bioko montane forests (Cameroon, Equatorial Guinea)

Montane grasslands, shrublands, and woodlands

- Angolan montane forest-grassland mosaic (Angola)
- Angolan scarp savanna and woodlands (Angola)
- Drakensberg alti-montane grasslands and woodlands (Lesotho, South Africa)
- Drakensberg montane grasslands, woodlands and forests (Lesotho, South Africa, Eswatini)
- East African montane moorlands (Kenya, South Sudan, Tanzania, Uganda)
- Eastern Zimbabwe montane forest-grassland mosaic (Mozambique, Zimbabwe)
- Ethiopian montane grasslands and woodlands (Eritrea, Ethiopia)
- Ethiopian montane moorlands (Ethiopia)
- Highveld grasslands (Lesotho, South Africa)
- Jos Plateau forest-grassland mosaic (Nigeria)
- Maputaland-Pondoland bushland and thickets (Mozambique, South Africa, Eswatini)
- Southern Afrotemperate Forest (Western Cape Province of South Africa)
- Rwenzori-Virunga montane moorlands (Democratic Republic of the Congo, Rwanda, Uganda)
- South Malawi montane forest-grassland mosaic (Malawi, Mozambique)
- Southern Rift montane forest-grassland mosaic (Malawi, Tanzania)

Deserts and xeric shrublands

- Southwestern Arabian montane woodlands (Saudi Arabia, Yemen)
