= Ethiopian montane forests =

Tropical moist broadleaf forest ecoregion in Ethiopia

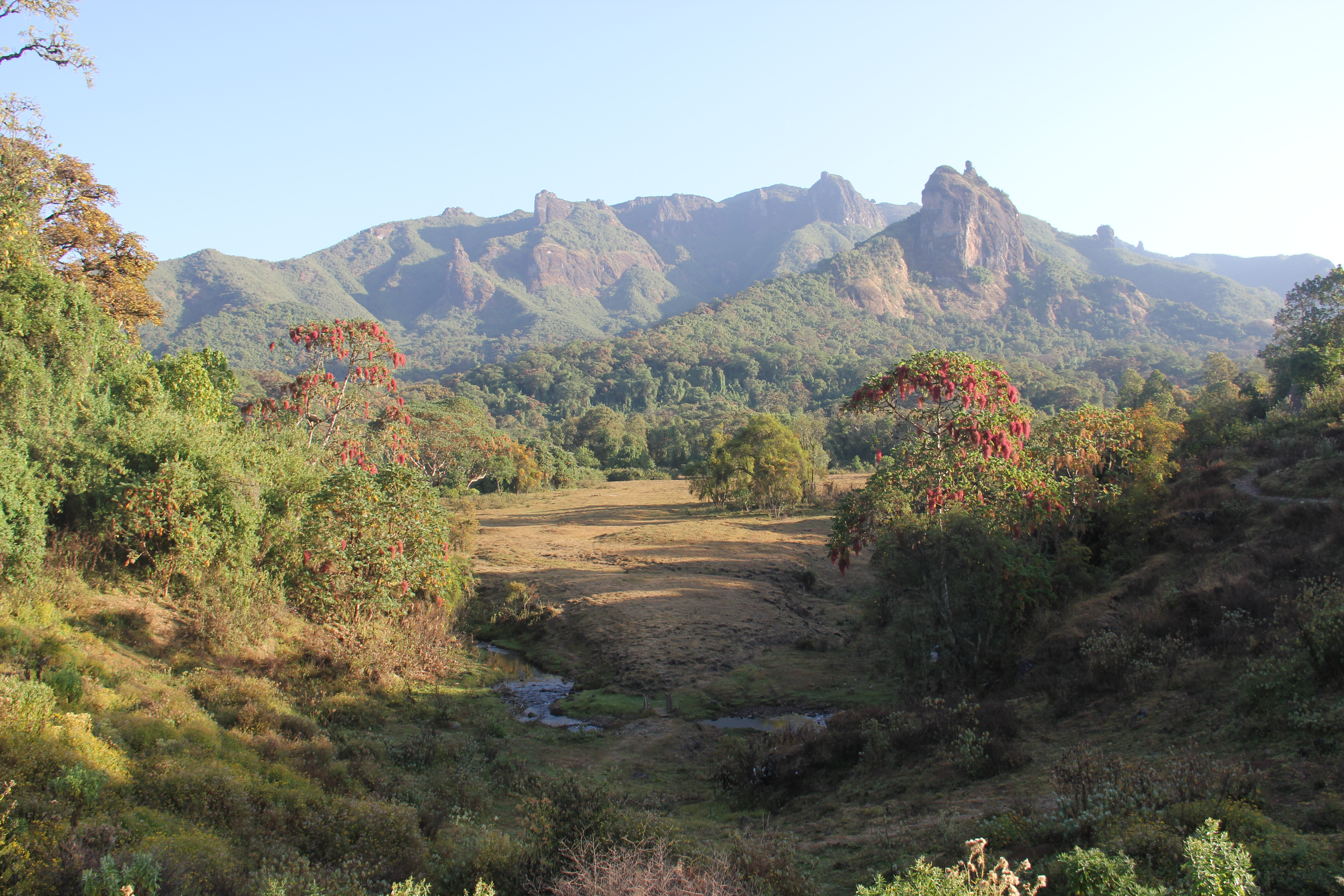
- Harenna Forest

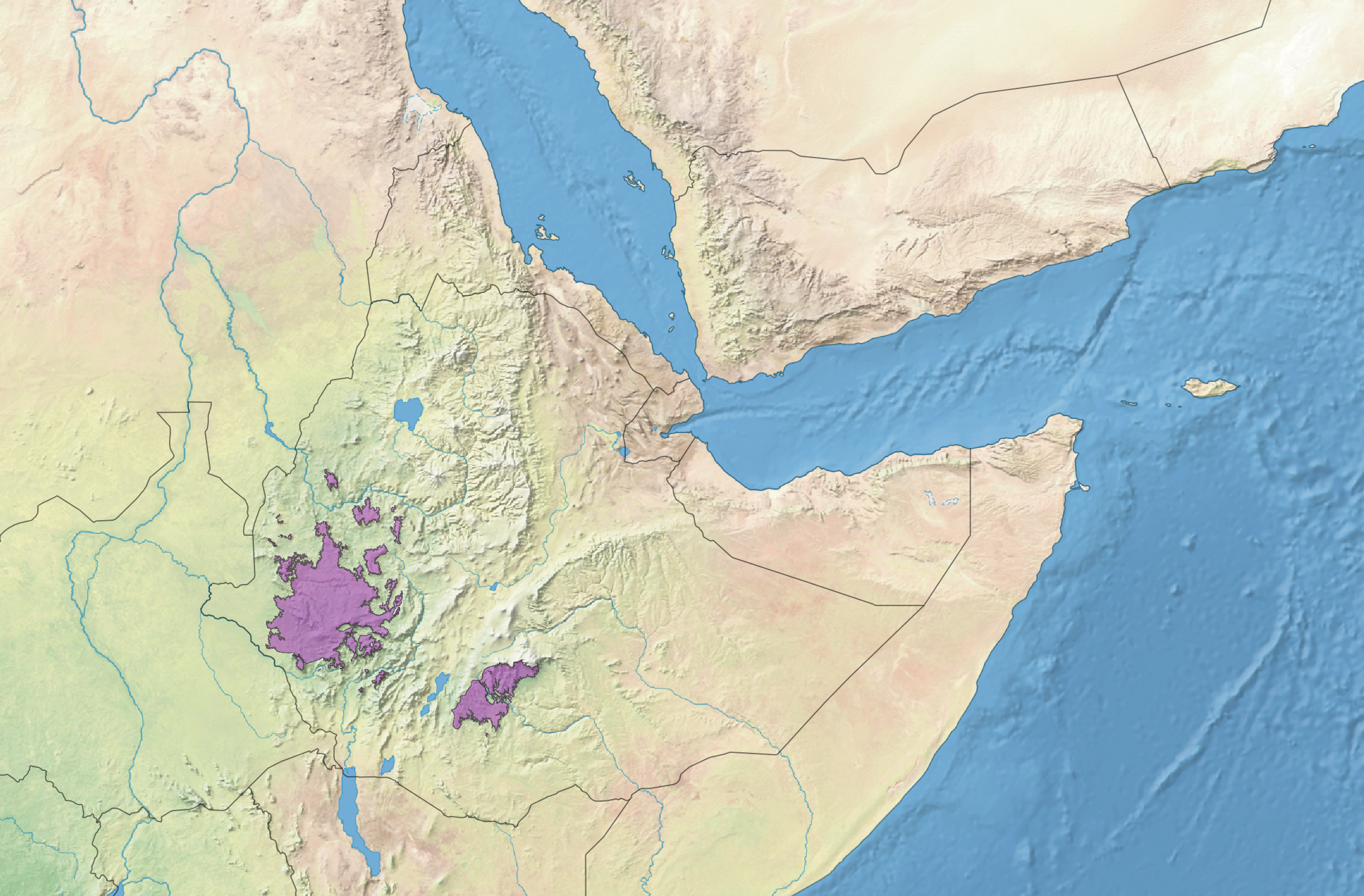
- Map of the Ethiopian Montane Forests Ecoregion

Ecology
- Realm: Afrotropical
- Biome: tropical and subtropical moist broadleaf forests
- Borders: List: East Sudanian savanna; Ethiopian montane grasslands and woodlands; Ethiopian montane moorlands; Sahelian Acacia savanna; Somali Acacia–Commiphora bushlands and thickets

Geography
- Area: 67,663 km^{2} (26,125 sq mi)
- Country: Ethiopia
- Elevation: 1000 – 3000 m

Conservation
- Conservation status: Critical/endangered (WWF, 2001), Nature Imperiled (One Earth, 2017)
- Protected: 7,659 km^{2} (11%)

The Ethiopian montane forests is a tropical moist broadleaf forest ecoregion in Ethiopia. It covers the southwestern and southeastern portions of the Ethiopian Highlands. The ecoregion includes distinctive Afromontane evergreen forests. The ecoregion's biodiversity is threatened by deforestation, conversion to agriculture, and overgrazing.

== Geography ==
The Ethiopian montane forests lie in the southwestern and southeastern Ethiopian Highlands. The southwestern portion is bounded at lower elevations by the East Sudanian savanna, and the southeastern portion transitions to the Somali Acacia–Commiphora bushlands and thickets at lower elevations.

At higher elevations they transition to the Ethiopian montane moorlands. The Ethiopian montane grasslands and woodlands ecoregion covers most of the rest of the highlands, and includes drier montane Afromontane forests, woodlands, and grasslands to the north and east.

=== Ecoregion delineation ===
In the 1983 Vegetation Map of Africa, Frank White identified three vegetation types in the Ethiopian highlands – "Evergreen and semi-evergreen bushland and thicket - East African" from 1000 to 1800 meters elevation, "Undifferentiated montane vegetation (A) Afromontane" from 1,800 to about 3800 meters elevation, and "Altimontane vegetation in tropical Africa" above 3,800 meters elevation. The 2001 Terrestrial Ecoregions of the World system adopted by the World Wildlife Fund followed White's vegetation types in the Ethiopian Highlands, with the "Ethiopian montane forests" ecoregion corresponding to White's "Evergreen and semi-evergreen bushland and thicket - East African", the "Ethiopian montane grasslands and woodlands" to the "Undifferentiated montane vegetation (A) Afromontane", and the Ethiopian montane moorlands to White's "Altimontane vegetation in tropical Africa".

In 2017 Eric Dinerstein et al. revised the ecoregion system in the highlands, following the map of potential natural vegetation of eastern Africa developed by VECEA. The revised ecoregion boundaries were adopted by One Earth, and later by the WWF.

== Climate ==
Moisture-bearing winds from the Red Sea provide rainfall throughout the year. The highlands generate orographic precipitation, and are generally cooler and more humid than the lower-elevation deserts and dry shrublands that bound the highlands on the east and south. Orographic effects create fog and cloud cover which keep humidity high and help sustain forests. Southwesterly winds bring rainfall from May to October. Average annual rainfall varies with location, from 600 to 1500 mm. The southern and southwestern portions of the ecoregion generally have higher rainfall.

== Flora ==
Potential vegetation map of Ethiopia. The Ethiopian montane forests ecoregion encompasses the moist evergreen rain forest (MAF) and transitional rain forest (TRF). Afroalpine belt (AB) Ericaceous belt (EB) Dry evergreen afromontane forest and grassland complex (DAF) Moist evergreen afromontane forest (MAF) Transitional rain forest (TRF) Combretum-Terminalia woodland and wooded grassland (CTW) Wooded grassland of the western Gambela region (WGG) Acacia-Commiphora woodland and bushland proper (ACB) Acacia wooded grassland of the Rift Valley (ACB/RV) Desert and semi-desert scrubland (DSS) Riverine vegetation (RV) Freshwater lakes - open water vegetation (FLV/OW) Freshwater marshes and swamps, floodplains and lake shore vegetation (FLV/MFS) Salt-water lakes - open water vegetation (SLV/OW) Salt pans, saline/brackish and intermittent wetlands and salt-lake shore vegetation (SLV/SSS) (Adapted from Ib Friis, Sebsebe Demissew and Paulo van Breugel (2010).)

The Ethiopian montane forests are composed of two main plant communities, Afromontane rain forest (aka moist evergreen Afromontane forest) and Afromontane transitional rain forest. The ecoregion's Afromontane flora includes species distinct to Africa's highland regions, often mixed with typical lowland species. In most of the ecoregion the natural vegetation has been heavily altered by livestock grazing, conversion to agriculture, and plantations of exotic trees.

Afromontane forests grow between (1500-) 1800 and 2600 (-3000) meters elevation. The largest block of Afromontane forest is in the southwestern highlands. There is a smaller bloc in the eastern highlands, which includes the Harenna Forest on the southern slope of the Bale Mountains. Characteristic trees of the Afromontane rain forests include Diospyros abyssinica, Mitragyna rubrostipulata, Macaranga capensis, Ochna holstii, Olea capensis, Aningeria adolfi-friederici, Prunus africana, and Syzygium guineense, along with the tree fern Alsophila manniana.

In the Harenna Forest, lower montane forests grow between 1900 and 2300 meters elevation. Middle montane forests occur between 2300 and 2800 meters. Upper montane forests, which include forests dominated by Hagenia abyssinica and extensive stands of the bamboo Yushania alpina, grow from 2800 to 3250 meters elevation. At lower elevations, the Harenna Forest transitions to a distinct woodland community, with an open canopy of Warburgia ugandensis, Croton macrostachyus, Syzygium guineense, and Afrocarpus gracilior, and wild coffee (Coffea arabica) as the dominant understory shrub.

Afromontane transitional rain forests grow on the western slopes of the southwestern highlands, as low as 450 meters elevation and up to 1,500 meters elevation. Transitional rain forests between 450 and 650 meters elevation are typically semi-deciduous, while forests at higher elevations are mostly evergreen. Typical species include bastard white stinkwood (Celtis gomphophylla), forest fever berry (Croton sylvaticus), giant diospyros (Diospyros abyssinica), forest sandpaper fig Ficus exasperata), Manilkara butugi, and mvule (Milicia excelsa).

Kolla is an open woodland found at lower elevations, in the transition to the lowland savannas and dry woodlands. Characteristic trees are species of Terminalia, Commiphora, Boswellia, and Acacia.

== Fauna ==
Native birds include Harwood's spurfowl (Pternistis harwoodi), Ruspoli's turaco (Menelikornis ruspolii), and yellow-throated seedeater (Crithagra flavigula), which are endemic to the Ethiopian Highlands.

== Conservation and protected areas ==
11% of the ecoregion is in protected areas. These include Bale Mountains National Park, Chebera Churchura National Park, Didessa National Park, Bonga Forest Reserve, and the proposed Gebre Dima, Harena-Kokosa, and Sele Anderacha National Forest Priority Areas.

Only 1% of the area outside protected areas is covered in relatively intact forest. One Earth assesses the ecoregion as 'imperiled', with "the amount of protected and unprotected natural habitat remaining is less than or equal to 20%. Achieving half protected is not possible in the short term and efforts should focus on conserving remaining, native habitat fragments.".
