= Ethiopian montane grasslands and woodlands =

Montane grasslands and shrublands ecoregion in Ethiopia

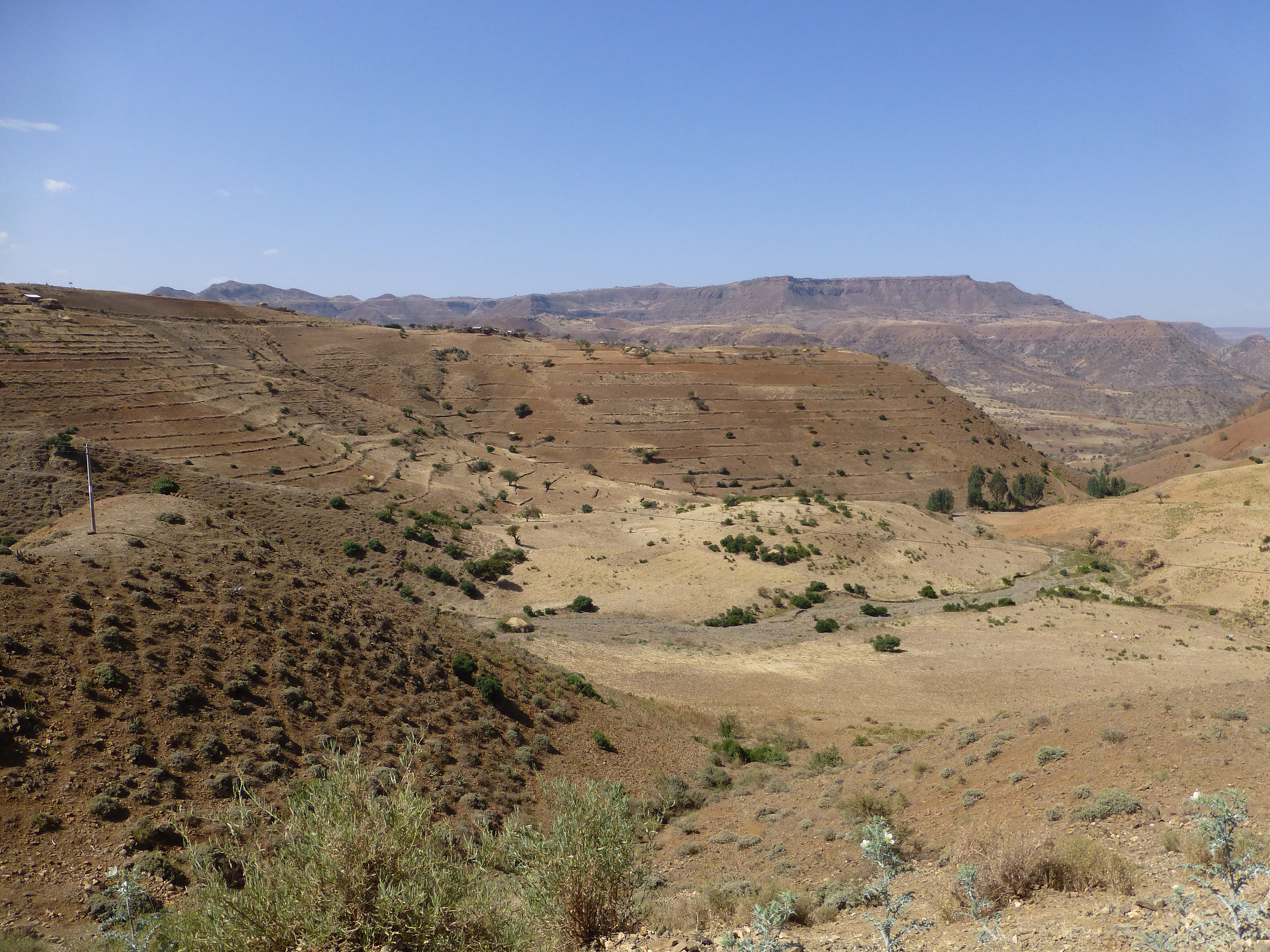
- Landscape near Sekota, Ethiopia

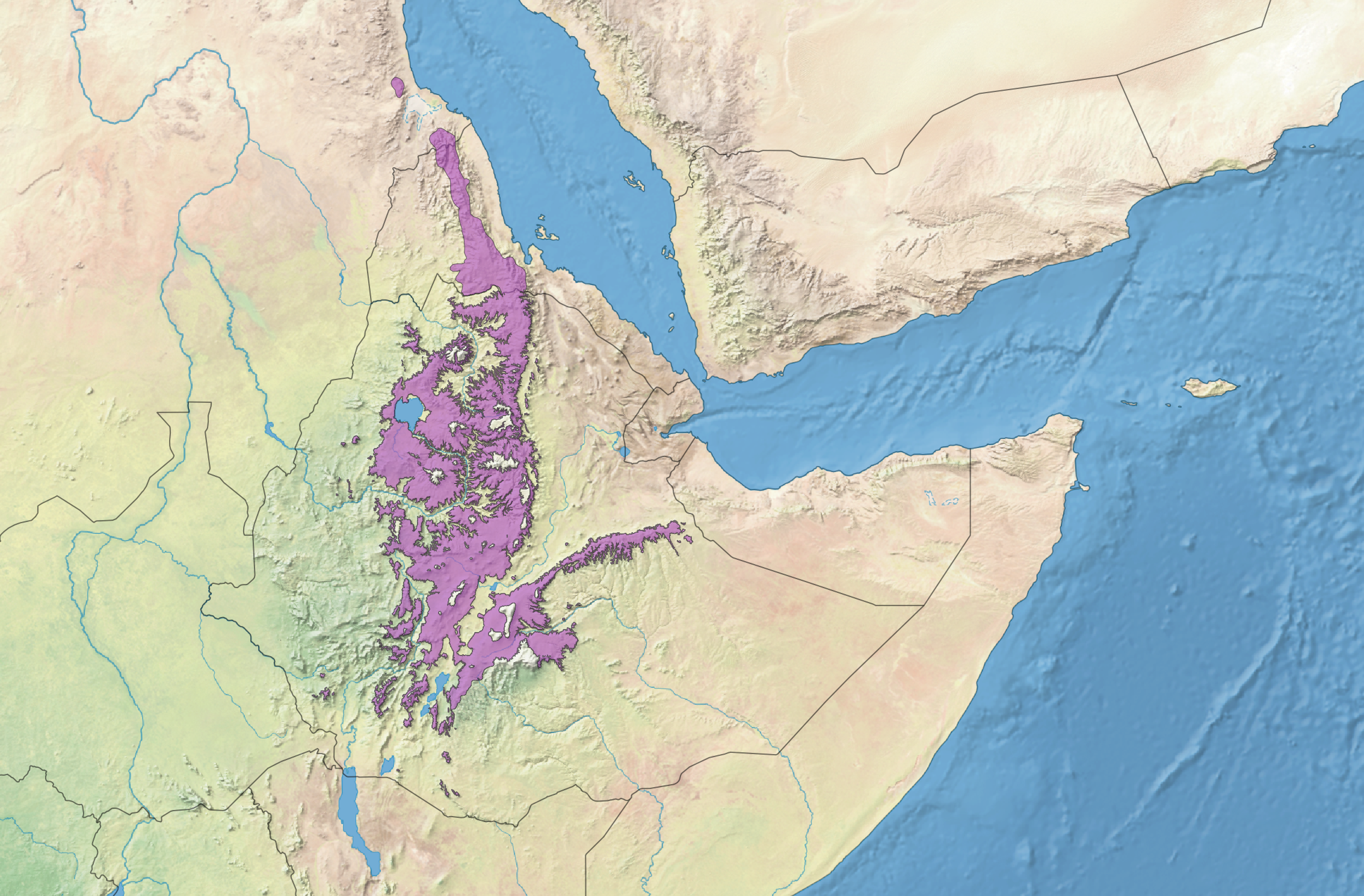
- Map of Ethiopian Montane Grasslands and Woodlands Ecoregion

Ecology
- Realm: Afrotropical
- Biome: montane grasslands and shrublands
- Borders: List: Djibouti xeric shrublands; East Sudanian savanna; Ethiopian montane forests; Ethiopian montane moorlands; Sahelian Acacia savanna; Somali Acacia–Commiphora bushlands and thickets

Geography
- Area: 245,895 km^{2} (94,941 sq mi)
- Countries: Ethiopia; Eritrea; Sudan
- Elevation: 1000 – 3000+ m

Conservation
- Conservation status: Critical/endangered
- Protected: 19,442 km^{2} (9%)

The Ethiopian montane grasslands and woodlands is a montane grasslands and shrublands ecoregion in Ethiopia. It occupies the middle elevations of the Ethiopian Highlands, between the high-elevation Ethiopian montane moorlands and lowland woodlands, savannas, shrublands, and thickets.

The ecoregion includes montane grasslands, open woodlands, shrublands, and pockets of forest.

== Geography ==
Potential vegetation map of Ethiopia. The Ethiopian montane grasslands and woodlands ecoregion encompasses the dry evergreen afromontane forest and grassland complex (DAF). Afroalpine belt (AB) Ericaceous belt (EB) Dry evergreen afromontane forest and grassland complex (DAF) Moist evergreen afromontane forest (MAF) Transitional rain forest (TRF) Combretum-Terminalia woodland and wooded grassland (CTW) Wooded grassland of the western Gambela region (WGG) Acacia-Commiphora woodland and bushland proper (ACB) Acacia wooded grassland of the Rift Valley (ACB/RV) Desert and semi-desert scrubland (DSS) Riverine vegetation (RV) Freshwater lakes - open water vegetation (FLV/OW) Freshwater marshes and swamps, floodplains and lake shore vegetation (FLV/MFS) Salt-water lakes - open water vegetation (SLV/OW) Salt pans, saline/brackish and intermittent wetlands and salt-lake shore vegetation (SLV/SSS) (Adapted from Ib Friis, Sebsebe Demissew and Paulo van Breugel (2010).)

The Ethiopian Highlands lie mostly in Ethiopia, extending into Eritrea and Sudan to the north. The Great Rift Valley bisects the highlands, separating it into eastern and western portions.

The ecoregion includes the middle elevations of the Ethiopian Highlands, between 1,000 and 3,000 meters elevation. It excludes the higher-rainfall southwestern and southeastern portions of the highlands, which constitute the separate Ethiopian montane forests ecoregion.

The ecoregion extends through central Eritrea to border with Sudan, and includes two northern outliers in the Red Sea Hills of eastern Sudan, Mount Erkowit, and Gabal Elba on the border of Egypt and Sudan.

=== Ecoregion delineation ===
In the 1983 Vegetation Map of Africa, Frank White identified three vegetation types in the Ethiopian highlands – "Evergreen and semi-evergreen bushland and thicket - East African" from 1000 to 1800 meters elevation, "Undifferentiated montane vegetation (A) Afromontane" from 1,800 to about 3800 meters elevation, and "Altimontane vegetation in tropical Africa" above 3,800 meters elevation. The 2001 Terrestrial Ecoregions of the World system adopted by the World Wildlife Fund followed White's vegetation types in the Ethiopian Highlands, with the "Ethiopian montane forests" ecoregion corresponding to White's "Evergreen and semi-evergreen bushland and thicket - East African", the "Ethiopian montane grasslands and woodlands" to the "Undifferentiated montane vegetation (A) Afromontane", and the Ethiopian montane moorlands to White's "Altimontane vegetation in tropical Africa".

In 2017 Eric Dinerstein et al. revised the ecoregion system in the highlands, following the map of potential natural vegetation of eastern Africa developed by VECEA. The ecoregion boundary corresponds to the dry evergreen afromontane forest and grassland complex which covers most of the highlands, except for the more humid forests of the southwestern and southeastern highlands. The revised ecoregion boundaries were adopted by One Earth, and later by the WWF.

== Flora ==
The natural vegetation includes grassland, open woodlands, shrubland including thorn scrub, and areas of forest.

Afromontane forests are found in more humid areas of the highlands, generally between 1,500 and 2,700 meters elevation with annual rainfall from 700 to 1100 mm. These forest patches are widely separated by areas of grassland, shrubland, and cultivation. The Anabe and Denkoro forests, in former Wollo Province at 2100–2200 meters elevation, are the northernmost forests in Ethiopia. Evergreen forests are found in the Simien Mountains. The conifers African juniper (Juniperus procera) and Afrocarpus falcatus are the predominant canopy trees, sometimes mixed and sometimes single-dominant, forming a canopy 20–30 meters tall. Broadleaved canopy trees include Olea europaea subsp. cuspidata, Croton macrostachyus, and Ficus spp. Small and mid-sized trees form a stratum below the canopy, and include Allophylus abyssinicus, Apodytes dimidiata, Bersama abyssinica, Cassipourea malosana, Celtis africana, Noronhia mildbraedii, Dovyalis abyssinica, Dracaena steudneri, Ekebergia capensis, Erythrina brucei (endemic), Millettia ferruginea (endemic), Lepidotrichilia volkensii, Maytenus undata, Olinia rochetiana, Prunus africana, Vepris nobilis, and Vepris dainellii (endemic). Smaller trees and shrubs include Carissa spinarum, Discopodium penninervium, Dombeya torrida, Halleria lucida, Acanthus sennii (endemic), Lobelia giberroa, Myrsine africana, Pittosporum viridiflorum, Ritchiea albersii, Solanecio gigas, and Spiniluma oxyacantha. Scrambling of species of Rubus, including Rubus steudneri, are common, as are lianas like Scepocarpus hypselodendron. Epiphytes include ferns, orchids, and species of Peperomia e.g. Peperomia abyssinica.

At higher elevations between 3,000 and 3,400 meters is a woodland or evergreen bushland with the trees Hagenia abyssinica and Hypericum revolutum along with smaller trees and shrubs including Erica arborea, Lasiosiphon glaucus, Chrysojasminum stans, Myrica salicifolia, Myrsine africana, Myrsine melanophloeos, Nuxia congesta, and Rosa abyssinica. These upper montane woodlands and bushlands are interspersed with thickets of bamboo (Oldeania alpina) and adjoin the ericaceous belt, the transition between the montane forests and the high-elevation subalpine moorlands.

Afromontane woodland, wooded grassland, and grassland includes both primary woodlands and secondary woodlands and wooded grasslands in disturbed areas. Acacias are the predominant trees in the primary woodlands, including Vachellia abyssinica, V. lahai, V. pilispina and V. origena, and the endemic species V. negrii, V. bavazzanoi, and Senegalia venosa. Both primary and secondary woodlands and wooded grasslands also include afromontane forest trees and shrubs. Bushland dominated by species of Maytenus and Rhus grows on slopes grazed by livestock.

Kolla is an open woodland found at lower elevations, in the transition to the lowland savannas and dry woodlands. Characteristic trees are species of Terminalia, Commiphora, Boswellia, and Acacia.

460 species, subspecies, and varieties of woody plants have been recorded in the ecoregion, of which 128 (28%) are endemic to the ecoregion.

Much of the highlands have been densely populated for centuries, and the vegetation has been much altered by fire, livestock grazing, conversion to agriculture, and overharvesting firewood and timber. Much of the original woodland and forest is now replaced with grassland and shrubland. In other areas plantations of exotic trees have replaced native plant communities. Ethiopian highland agriculture developed on the ecoregion's fertile basalt-derived black soils.

== Fauna ==
Several bird and mammal species are near-endemic, dwelling in both the montane grasslands and woodlands and the high-elevation Ethiopian montane moorlands. These include the mammals walia ibex (Capra walie), mountain nyala (Tragelaphus buxtoni), and gelada baboon (Theropithecus gelada). The Bale Mountains vervet (Chlorocebus djamdjamensis) is limited to the upper montane belt of the Harenna Forest and other nearby forests in the southern highlands. Its diet consists mostly of Oldeania alpina bamboo shoots.

Near-endemic birds include Rüppell's black chat (Myrmecocichla melaena) and Ankober serin (Crithagra ankoberensis), which also range into the montane moorlands, and the lineated pytilia (Pytilia lineata), The blue-winged goose (Cyanochen cyanoptera), Rouget's rail (Rougetius rougetii), Abyssinian catbird (Sylvia galinieri), and Harwood's francolin (Pternistis harwoodi) are endemic to the highlands of Ethiopia and Eritrea, and near-endemic to the ecoregion.

== Protected areas ==
About 9% of the ecoregion is in protected areas. Protected areas include Arsi Mountains, Bale Mountains, Borana, Chebera Churchura, Maze, and Simien Mountains national parks, and Eastern Hararghe and Mizan-Teferi controlled hunting areas, in Ethiopia, and Yob Wildlife Refuge in Eritrea.
