= East Sudanian savanna =

Tropical savanna ecoregion in Africa

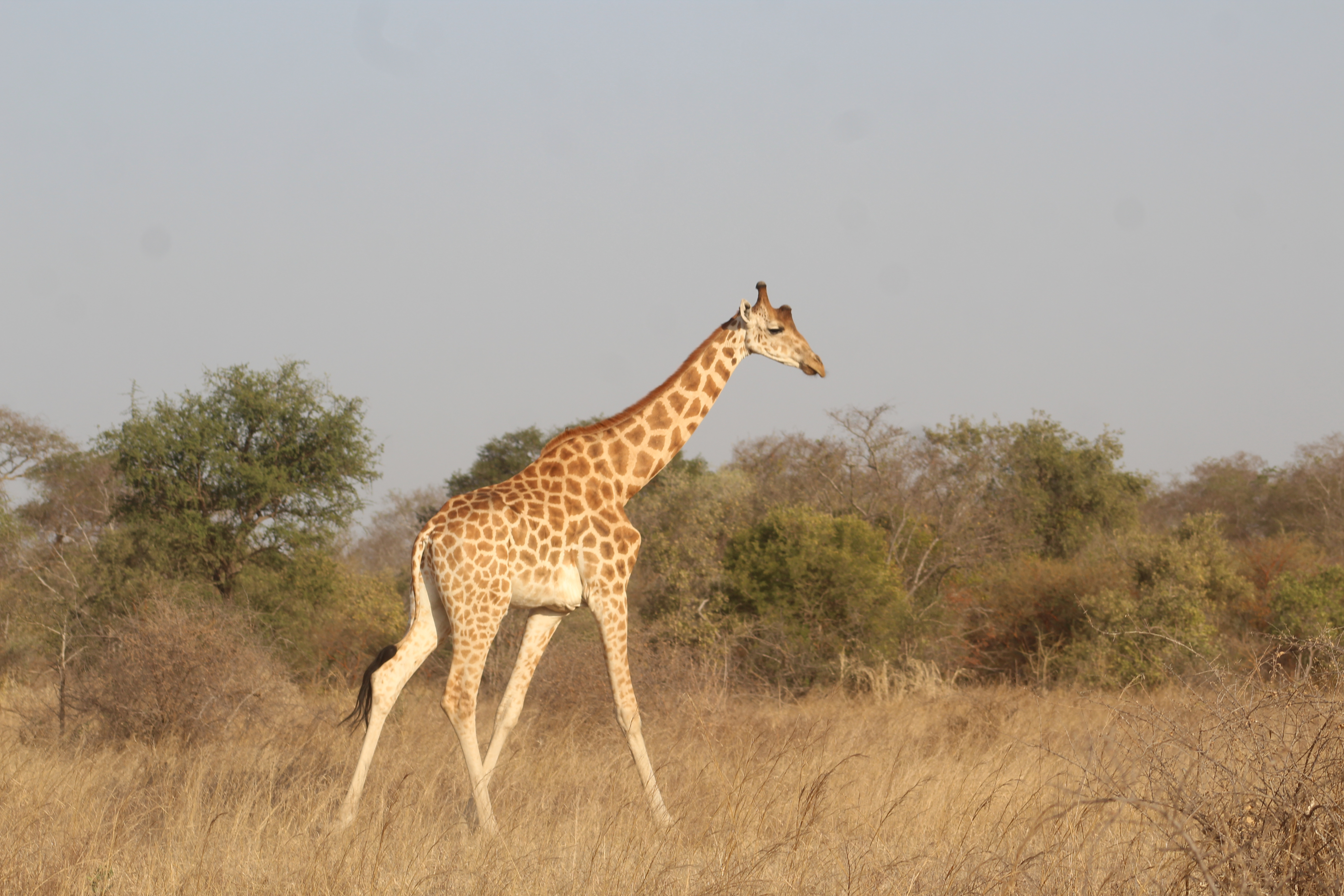
- Giraffe in Zakouma National Park, Chad

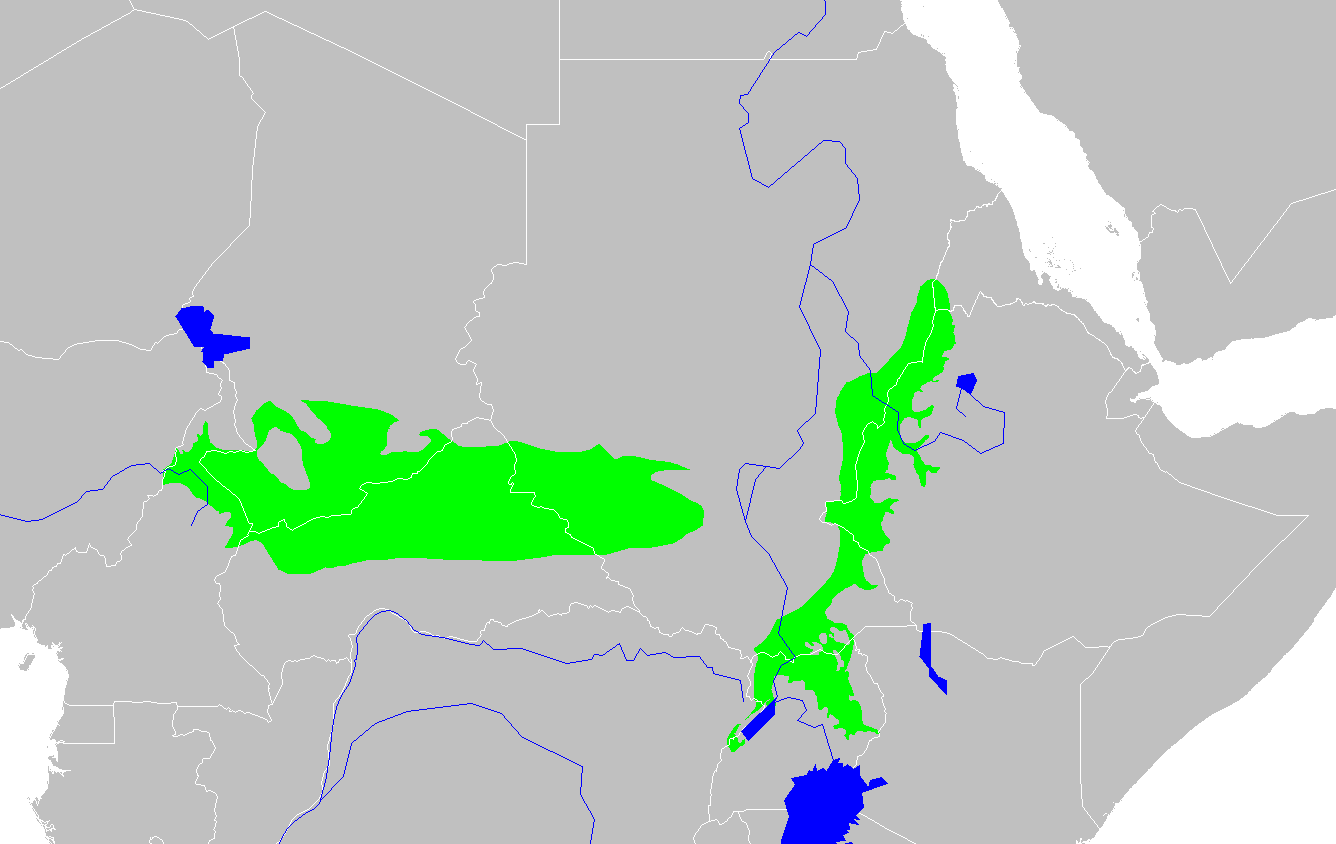
- Map of the East Sudanian savanna ecoregion

Ecology
- Realm: Afrotropical
- Biome: tropical and subtropical grasslands, savannas, and shrublands
- Borders: List: Ethiopian montane forests; Ethiopian montane grasslands and woodlands; Mandara Plateau mosaic; Northern Acacia–Commiphora bushlands and thickets; Northern Congolian forest–savanna mosaic; Sahelian Acacia savanna; Saharan flooded grasslands; Victoria Basin forest–savanna mosaic; West Sudanian savanna

Geography
- Area: 917,630 km^{2} (354,300 sq mi)
- Countries: List: Cameroon; Central African Republic; Chad; Democratic Republic of the Congo; Eritrea; Ethiopia; Kenya; South Sudan; Sudan; Uganda

Conservation
- Conservation status: Critical/endangered
- Protected: 24.68%

The East Sudanian savanna is a hot, seasonally dry tropical savanna ecoregion of Central and East Africa.

== Geography ==
The East Sudanian savanna is the eastern half of the Sudanian savanna belt which runs east and west across Africa. The eastern lies east of the Cameroon Highlands, and west of the Ethiopian Highlands. The Sahel belt of drier acacia savanna lies to the north, and beyond that is the Sahara Desert. More humid forest–savanna mosaic ecoregions lie to the south.

The Sudd flooded grasslands in South Sudan divide the ecoregion into eastern and western blocks. The land is mainly flat, although there are some hillier sections around Lake Albert and in western Ethiopia.

- the western block covers portions of northern Cameroon, southernmost Chad, northern Central African Republic, and southeastern South Sudan. It is bounded on the south by the Northern Congolian forest–savanna mosaic ecoregion.
- the eastern block lies in a belt stretching from northern Uganda along the Ethiopia–Sudan border region, bounded on the east by the western lowlands of Ethiopia, on the southeast by the Northern Acacia–Commiphora bushlands and thickets ecoregion, on the south by the Victoria Basin forest–savanna mosaic in Uganda, and on the southwest by the Northern Congolian forest-savanna mosaic.

== Climate ==
The climate is a tropical savanna climate and a hot semi-arid climate (Köppen climate classification Aw and BSh) with a dry season and a wet season and the temperature being warm and hot year-round.

=== Examples ===
Climate data for Garoua, Cameroon
| Month | Jan | Feb | Mar | Apr | May | Jun | Jul | Aug | Sep | Oct | Nov | Dec | Year |
|---|---|---|---|---|---|---|---|---|---|---|---|---|---|
| Mean daily maximum °C (°F) | 34.4 (93.9) | 37.3 (99.1) | 39.8 (103.6) | 39.5 (103.1) | 36.5 (97.7) | 33.2 (91.8) | 31.1 (88.0) | 30.7 (87.3) | 31.5 (88.7) | 34.2 (93.6) | 36.0 (96.8) | 34.8 (94.6) | 34.9 (94.8) |
| Daily mean °C (°F) | 26.0 (78.8) | 28.9 (84.0) | 32.2 (90.0) | 33.0 (91.4) | 30.7 (87.3) | 28.2 (82.8) | 26.6 (79.9) | 26.4 (79.5) | 26.7 (80.1) | 28.1 (82.6) | 27.3 (81.1) | 26.0 (78.8) | 28.3 (82.9) |
| Mean daily minimum °C (°F) | 17.5 (63.5) | 20.5 (68.9) | 24.7 (76.5) | 26.4 (79.5) | 24.9 (76.8) | 23.2 (73.8) | 22.2 (72.0) | 22.0 (71.6) | 21.9 (71.4) | 22.2 (72.0) | 19.2 (66.6) | 17.3 (63.1) | 21.8 (71.2) |
| Average rainfall mm (inches) | 0.0 (0.0) | 0.0 (0.0) | 2.0 (0.08) | 44.1 (1.74) | 108.4 (4.27) | 134.8 (5.31) | 205.3 (8.08) | 247.9 (9.76) | 190.0 (7.48) | 63.3 (2.49) | 1.6 (0.06) | 0.0 (0.0) | 997.4 (39.27) |
| Average rainy days (≥ 1.0 mm) | 0 | 0 | 1 | 5 | 9 | 11 | 14 | 17 | 24 | 6 | 1 | 0 | 88 |
| Mean monthly sunshine hours | 275.0 | 252.6 | 260.1 | 245.4 | 256.7 | 224.4 | 194.0 | 187.2 | 204.5 | 261.5 | 279.2 | 286.5 | 2,927.1 |
Source: NOAA

Climate data for Sarh, Chad (1961-1990)
| Month | Jan | Feb | Mar | Apr | May | Jun | Jul | Aug | Sep | Oct | Nov | Dec | Year |
|---|---|---|---|---|---|---|---|---|---|---|---|---|---|
| Mean daily maximum °C (°F) | 35.8 (96.4) | 38.0 (100.4) | 39.1 (102.4) | 38.5 (101.3) | 36.2 (97.2) | 33.2 (91.8) | 30.9 (87.6) | 30.6 (87.1) | 31.7 (89.1) | 33.6 (92.5) | 35.5 (95.9) | 35.4 (95.7) | 34.9 (94.8) |
| Mean daily minimum °C (°F) | 16.5 (61.7) | 18.8 (65.8) | 22.6 (72.7) | 24.7 (76.5) | 24.1 (75.4) | 22.6 (72.7) | 21.6 (70.9) | 21.5 (70.7) | 21.5 (70.7) | 21.7 (71.1) | 18.8 (65.8) | 16.4 (61.5) | 20.9 (69.6) |
| Average rainfall mm (inches) | 0.1 (0.00) | 1.6 (0.06) | 9.5 (0.37) | 37.4 (1.47) | 82.1 (3.23) | 135.9 (5.35) | 234.4 (9.23) | 243.7 (9.59) | 165.5 (6.52) | 55.8 (2.20) | 3.3 (0.13) | 0.0 (0.0) | 969.3 (38.16) |
| Average rainy days (≥ 0.1 mm) | 0 | 1 | 2 | 5 | 9 | 12 | 15 | 18 | 16 | 7 | 1 | 0 | 86 |
| Average relative humidity (%) | 33 | 29 | 37 | 50 | 61 | 72 | 79 | 82 | 80 | 73 | 57 | 42 | 58 |
| Mean monthly sunshine hours | 266.6 | 243.6 | 244.9 | 237.0 | 241.8 | 207.0 | 173.6 | 176.7 | 186.0 | 232.5 | 261.0 | 266.6 | 2,737.3 |
| Mean daily sunshine hours | 8.6 | 8.7 | 7.9 | 7.9 | 7.8 | 6.9 | 5.6 | 5.7 | 6.2 | 7.5 | 8.7 | 8.6 | 7.5 |
Source 1: World Meteorological Organization (temperatures and rainy days)
Source 2: NOAA (sun, humidity and precipitation)

Climate data for Moundou, Chad (1961-1990)
| Month | Jan | Feb | Mar | Apr | May | Jun | Jul | Aug | Sep | Oct | Nov | Dec | Year |
|---|---|---|---|---|---|---|---|---|---|---|---|---|---|
| Mean daily maximum °C (°F) | 34.1 (93.4) | 36.7 (98.1) | 38.6 (101.5) | 38.0 (100.4) | 35.7 (96.3) | 32.3 (90.1) | 30.2 (86.4) | 29.8 (85.6) | 30.7 (87.3) | 33.1 (91.6) | 35.1 (95.2) | 34.2 (93.6) | 34.0 (93.2) |
| Mean daily minimum °C (°F) | 15.1 (59.2) | 18.3 (64.9) | 22.5 (72.5) | 24.2 (75.6) | 23.5 (74.3) | 22.1 (71.8) | 21.2 (70.2) | 21.0 (69.8) | 20.8 (69.4) | 21.0 (69.8) | 17.4 (63.3) | 14.6 (58.3) | 20.1 (68.2) |
| Average rainfall mm (inches) | 0.0 (0.0) | 0.2 (0.01) | 4.6 (0.18) | 39.2 (1.54) | 89.8 (3.54) | 147.7 (5.81) | 257.8 (10.15) | 284.8 (11.21) | 200.1 (7.88) | 57.1 (2.25) | 1.5 (0.06) | 0.0 (0.0) | 1,082.8 (42.63) |
| Average rainy days (≥ 0.1 mm) | 0 | 1 | 2 | 5 | 9 | 12 | 15 | 19 | 13 | 7 | 2 | 0 | 85 |
| Average relative humidity (%) | 36 | 28 | 31 | 50 | 63 | 73 | 80 | 81 | 78 | 73 | 56 | 45 | 58 |
| Mean monthly sunshine hours | 279.0 | 249.2 | 248.0 | 234.0 | 241.8 | 210.0 | 182.9 | 170.5 | 186.0 | 235.6 | 282.0 | 291.4 | 2,810.4 |
| Mean daily sunshine hours | 9.0 | 8.9 | 8.0 | 7.8 | 7.8 | 7.0 | 5.9 | 5.5 | 6.2 | 7.6 | 9.4 | 9.4 | 7.7 |
Source 1: World Meteorological Organization
Source 2: NOAA (sun and humidity)

Climate data for Birao, Central African Republic
| Month | Jan | Feb | Mar | Apr | May | Jun | Jul | Aug | Sep | Oct | Nov | Dec | Year |
|---|---|---|---|---|---|---|---|---|---|---|---|---|---|
| Mean daily maximum °C (°F) | 34.7 (94.5) | 37.3 (99.1) | 39.4 (102.9) | 39.7 (103.5) | 37.9 (100.2) | 35 (95) | 31.4 (88.5) | 30.8 (87.4) | 32.1 (89.8) | 34.5 (94.1) | 35 (95) | 33.6 (92.5) | 35.1 (95.2) |
| Daily mean °C (°F) | 23.7 (74.7) | 26 (79) | 28.8 (83.8) | 30.4 (86.7) | 30.2 (86.4) | 28.3 (82.9) | 25.7 (78.3) | 25.3 (77.5) | 25.9 (78.6) | 26.5 (79.7) | 23.9 (75.0) | 22.5 (72.5) | 26.4 (79.6) |
| Mean daily minimum °C (°F) | 12.7 (54.9) | 14.8 (58.6) | 18.3 (64.9) | 21.1 (70.0) | 22.5 (72.5) | 21.6 (70.9) | 20.1 (68.2) | 19.8 (67.6) | 19.7 (67.5) | 18.6 (65.5) | 12.8 (55.0) | 11.4 (52.5) | 17.8 (64.0) |
| Average rainfall mm (inches) | 0 (0) | 0 (0) | 1 (0.0) | 20 (0.8) | 67 (2.6) | 107 (4.2) | 189 (7.4) | 193 (7.6) | 146 (5.7) | 38 (1.5) | 1 (0.0) | 0 (0) | 762 (29.8) |
Source: Climate-Data.org

Climate data for Wau, South Sudan
| Month | Jan | Feb | Mar | Apr | May | Jun | Jul | Aug | Sep | Oct | Nov | Dec | Year |
|---|---|---|---|---|---|---|---|---|---|---|---|---|---|
| Record high °C (°F) | 41.1 (106.0) | 42.2 (108.0) | 43.5 (110.3) | 42.0 (107.6) | 41.5 (106.7) | 38.5 (101.3) | 36.5 (97.7) | 36.7 (98.1) | 40.0 (104.0) | 39.2 (102.6) | 38.5 (101.3) | 39.5 (103.1) | 43.5 (110.3) |
| Mean daily maximum °C (°F) | 35.5 (95.9) | 37.1 (98.8) | 38.1 (100.6) | 37.4 (99.3) | 35.3 (95.5) | 32.9 (91.2) | 31.4 (88.5) | 31.4 (88.5) | 32.6 (90.7) | 33.8 (92.8) | 35.2 (95.4) | 35.2 (95.4) | 34.7 (94.5) |
| Daily mean °C (°F) | 26.8 (80.2) | 28.5 (83.3) | 30.4 (86.7) | 30.6 (87.1) | 29.3 (84.7) | 27.5 (81.5) | 26.3 (79.3) | 26.2 (79.2) | 26.8 (80.2) | 27.4 (81.3) | 27.4 (81.3) | 26.5 (79.7) | 27.8 (82.0) |
| Mean daily minimum °C (°F) | 19.1 (66.4) | 19.9 (67.8) | 22.7 (72.9) | 23.8 (74.8) | 23.2 (73.8) | 22.0 (71.6) | 21.2 (70.2) | 21.0 (69.8) | 21.0 (69.8) | 21.0 (69.8) | 19.6 (67.3) | 17.9 (64.2) | 20.9 (69.6) |
| Record low °C (°F) | 9.3 (48.7) | 12.5 (54.5) | 14.9 (58.8) | 16.5 (61.7) | 19.5 (67.1) | 17.7 (63.9) | 18.0 (64.4) | 18.6 (65.5) | 17.0 (62.6) | 16.4 (61.5) | 11.4 (52.5) | 10.3 (50.5) | 9.3 (48.7) |
| Average precipitation mm (inches) | 1.3 (0.05) | 3.6 (0.14) | 18.6 (0.73) | 68.3 (2.69) | 118.8 (4.68) | 177.4 (6.98) | 176.0 (6.93) | 192.3 (7.57) | 179.4 (7.06) | 123.8 (4.87) | 14.9 (0.59) | 0.1 (0.00) | 1,074.5 (42.30) |
| Average precipitation days (≥ 0.1 mm) | 0.2 | 0.3 | 3.4 | 6.3 | 11.4 | 12.7 | 15.9 | 15.5 | 23.7 | 11.2 | 1.7 | 0.1 | 102.4 |
| Average relative humidity (%) | 29 | 26 | 35 | 48 | 62 | 71 | 76 | 77 | 74 | 69 | 48 | 35 | 54 |
| Mean monthly sunshine hours | 288.3 | 246.4 | 229.4 | 228.0 | 220.1 | 204.0 | 182.9 | 192.2 | 204.0 | 223.2 | 264.0 | 294.5 | 2,777 |
| Mean daily sunshine hours | 9.3 | 8.8 | 7.4 | 7.6 | 7.1 | 6.8 | 5.9 | 6.2 | 6.8 | 7.2 | 8.8 | 9.5 | 7.6 |
| Percentage possible sunshine | 79 | 74 | 62 | 61 | 60 | 54 | 47 | 50 | 56 | 60 | 75 | 82 | 63 |
Source: NOAA

Climate data for Juba, South Sudan (1971–2000, extremes 1931–1990)
| Month | Jan | Feb | Mar | Apr | May | Jun | Jul | Aug | Sep | Oct | Nov | Dec | Year |
|---|---|---|---|---|---|---|---|---|---|---|---|---|---|
| Record high °C (°F) | 42.2 (108.0) | 43.0 (109.4) | 43.6 (110.5) | 42.4 (108.3) | 43.7 (110.7) | 38.5 (101.3) | 37.0 (98.6) | 38.5 (101.3) | 39.0 (102.2) | 39.6 (103.3) | 40.4 (104.7) | 42.8 (109.0) | 43.7 (110.7) |
| Mean daily maximum °C (°F) | 36.8 (98.2) | 37.9 (100.2) | 37.7 (99.9) | 35.4 (95.7) | 33.5 (92.3) | 32.4 (90.3) | 31.1 (88.0) | 31.6 (88.9) | 33.1 (91.6) | 34.0 (93.2) | 34.7 (94.5) | 35.9 (96.6) | 34.5 (94.1) |
| Daily mean °C (°F) | 28.2 (82.8) | 29.3 (84.7) | 29.9 (85.8) | 28.7 (83.7) | 27.6 (81.7) | 26.5 (79.7) | 25.6 (78.1) | 25.5 (77.9) | 26.4 (79.5) | 26.9 (80.4) | 27.4 (81.3) | 27.5 (81.5) | 27.5 (81.4) |
| Mean daily minimum °C (°F) | 20.1 (68.2) | 21.7 (71.1) | 23.6 (74.5) | 23.4 (74.1) | 22.6 (72.7) | 21.9 (71.4) | 21.1 (70.0) | 21.0 (69.8) | 21.1 (70.0) | 21.3 (70.3) | 20.9 (69.6) | 20.0 (68.0) | 21.6 (70.9) |
| Record low °C (°F) | 11.4 (52.5) | 12.2 (54.0) | 16.3 (61.3) | 16.5 (61.7) | 16.8 (62.2) | 14.0 (57.2) | 13.3 (55.9) | 16.0 (60.8) | 15.5 (59.9) | 14.0 (57.2) | 13.2 (55.8) | 13.9 (57.0) | 11.4 (52.5) |
| Average rainfall mm (inches) | 5.1 (0.20) | 11.0 (0.43) | 36.7 (1.44) | 111.5 (4.39) | 129.9 (5.11) | 117.8 (4.64) | 144.7 (5.70) | 127.5 (5.02) | 103.7 (4.08) | 114.5 (4.51) | 43.1 (1.70) | 8.2 (0.32) | 953.7 (37.55) |
| Average rainy days (≥ 0.1 mm) | 1.4 | 2.0 | 6.6 | 11.6 | 12.4 | 10.3 | 13.0 | 11.5 | 8.6 | 10.4 | 6.5 | 1.9 | 96.2 |
| Average relative humidity (%) | 44 | 42 | 51 | 64 | 73 | 76 | 81 | 80 | 77 | 73 | 69 | 53 | 65 |
| Mean monthly sunshine hours | 279.0 | 235.2 | 210.8 | 198.0 | 207.7 | 207.0 | 182.9 | 204.6 | 228.0 | 241.8 | 237.0 | 260.4 | 2,692.4 |
| Percentage possible sunshine | 76 | 67 | 57 | 54 | 62 | 58 | 50 | 57 | 63 | 64 | 68 | 68 | 62 |
Source 1: World Meteorological Organization,
Source 2: NOAA (sun and humidity, 1961–1990), Deutscher Wetterdienst (extremes, mean temperatures)

Climate data for Ad-Damazin, Sudan (1961-1990)
| Month | Jan | Feb | Mar | Apr | May | Jun | Jul | Aug | Sep | Oct | Nov | Dec | Year |
|---|---|---|---|---|---|---|---|---|---|---|---|---|---|
| Record high °C (°F) | 41.1 (106.0) | 44.3 (111.7) | 44.5 (112.1) | 45.5 (113.9) | 47.0 (116.6) | 42.0 (107.6) | 39.0 (102.2) | 37.0 (98.6) | 38.1 (100.6) | 40.0 (104.0) | 41.0 (105.8) | 41.5 (106.7) | 47.0 (116.6) |
| Mean daily maximum °C (°F) | 35.2 (95.4) | 37.1 (98.8) | 39.5 (103.1) | 40.5 (104.9) | 38.5 (101.3) | 35.2 (95.4) | 31.8 (89.2) | 31.1 (88.0) | 32.5 (90.5) | 35.2 (95.4) | 36.9 (98.4) | 35.7 (96.3) | 35.8 (96.4) |
| Daily mean °C (°F) | 26.0 (78.8) | 27.7 (81.9) | 30.7 (87.3) | 32.2 (90.0) | 31.7 (89.1) | 29.1 (84.4) | 26.7 (80.1) | 26.1 (79.0) | 26.7 (80.1) | 28.2 (82.8) | 27.9 (82.2) | 26.3 (79.3) | 28.3 (82.9) |
| Mean daily minimum °C (°F) | 16.8 (62.2) | 18.4 (65.1) | 21.9 (71.4) | 23.9 (75.0) | 24.8 (76.6) | 22.9 (73.2) | 21.5 (70.7) | 21.2 (70.2) | 21.0 (69.8) | 21.2 (70.2) | 19.0 (66.2) | 17.0 (62.6) | 20.8 (69.4) |
| Record low °C (°F) | 8.5 (47.3) | 10.4 (50.7) | 13.4 (56.1) | 16.3 (61.3) | 18.0 (64.4) | 17.5 (63.5) | 15.9 (60.6) | 17.5 (63.5) | 17.5 (63.5) | 14.3 (57.7) | 12.0 (53.6) | 8.7 (47.7) | 8.5 (47.3) |
| Average rainfall mm (inches) | 0.0 (0.0) | 0.1 (0.00) | 2.8 (0.11) | 12.9 (0.51) | 40.2 (1.58) | 114.4 (4.50) | 189.2 (7.45) | 171.8 (6.76) | 133.6 (5.26) | 45.7 (1.80) | 2.1 (0.08) | 0.1 (0.00) | 712.9 (28.05) |
| Average rainy days (≥ 0.1 mm) | 0.0 | 0.1 | 0.3 | 1.4 | 6.0 | 12.3 | 16.1 | 16.9 | 12.4 | 4.7 | 0.5 | 0.0 | 70.7 |
| Average relative humidity (%) | 29 | 23 | 21 | 24 | 43 | 59 | 72 | 79 | 76 | 67 | 38 | 32 | 46.9 |
| Mean monthly sunshine hours | 303.8 | 280.0 | 294.5 | 288.0 | 257.3 | 201.0 | 170.5 | 182.9 | 204.0 | 251.1 | 279.0 | 294.5 | 3,006.6 |
| Percentage possible sunshine | 85 | 85 | 79 | 78 | 66 | 53 | 44 | 45 | 56 | 68 | 83 | 83 | 69 |
Source: NOAA

== Flora ==
Typical species are deciduous Terminalia trees with an undergrowth of shrubs and grasses such as Combretum and tall elephant grass (Pennisetum purpureum). There are more than 1,000 endemic plant species.

== Fauna ==
Threatened species include the African bush elephant (Loxodonta africana) (in Chad and the CAR), East African wild dog (Lycaon pictus lupinus), Northeast African cheetah (Acinonyx jubatus soemmeringii), African leopard (Panthera pardus paruds), lion (Panthera leo), and giant eland (Taurotragus derbianus).

== Urban areas and settlements ==
In Cameroon the region is more or less contiguous with the North Region, where Bénoué National Park and Bouba Njida National Park contain some of the endangered species mentioned above. In Chad East Sudanian savanna covers the south including the industrial city of Moundou, Chad's second largest city, the oil town of Doba and the cotton-growing towns of Sarh and Pala. In the Central African Republic the region covers the sparsely populated north of the country, the larger towns include Bossangoa. In Sudan west of the Sudd swamp east Sudanian savanna covers the Bahr el Ghazal area including the town of Wau. East of the Sudd the ecoregion runs north to south from northern Uganda, through south-eastern Sudan east of the White Nile (including the area around the southern cities of Juba and Eastern Equatoria around Torit), and up along the Ethiopia–Sudan border. Much of this area has seen combat in recent decades and is in various states of reconstruction.

== Threats and preservation ==
Seasonal cultivation and herding are lifestyles which lead the population of the savanna to overgraze, overharvest the trees for firewood or charcoal and cause fires. This has reduced the woodland considerably. However large areas of unspoilt habitat remain even outside protected areas, especially compared with the more heavily populated West Sudanian savanna.

Poaching is another problem, indeed the black rhinoceros (Diceros bicornis) and northern white rhinoceros (Ceratotherium simum cottoni) were formerly native to the ecoregion but have been eliminated through over-hunting.

== Protected areas ==
24.68% of the ecoregion is in protected areas. Protected areas include Bouba Njida National Park in Cameroon, Bamingui-Bangoran National Park and Biosphere Reserve, Andre Felix National Park, and Manovo-Gounda St. Floris National Park in the Central African Republic, Zakouma National Park in Chad, Gambella National Park in Ethiopia, Dinder National Park and Radom National Park in Sudan, Boma National Park and Kidepo Game Reserve in South Sudan, and Kidepo Valley National Park in Uganda.

Most protected areas are severely under-resourced, and apart from hunting for sport in the Central African Republic there is little wildlife-based tourism.

== See also ==
- Sudan (region)
