= Carex cognata =

Scientific classification
- Kingdom: Plantae
- Clade: Tracheophytes
- Clade: Angiosperms
- Clade: Monocots
- Clade: Commelinids
- Order: Poales
- Family: Cyperaceae
- Genus: Carex
- Species: C. cognata

Binomial name
- Carex cognata Kunth

Synonyms
- Carex acutatiformis H.E.Hess; Carex cognata var. drakensbergensis (C.B.Clarke) Kük.; Carex drakensbergensis C.B.Clarke; Carex retrorsa Nees

Species of flowering plant

Carex cognata is a species of sedge (family Cyperaceae), with an Afromontane distribution. A wetland obligate, it is typically, but not always, found at high altitudes.
