= Ethiopian montane moorlands =

Terrestrial ecoregion in Ethiopia

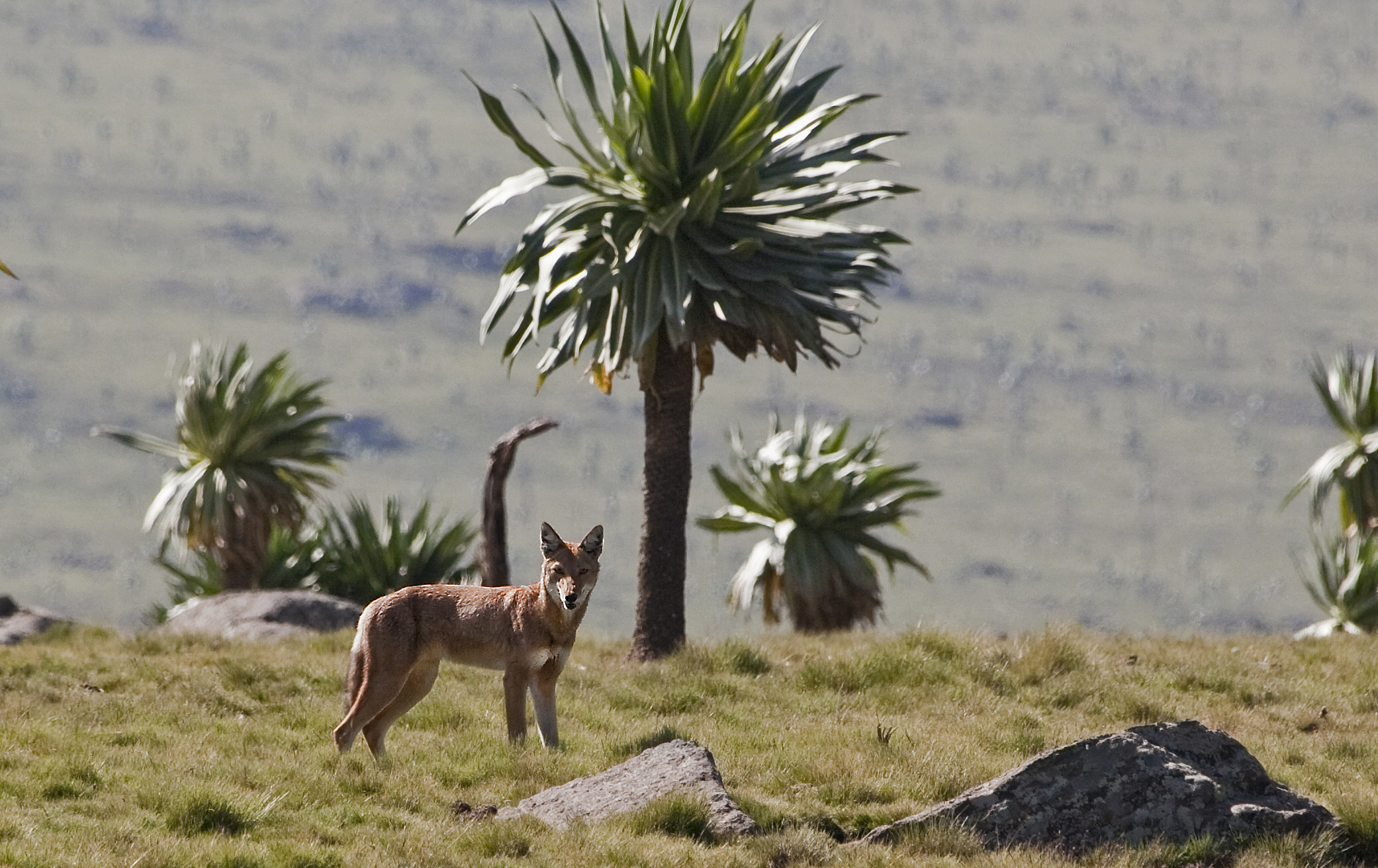
- Ethiopian wolf (Canis simienis) and giant lobelia plants (Lobelia rhynchopetalum) in the Simien Mountains.

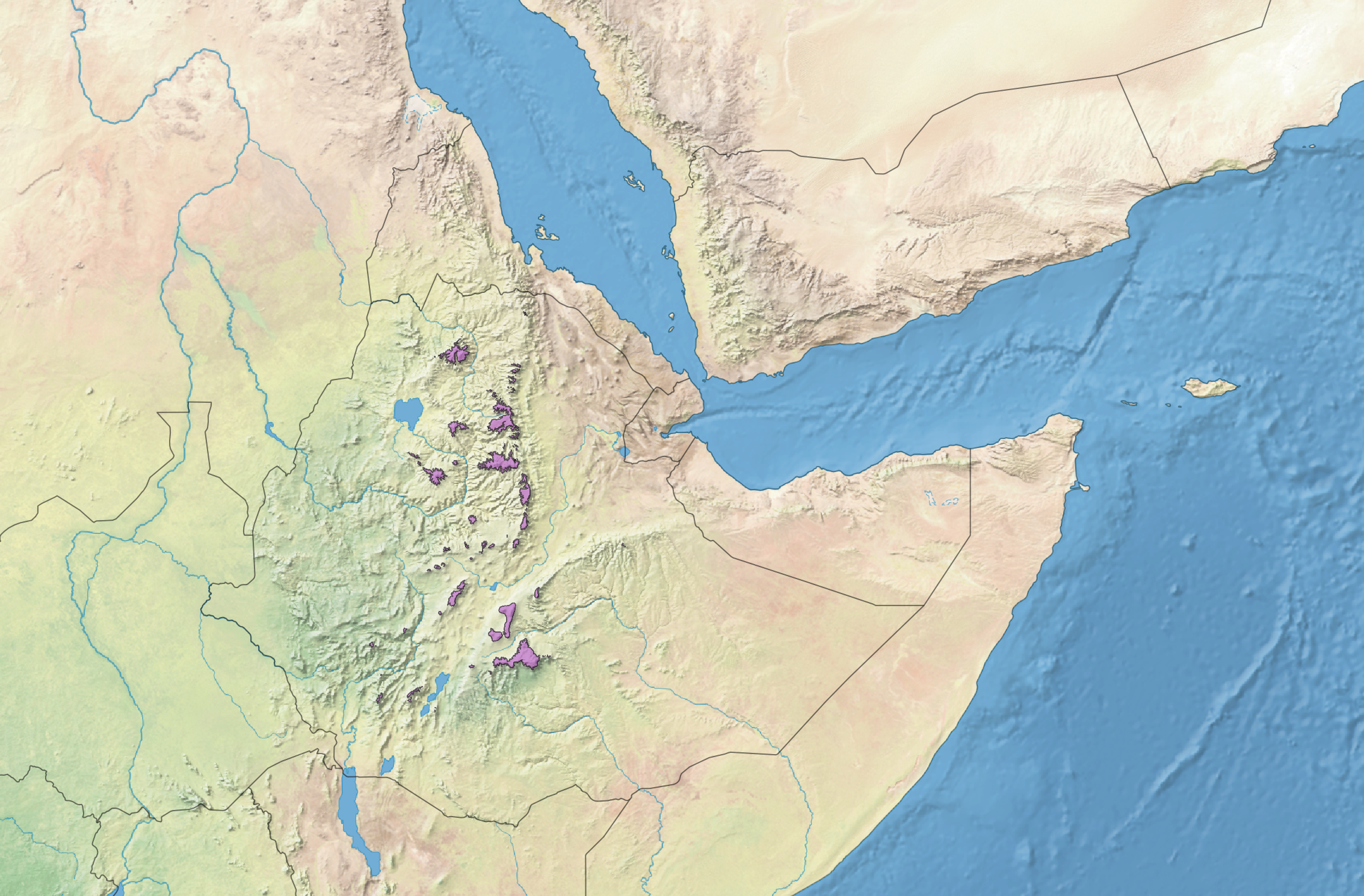
- Map of the Ethiopian montane moorlands (purple)

Ecology
- Realm: Afrotropical
- Biome: montane grasslands and shrublands
- Borders: Ethiopian montane grasslands and woodlands

Geography
- Area: 25,209 km^{2} (9,733 sq mi)
- Country: Ethiopia

Conservation
- Conservation status: vulnerable
- Protected: 41.26%

The Ethiopian montane moorlands is a montane grasslands and shrublands ecoregion in Ethiopia. It lies above 3,000 meters elevation in the Ethiopian Highlands, the largest Afroalpine region in Africa. The montane moorlands lie above the tree line, and consist of grassland and moorland with abundant herbs and shrubs adapted to the high elevation conditions.

== Geography ==
The ecoregion occupies an area of 25,209 square kilometers (9,733 sq mi).

The ecoregion covers areas above 3,000 metres (9,800 ft) elevation, extending up to 4,550 meters on Ras Dashen, the highest peak in the Ethiopian Highlands. Below the montane moorlands is the Ethiopian montane grasslands and woodlands ecoregion.

The Sanetti Plateau in the Bale Mountains is the largest single area of moorland.

== Climate ==
The ecoregion has a montane tropical climate. Rainfall varies across the ecoregion – as high as 2,500 mm in the southwest, and as little as 1,000 mm in the north. There is an annual dry season, which can last for only two months in the southwest and up to ten 10 months in the north. Frosts are common throughout the year, especially in the November-to-March winter months.

== Flora ==
The main vegetation plant communities are moorland, grassland, and herb meadow. The moorland is characterized by shrubs from a half-meter to a meter high, including tree heath (Erica arborea), Erica trimera, and other shrubs. The giant lobelia Lobelia rhynchopetalum can reach up to 6 meters when flowering. Herbs and grasses grow between the shrubs, including species of Helichrysum, Alchemilla, and Cerastium, and the grasses Festuca spp. and Aira spp. The sedge Carex monostachya is common in wet areas.

Six Afro-alpine plant communities occur in the Guassa Community Conservation Area of the northern Highlands – Festuca grassland, Euryops-Alchemilla shrubland, Mima mound (Euryops-Festuca grassland), Erica moorland, Helichrysum-Festuca grassland, and swamp grassland. Guassa is the local name for four species of native Festuca bunchgrasses which are valued by local communities for thatching and rope- and basket-making.

== Fauna ==
The endangered Ethiopian wolf (Canis simensis) is endemic to the ecoregion. It lives in open moorlands where it hunts rodents. There are two subspecies – a northern subspecies, C. s. simensis, which lives north of the Rift Valley, and the southeastern subspecies, C. s. citernii, which lives in Bale Mountains National Park and surrounding areas.

Of the 14 rodent species endemic to the Ethiopian Highlands, six are endemic to the montane moorlands ecoregion. These include the Ethiopian mole-rat (Tachyoryctes macrocephalus), Nikolaus' mouse (Megadendromus nikolausi), Ethiopian narrow-headed rat (Stenocephalemys albocaudata), gray-tailed narrow-headed rat (Stenocephalemys griseicauda), and black-clawed brush-furred rat (Lophuromys melanonyx).

== Protected areas ==
41.26% of the ecoregion is in protected areas. Protected areas in the ecoregion include Simien Mountains National Park, Bale Mountains National Park, Arsi Mountains National Park, and Chebera Churchura National Park.
