= Kuloa michelsonii =

Conservation status
- Vulnerable (IUCN 3.1)

Scientific classification
- Kingdom: Plantae
- Clade: Tracheophytes
- Clade: Angiosperms
- Clade: Magnoliids
- Order: Laurales
- Family: Lauraceae
- Genus: Kuloa
- Species: K. michelsonii

Binomial name
- Kuloa michelsonii (Robyns & R.Wilczek) Trofimov

Synonyms
- Ocotea michelsonii Robyns & R.Wilczek

Species of tree

Kuloa michelsonii (synonym Ocotea michelsonii) is a species of tree in the laurel family (Lauraceae). It is native to Rwanda and the eastern Democratic Republic of the Congo.

Kuloa michelsonii grows in montane forest from 1,100 to 2,500 metres elevation.
