= Kuloa ikonyokpe =

Conservation status
- Critically Endangered (IUCN 3.1)

Scientific classification
- Kingdom: Plantae
- Clade: Tracheophytes
- Clade: Angiosperms
- Clade: Magnoliids
- Order: Laurales
- Family: Lauraceae
- Genus: Kuloa
- Species: K. ikonyokpe

Binomial name
- Kuloa ikonyokpe (van der Werff) Trofimov

Synonyms
- Ocotea ikonyokpe van der Werff

Species of tree

Kuloa ikonyokpe (synonym Ocotea ikonyokpe) is a species of tree in the laurel family (Lauraceae). It is endemic to Cameroon.

Kuloa ikonyokpe is tree which grows up to 40 metres tall. It grows in hill forests just outside the boundary of the Rumpi Hills Wildlife Sanctuary.
