= Stomphastis heringi =

Scientific classification
- Kingdom: Animalia
- Phylum: Arthropoda
- Class: Insecta
- Order: Lepidoptera
- Family: Gracillariidae
- Genus: Stomphastis
- Species: S. heringi

Binomial name
- Stomphastis heringi Vári, 1963

Species of moth

Stomphastis heringi is a moth of the family Gracillariidae. It is known from Ethiopia.

The larvae feed on Croton macrostachyus. They probably mine the leaves of their host plant.
