= Platypterocarpus =

Conservation status
- Endangered (IUCN 3.1)

Scientific classification
- Kingdom: Plantae
- Clade: Tracheophytes
- Clade: Angiosperms
- Clade: Eudicots
- Clade: Rosids
- Order: Celastrales
- Family: Celastraceae
- Genus: Platypterocarpus; Dunkley & Brenan (1948)
- Species: P. tanganyikensis

Binomial name
- Platypterocarpus tanganyikensis Dunkley & Brenan (1948)

Genus of flowering plants

Platypterocarpus tanganyikensis is a species of flowering plant in the family Celastraceae. It is a tree endemic to the West Usambara Mountains of Tanzania, where it grows 13 to 27 meters tall. It is the sole species in genus Platypterocarpus.

It grows in the transition zone between wet and dry Afromontane forest from 1500 to 1900 meters elevation, where it is fairly common in Podocarpus–Juniperus–Ocotea forest on grey sandy soil.
