= Kuloa usambarensis =

Scientific classification
- Kingdom: Plantae
- Clade: Tracheophytes
- Clade: Angiosperms
- Clade: Magnoliids
- Order: Laurales
- Family: Lauraceae
- Genus: Kuloa
- Species: K. usambarensis

Binomial name
- Kuloa usambarensis (Engl.) Trofimov & Rohwer

Synonyms
- Ocotea usambarensis Engl.

Species of tree

Kuloa usambarensis (synonym Ocotea usambarensis) is a species of tree in the laurel family (Lauraceae). It is native to eastern Africa in Kenya, Tanga Region of Tanzania, and locally in Uganda, where it occurs at 1600–2600 m elevation in high rainfall Afromontane cloud forest. Common names include East African camphorwood, mkulo (Tanzania), mwiha (Uganda), muwong, muthaiti, and maasi.

== Description ==
It is a large evergreen tree growing to 35 m (exceptionally 45 m) tall, with fast growth (up to 2 m per year) when young. The leaves are opposite (sometimes alternate on fast-growing stems), elliptic to oval, 4–16 cm long and 2.5–9 cm wide, dark green above, pale below, with an entire margin and an acuminate apex. The foliage has a distinct scent of camphor. The flowers are inconspicuous, greenish-yellow; the fruit is a small drupe 1 cm long.

== Uses ==
It is an important timber tree, valued for the resistance of its wood to fungal decay.
