= Kuloa =

Scientific classification
- Kingdom: Plantae
- Clade: Tracheophytes
- Clade: Angiosperms
- Clade: Magnoliids
- Order: Laurales
- Family: Lauraceae
- Genus: Kuloa; Trofimov & Rohwer

Species
- Kuloa ikonyokpe (van der Werff) Trofimov; Kuloa michelsonii (Robyns & R.Wilczek) Trofimov; Kuloa usambarensis (Engl.) Trofimov & Rohwer

Genus of flowering plants

Kuloa is a genus of plants in the laurel family (Lauraceae). It contains three species native to central Africa, which were previously classed in genus Ocotea.

== Accepted species ==
Three species are accepted:

- Kuloa ikonyokpe (van der Werff) Trofimov – Cameroon
- Kuloa michelsonii (Robyns & R.Wilczek) Trofimov – eastern Democratic Republic of the Congo and Rwanda
- Kuloa usambarensis (Engl.) Trofimov & Rohwer – eastern and central Africa, from Kenya to Malawi and the Democratic Republic of the Congo
