= Syzygium staudtii =

Scientific classification
- Kingdom: Plantae
- Clade: Tracheophytes
- Clade: Angiosperms
- Clade: Eudicots
- Clade: Rosids
- Order: Myrtales
- Family: Myrtaceae
- Genus: Syzygium
- Species: S. staudtii

Binomial name
- Syzygium staudtii (Engl.) Mildbr.

Synonyms
- Syzygium guineense subsp. bamendae F.White; Syzygium guineense subsp. obovatum F.White; Syzygium guineense subsp. occidentale F.White; Syzygium guineense var. staudtii Engl.; Syzygium marounzense Pellegr.; Syzygium montanum Aubrév.

Species of tree

Syzygium staudtii is a species of tree in the myrtle family (Myrtaceae), It is native to tropical rain forests in west and west-central Africa, including Guinea, Liberia, Côte d'Ivoire, Ghana, Cameroon, the Gulf of Guinea Islands, Gabon, Republic of the Congo, Central African Republic, Democratic Republic of the Congo, and Burundi.
