= Croton macrostachyus =

Conservation status
- Least Concern (IUCN 3.1)

Scientific classification
- Kingdom: Plantae
- Clade: Tracheophytes
- Clade: Angiosperms
- Clade: Eudicots
- Clade: Rosids
- Order: Malpighiales
- Family: Euphorbiaceae
- Genus: Croton
- Species: C. macrostachyus

Binomial name
- Croton macrostachyus Hochst. ex Delile

Synonyms
- Croton acuminatus R.Br.; Croton butaguensis De Wild.; Croton guerzesiensis Beille ex A.Chev.; Croton guerzesiensis Beille nom. illeg.; Croton macrostachyus var. mollissimus Chiov.; Oxydectes macrostachya (Hochst. ex Delile) Kuntze; Rottlera schimperi Hochst. & Steud.

Species of flowering plant

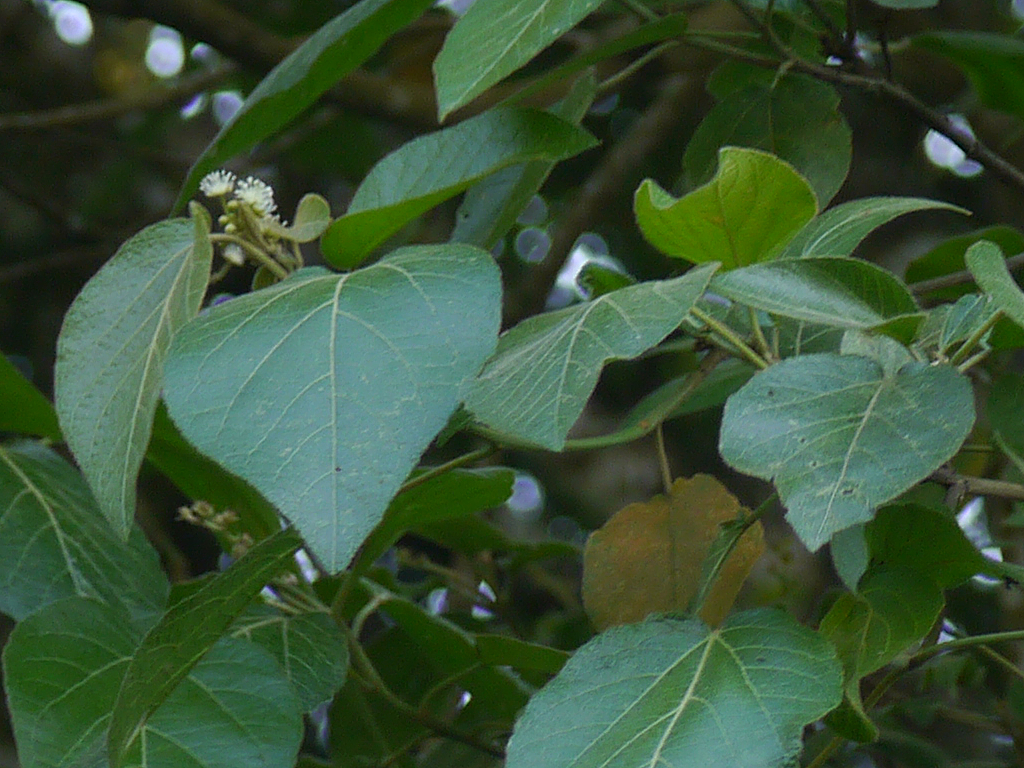
C. macrostachyus

Croton macrostachyus is a species of flowering plant native to the mountains of Sub-Saharan Africa.

== Description ==
Croton macrostachyus is a deciduous tree. It generally grows 6 to 12 meters tall, and occasionally up to 30 meters. It has a spreading, rounded, and open crown, and a cylindrical bole which can grow up to 100 cm in diameter.

== Range and habitat ==
Croton macrostachyus ranges across the mountains of Sub-Saharan Africa, including the Guinea Highlands of Guinea, Liberia, and Côte d'Ivoire, the Cameroon Highlands of Cameroon and Nigeria, the highlands of central Angola, and the mountains of eastern Africa from the Ethiopian Highlands through the mountains of the Eastern Rift, Albertine Rift, and Southern Rift to Mount Tumbine in Mozambique and the Eastern Highlands of Zimbabwe.

It inhabits Afromontane evergreen forest, Brachystegia woodland, and wooded grassland. It is often found on rocky hillsides, in evergreen riverine and gully forests, in swamp forests, and on termitaria between 825 and 1,830 meters elevation, and occasionally up to 2,165 meters.

== Ecology ==
Croton macrostachyus is a food plant for the butterfly Charaxes candiope and the moths Nudaurelia gueinzii and Stomphastis heringi.

== Uses ==
Croton macrostachyus has a wide range of uses, including timber, agroforestry, medicine, and as an ornamental plant.

The plant is fast-growing and drought-tolerant, and is used in reforestation projects, for erosion control, and as a shade tree in coffee plantations. Its flowers are attractive to bees, and its leaves are used for mulch and green manure to improve soil. It is also used as a hedge or an ornamental and shade tree in gardens.

Its wood is cream-colored, moderately soft, of medium weight, and perishable. It is used for carpentry, boxes, crates, and tools, but more frequently for fuel and charcoal.

The plant is somewhat toxic, but most parts of the plant are used for a variety of medical treatments, particularly for ridding the body of parasites and toxins and treating skin conditions. Juice from crushed leaves is used as an anthelmintic, applied to wounds to hasten clotting, and used to treat sores, warts, ringworm, and itchy scalp. Root decoctions are also used as an anthelmintic and to treat malaria and venereal diseases. Root decoctions and the oil from seeds are used as a purgative or as an abortifacient.
