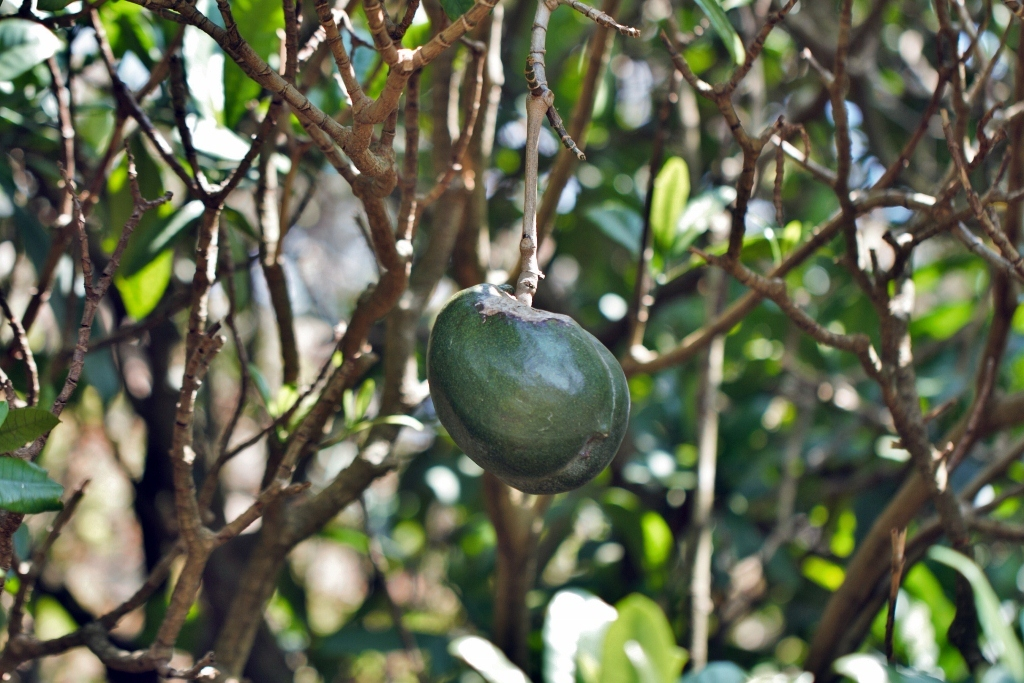
- In Zimbabwe

Conservation status
- Least Concern (IUCN 3.1)

Scientific classification
- Kingdom: Plantae
- Clade: Embryophytes
- Clade: Tracheophytes
- Clade: Spermatophytes
- Clade: Angiosperms
- Clade: Eudicots
- Clade: Asterids
- Order: Gentianales
- Family: Apocynaceae
- Genus: Tabernaemontana
- Species: T. stapfiana

Binomial name
- Tabernaemontana stapfiana Britten

Synonyms
- Conopharyngia bequaertii De Wild.; Conopharyngia johnstonii Stapf; Conopharyngia stapfiana (Britten) Stapf; Sarcopharyngia stapfiana (Britten) Boiteau; Tabernaemontana johnstonii (Stapf) Pichon

= Tabernaemontana stapfiana =

Species of plant

Tabernaemontana stapfiana, commonly known as soccerball fruit, is a medium-sized tree in the family Apocynaceae. Its flowers feature white with yellow-throated corolla lobes. The fruit is fleshy grey-green, in pairs, each up to 20 cm (8 in) in diameter and weighing up to several kilograms. Its habitat is montane evergreen forests from 700–2,000 m (2,300–6,600 ft) elevation. The plant is native to an area of Africa from Uganda south to Mozambique.
