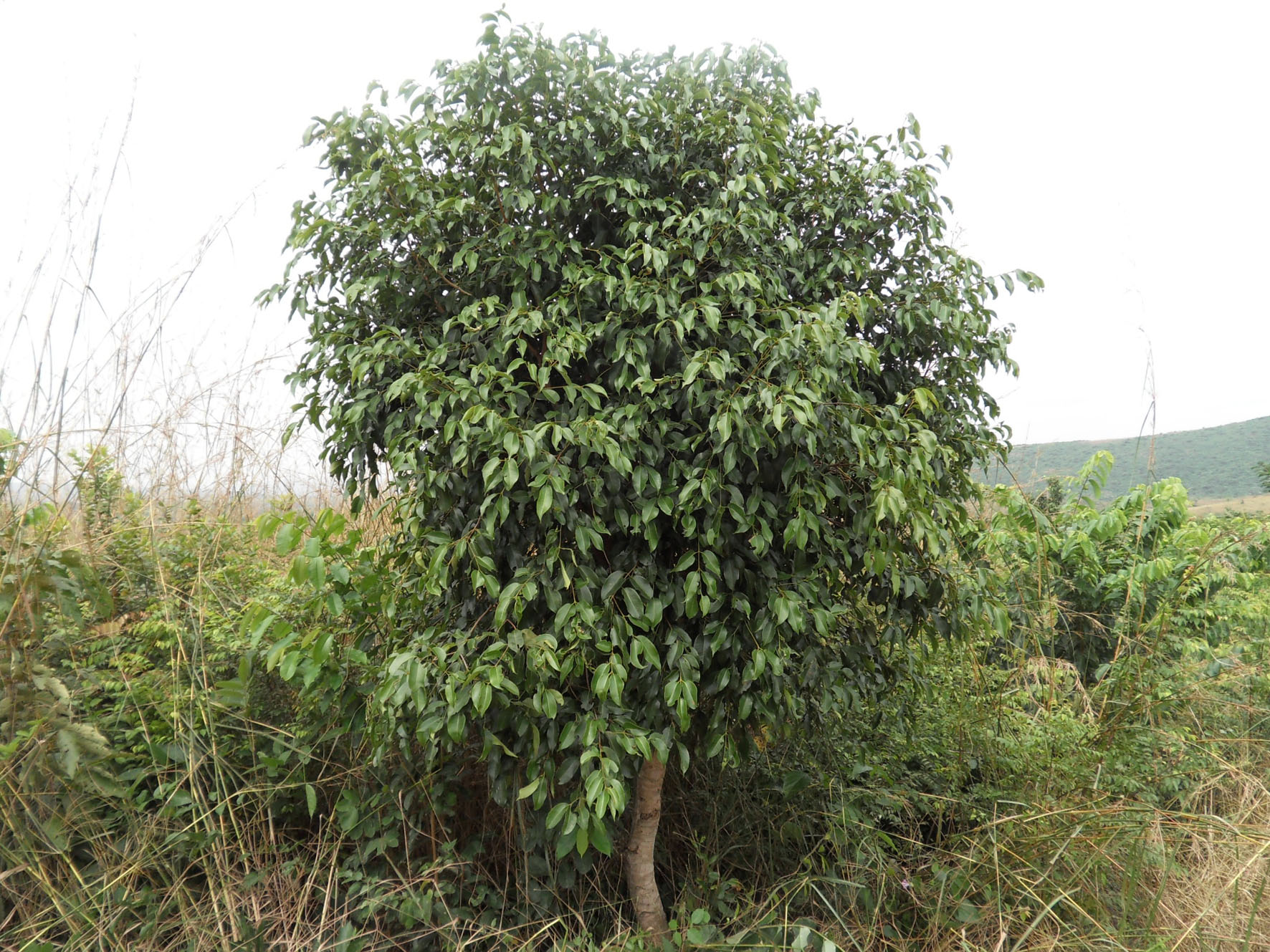

Conservation status
- Least Concern (IUCN 3.1)

Scientific classification
- Kingdom: Plantae
- Clade: Tracheophytes
- Clade: Angiosperms
- Clade: Eudicots
- Clade: Rosids
- Order: Myrtales
- Family: Myrtaceae
- Genus: Syzygium
- Species: S. guineense

Binomial name
- Syzygium guineense (Willd.) DC.

Synonyms
- Calyptranthes guineensis Willd.; Eugenia fourcadei Dummer; Eugenia guineensis (Willd.) Baill.; Memecylon lopezianum A.Chev.; Syzygium fourcadei (Dummer) Burtt Davy

= Syzygium guineense =

Species of tree

Syzygium guineense (Bambara: Kokisa) is an evergreen leafy forest tree of the family Myrtaceae, found in many parts of Africa both wild and domesticated. Both its fruits and leaves are edible; the pulp and the fruit skin are sucked and the seed discarded. It is sometimes called "waterberry", but this may also refer to other species of Syzygium.

== Description ==
Syzygium guineense can grow as a tree, a shrub, or a pyrophytic subshrub, depending on its habitat. As a tree its height is usually between 10 and 15 meters, but some specimens have been found as tall as 25 meters. The trunk is broad and fluted and the crown rounded and heavy, with a bark that is smooth when young, but becomes rough and black with age. The branches are dropping, the stems are thick and angular. The young leaves are purple-red in color, but as they mature their color becomes dark green; the leaves in general are shiny and smooth on both surfaces, with a tip that is long but rounded, on a short grooved stalk. The flowers of S. guineense have white, showy stamens, in dense branched heads 10 centimeters across, yielding a honey-sweet smell that attracts many insects.

== Range and habitat ==
Syzygium guineense ranges widely through sub-Saharan Africa, and is also present in the southwestern Arabian Peninsula.

It grows in a range of habitats, including lowland and montane forests, forest edges, woodlands, humid savannas, swamps, and mangrove edges, from sea level up to 2,500 meters elevation. It prefers moist soils with a high water table beside rivers, but will also grow in open woodland.

== Uses ==
In southern Ethiopia S. guineense is a much-appreciated shade tree for both the homestead and the home garden. It is considered a famine food, eaten by subsistence farmers when their crops fail.

== Classification ==
Syzygium guineense is a highly variable species, leading to debate concerning its taxonomy, including its subspecies. Frank White lists described eight subspecies: afromontanum, bamendae, gerrardi, legatii, obovatum, occidentale, parvifolium, and pachyphyllum. Subsp. legatii is a suffrutex. Many other subspecies and varieties have been proposed. Plants of the World Online considers subspecies afromontanum to be a separate species, Syzygium afromontanum, synonym barotsense the species Syzygium barotsense, synonym gerrardi the species Syzygium gerrardi, synonym huillense the species Syzygium huillense, synonym parvifolium the species Syzygium parvifolium, and subspecies bamendae, obovatum, occidentale, and staudtii synonyms of Syzygium staudtii.
