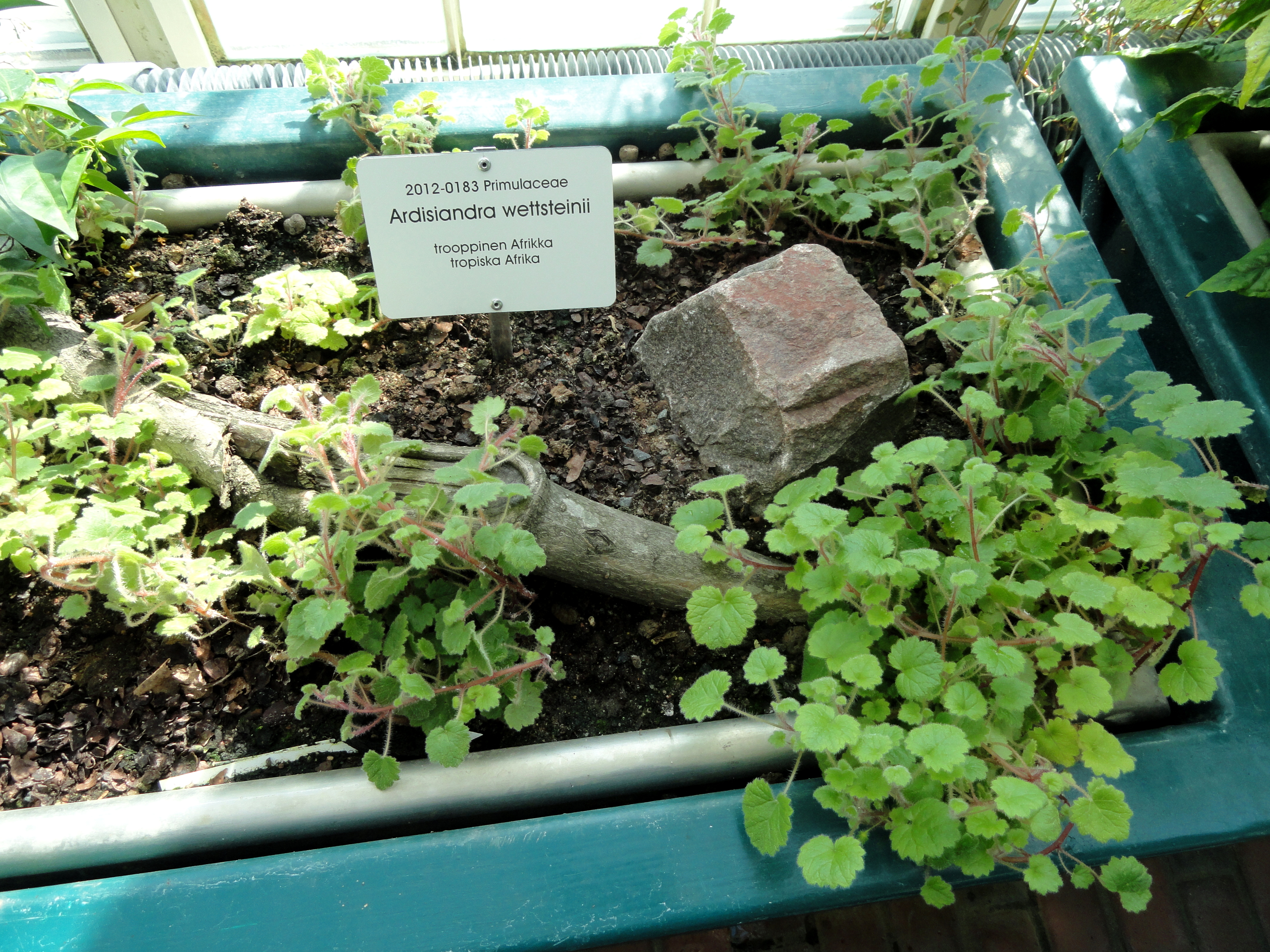
- Ardisiandra wettsteinii

Scientific classification
- Kingdom: Plantae
- Clade: Tracheophytes
- Clade: Angiosperms
- Clade: Eudicots
- Clade: Asterids
- Order: Ericales
- Family: Primulaceae
- Genus: Ardisiandra; Hook.f.

= Ardisiandra =

Genus of flowering plants

Ardisiandra is a genus of flowering plants belonging to the family Primulaceae.

Its native range is Tropical African Mountains.

Species:

- Ardisiandra primuloides R.Knuth
- Ardisiandra sibthorpioides Hook.f.
- Ardisiandra wettsteinii J.Wagner
