= Bouba Njida National Park =

National park in Cameroon

- IUCN category II (national park)
- Location within Cameroon
- Location: Cameroon
- Coordinates: 8°37′25″N 14°39′24″E
- Area: 2,200 km^{2} (850 sq mi)
- Established: 1980

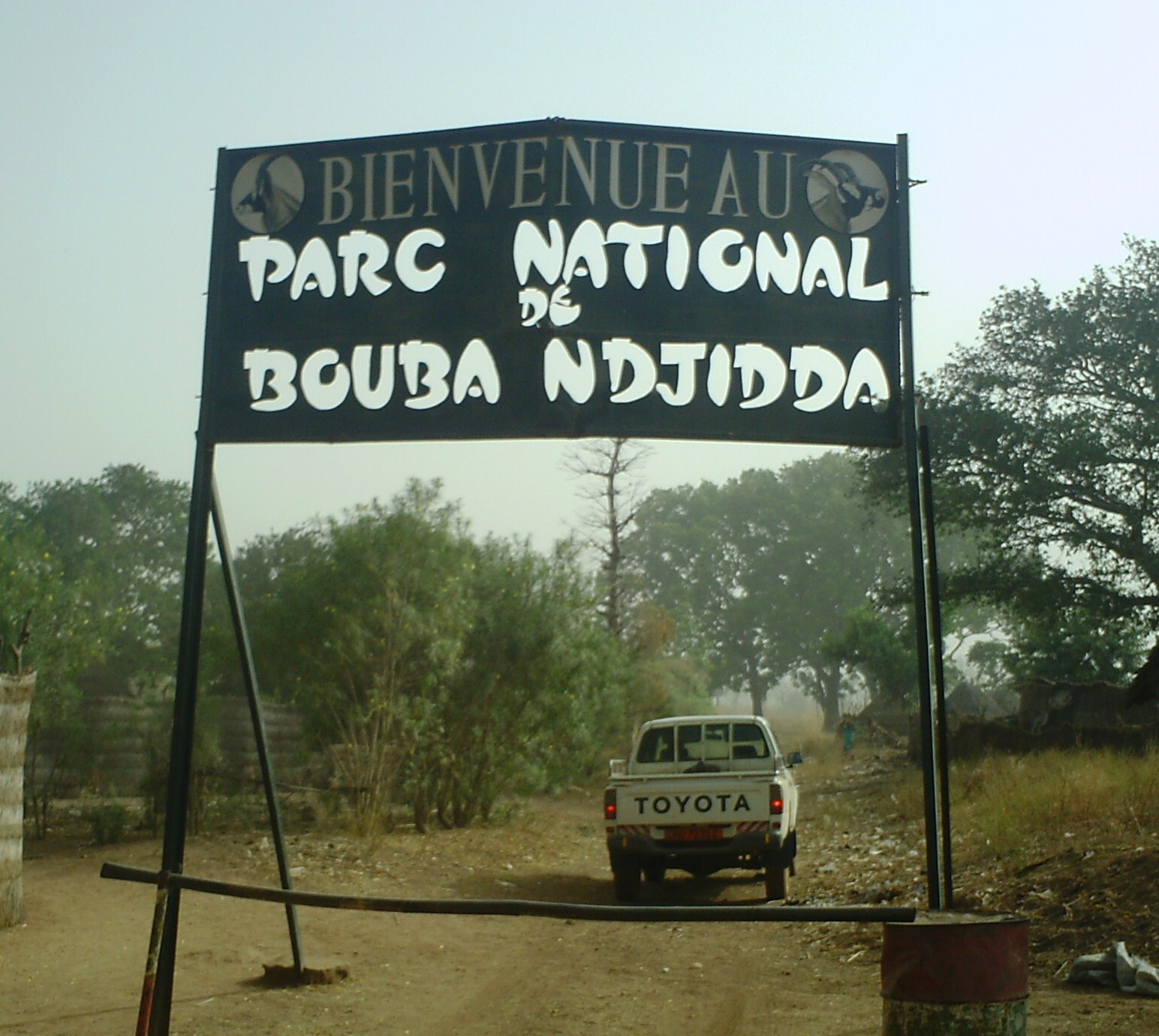
Bouba Ndjida National Park in Cameroon

Bouba Njida National Park is a national park of Cameroon. A total of 23 antelope species occur in the park. The painted hunting dog, Lycaon pictus, had been observed in Bouba Njida National Park at the start of the 21st century. This population of the endangered canid is one of the few that remained in Cameroon as of the year 2000.

In 2012, heavily armed poachers from Chad and Sudan massacred some 200 savannah elephants while on horseback thus wiping out more than half of the elephant population of the Bouba N’Djida National Park.

== Background ==
Bouba Njida National Park covers an area of 2,200 square kilometers (850 square miles). Initially it was established as a reserve in 1932. It was upgraded to level of park in 1980. The park is reported habitat is of savannah forest and the average elevation varies from 251 to 864 m (823 to 2,835 ft). The park receives an average annual rainfall of 1,082 mm (42.6 in). The park is categorized under IUCN II. The painted hunting dog, Lycaon pictus, considered critically endangered by IUCN has a count of 60 within Cameroon and they are reported from this park apart from two other national parks in the country. A total of 23 antelope species occur in the park.

== See also ==
- Wildlife of Cameroon
- Protected areas of Cameroon
- Communes of Cameroon
