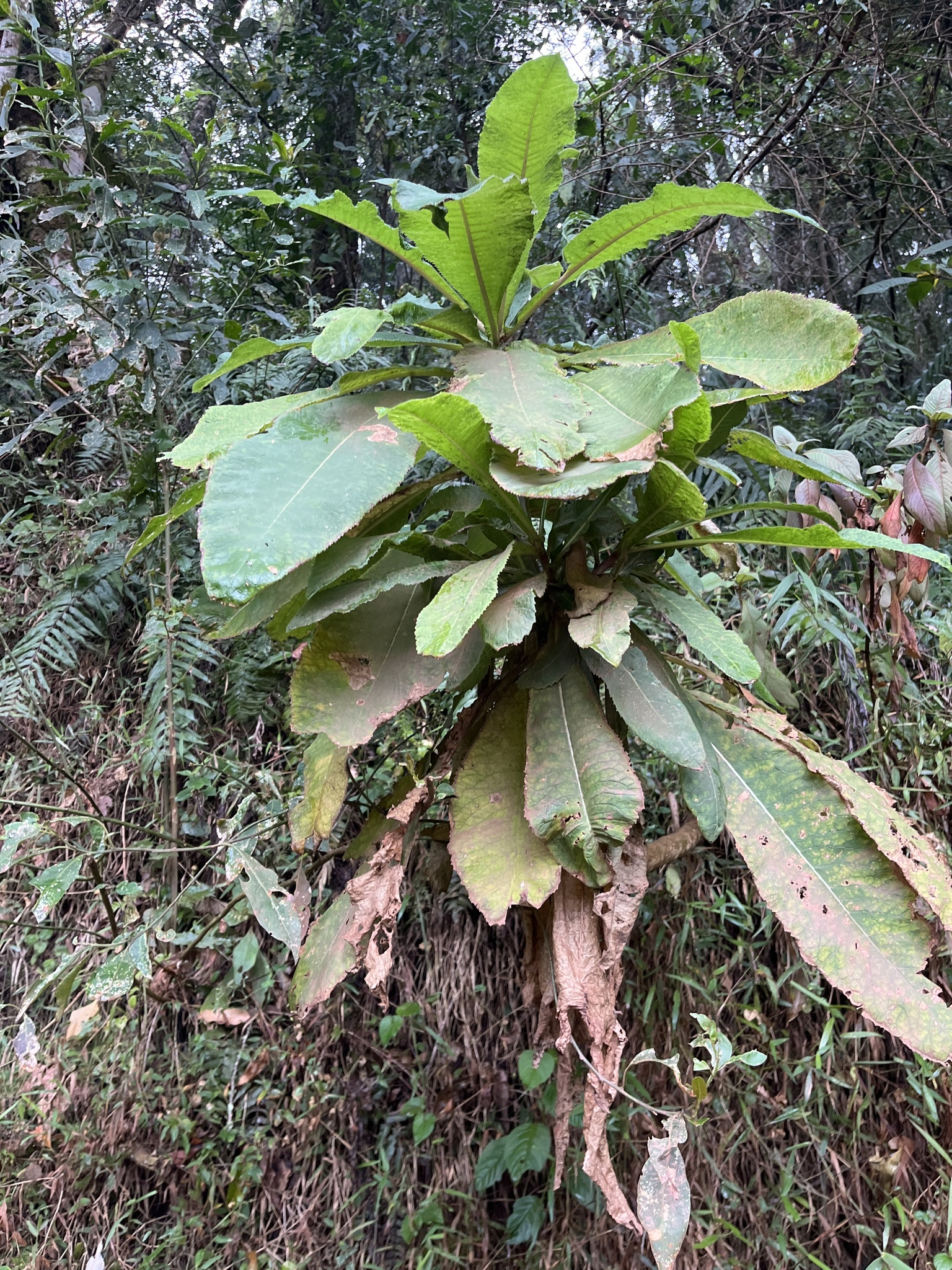
- Lobelia giberroa, Bwindi Impenetrable Forest, Rwanda

Scientific classification
- Kingdom: Plantae
- Clade: Tracheophytes
- Clade: Angiosperms
- Clade: Eudicots
- Clade: Asterids
- Order: Asterales
- Family: Campanulaceae
- Genus: Lobelia
- Species: L. giberroa

Binomial name
- Lobelia giberroa Hemsl.

Synonyms
- Dortmanna giberroa (Hemsl.) Kuntze; Tupa schimperi Hochst. ex A.Rich.; Lobelia giberroa var. intermedia (Hauman) Robyns; Lobelia giberroa var. iringensis E.Wimm.; Lobelia giberroa var. longibracteata Hauman; Lobelia giberroa var. mionandra E.Wimm.; Lobelia giberroa subsp. squarrosa (Baker f.) Mabb.; Lobelia giberroa var. ulugurensis (Engl.) Hauman; Lobelia giberroa var. usafuensis (Engl.) Hauman; Lobelia giberroa var. volkensii (Engl.) Hauman; Lobelia intermedia Hauman; Lobelia squarrosa Baker f.; Lobelia ulugurensis (Engl.) Engl. ex R.E.Fr. & T.C.E.Fr.; Lobelia usafuensis Engl.; Lobelia volkensii var. ulugurensis Engl.; Rapuntium volkensii (Engl.) Kuntze

= Lobelia giberroa =

Species of plant

Lobelia giberroa is a flowering plant in the family Campanulaceae. It is native to the Mountains of the Moon Massif (Rwenzori Mountains) in Uganda. It is the tallest of all the giant Lobelia species at up to 10 metres (33 ft) tall. Its creme de menthe flowers form a spikelike raceme.
