= Cincinnobotrys =

Scientific classification
- Kingdom: Plantae
- Clade: Tracheophytes
- Clade: Angiosperms
- Clade: Eudicots
- Clade: Rosids
- Order: Myrtales
- Family: Melastomataceae
- Genus: Cincinnobotrys; Gilg

Synonyms
- Gravesiella A.Fern. & R.Fern.; Haplophyllophora A.Fern. & R.Fern.; Primularia Brenan

Genus of flowering plants

Cincinnobotrys is a genus of flowering plants belonging to the family Melastomataceae.

Its native range is Tropical Africa.

Species:

- Cincinnobotrys acaulis (Cogn.) Gilg
- Cincinnobotrys burttianus T. Pócs
- Cincinnobotrys felicis (A.Chev.) Jacq.-Fél.
- Cincinnobotrys letouzeyi Jacq.-Fél.
- Cincinnobotrys malayanus Kosterm.
- Cincinnobotrys oreophilus Gilg
- Cincinnobotrys pauwelsianus Maluma & Geerinck
- Cincinnobotrys pulchellus (Brenan) Jacq.-Fél.
- Cincinnobotrys ranarum Pócs
- Cincinnobotrys speciosus (A.Fern. & R.Fern.) Jacq.-Fél.
