= Chebera Churchura National Park =

National park in South West Ethiopia Peoples' Region, Ethiopia

- IUCN category II (national park)
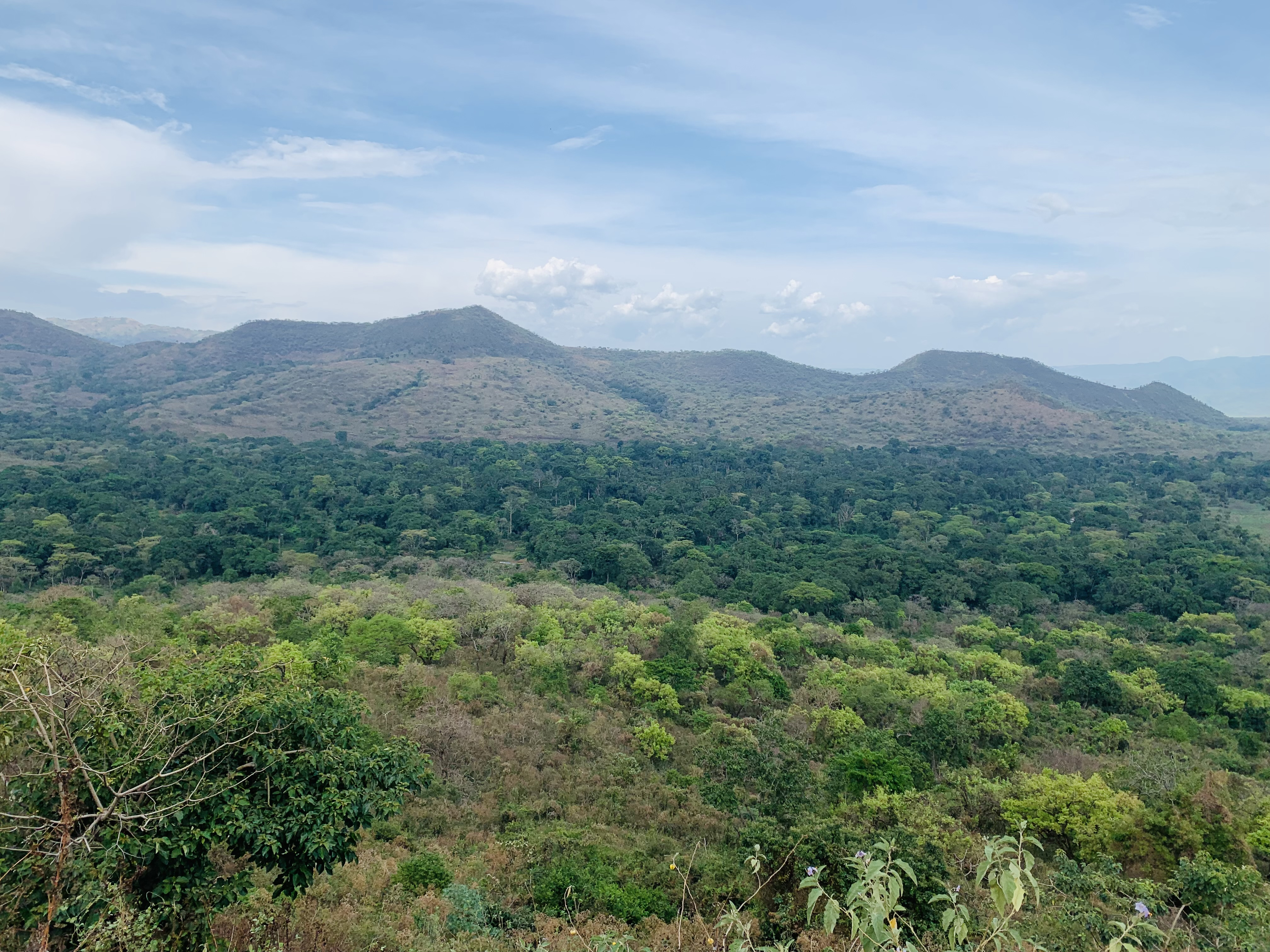

- Location within Ethiopia
- Location: South West Ethiopia Peoples' Region, Ethiopia
- Nearest city: Bonga
- Coordinates: 6.87°N 36.66°E
- Established: 2006
- Governing body: Office of Culture Sport and Tourism (OCST) of Southern Nations, Nationalities, and Peoples' Region

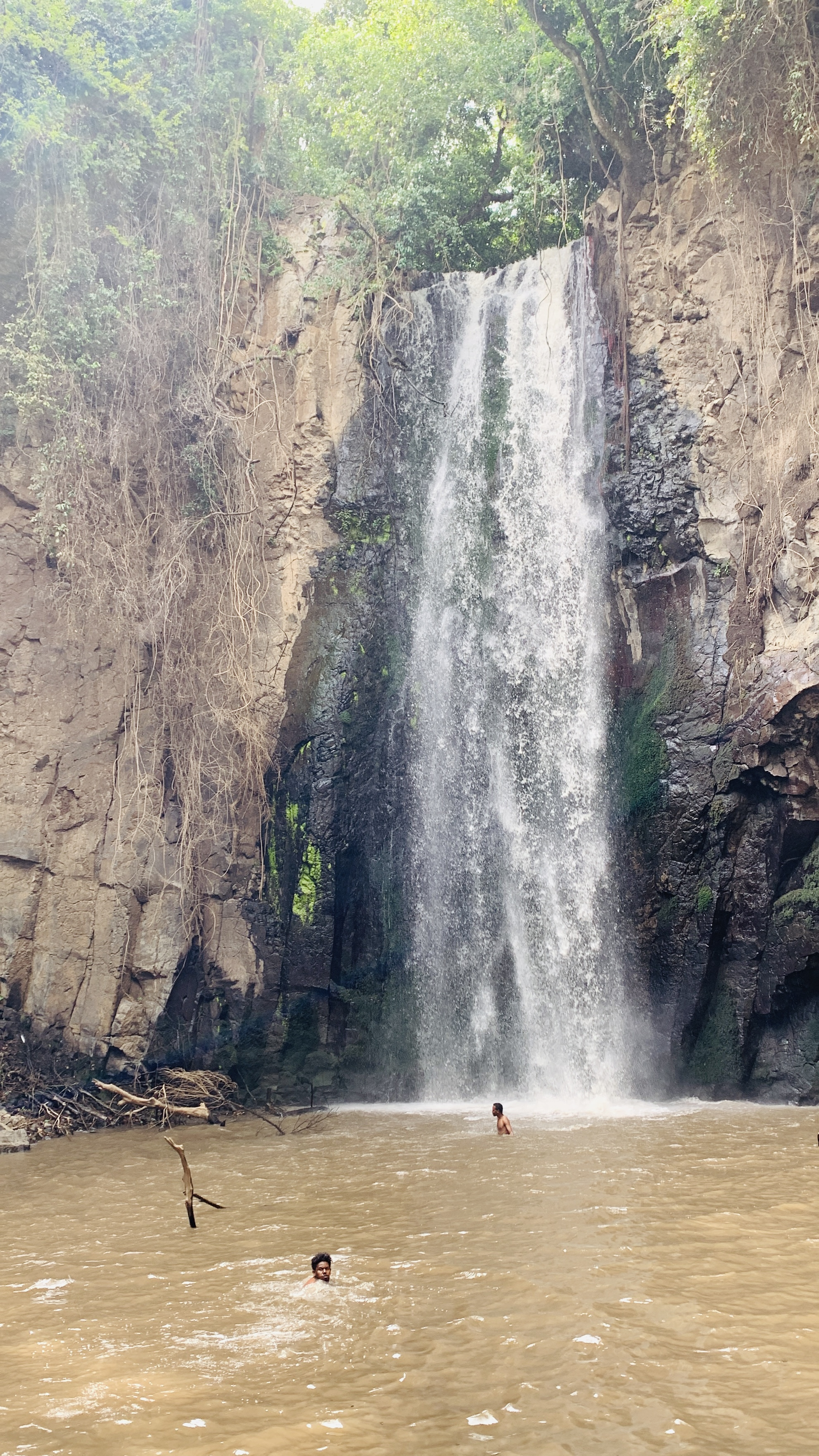
Waterfall at Chebera Churchura National Park

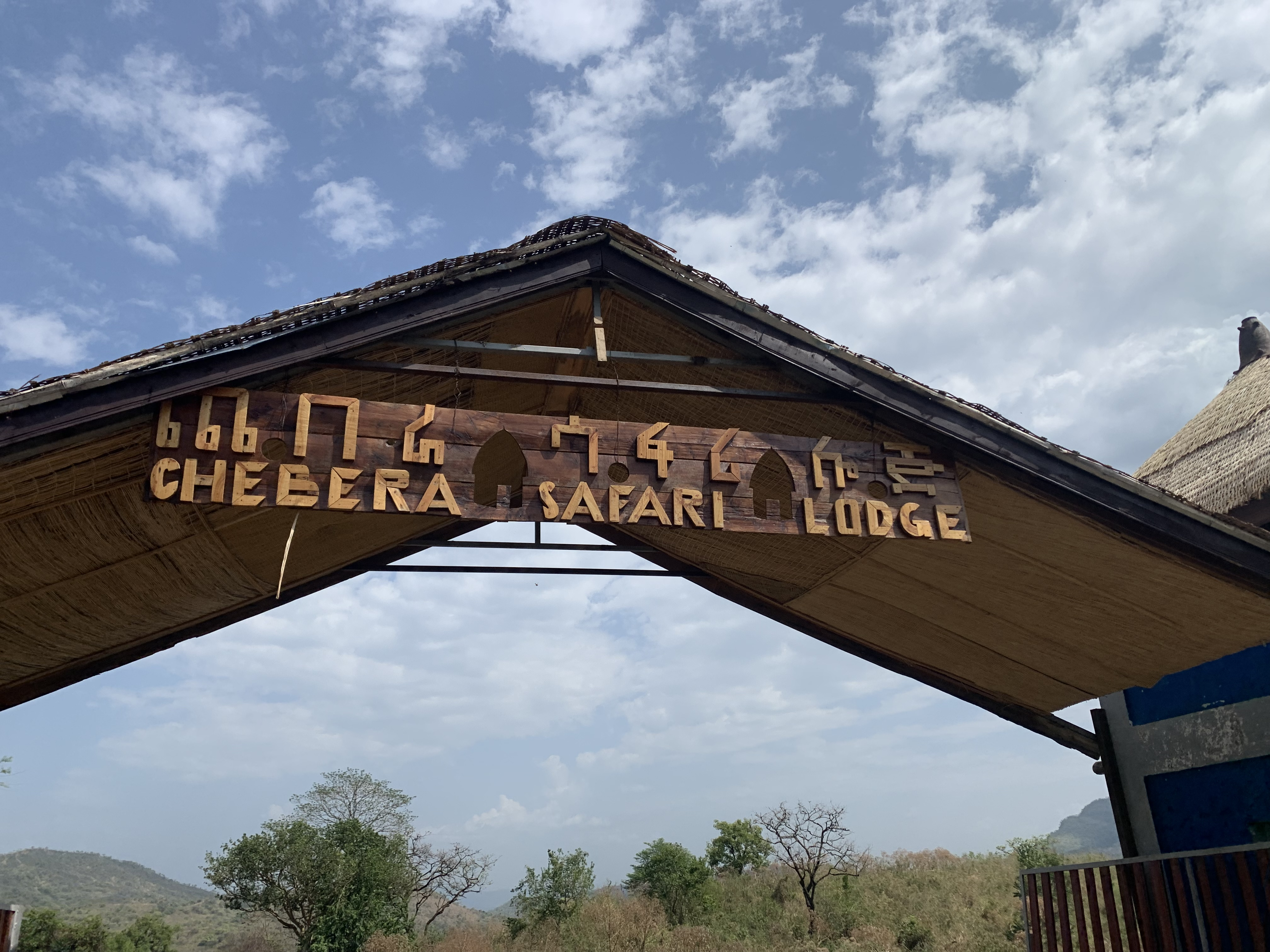
Chebera Safari Lodge Entrance in the park

Chebera Churchura National Park is a national park located on the western side of the central Omo Gibe basin, in between the Dawro zone and Konta zone in South West Ethiopia Peoples' Region in the southwest of Ethiopia. The park is located 133 km south from Jimma and 483 km southwest from Addis Ababa.

== History ==
The Chebera Churchura national park used to be the Kulo-Konta controlled hunting area set for hunting elephants before being upgraded to a national park in 2005 by the regional government.

== Geography ==
The park has a total area of 1250 square kilometres and elevation ranges from 500-2000 meters above sea level. The annual rain fall ranges from 1200 mm to 2300 mm and temperature ranges from 10-29°C. Wet seasons are from March to September and dry seasons are from December to February. The park harbors four small crater lakes such as Keriballa, Koka, and Shasho. There are 49 perennial rivers crossing the park. The river Zinga which is one of the tributaries of the Omo river rises from the northeast highlands of the area and cross the central part of the park. The Shoshuma river rises from the northwestern highlands of konta area flows across the northeastern part of the park and joins the Zinga river inside the park and drain to Omo river. There are also natural caves existing in the park. the park also contains various hot and cold springs like Toshima, Nechwuha, and waterfalls like Barbo waterfall.

== Ecology ==
=== Flora ===
The park contains four types of habitats, grasslands, wood lands, mountain forest and riverine forests. Most of the park which is covered by 62% is wooded grassland dominated by elephant grass (Pennisetum purpureum), with montane woodland comprising 29% along with woodland and riparian forest the rest. Palm trees are significantly diverse within the park's ecoregion. Dominant woody vegetation includes Ficus, Combretum, Ehretia, and Albizia species. The natural forest harbors non-timber forest products known for economic value such as Enset, Coffee, Coriander, and Piper species. So far 106 woody plant species were identified of which six are endemic to Ethiopia.

=== Fauna ===
==== Mammals ====
The park is home to 37 species of large mammals. It provides home to wild African elephants that are commonly rare within the protected forest areas and open grasslands, by which the park harbors over 500 individuals moving in different herds. Mammals that are also found in Chebera Churchura national park include lions, leopards, servals, greater kudus, colobus monkeys, vervet monkeys, hippopotamuses, defassa waterbucks, warthogs, and Cape buffalos.

==== Avifauna ====
There are 237 species of birds in the park. Among these species of birds, white-winged cliff chat, banded barbet, wattled ibis, Ethiopian oriole, and thick-billed raven are endemic to Ethiopia.
