= Harenna Forest =

Forest in Ethiopia

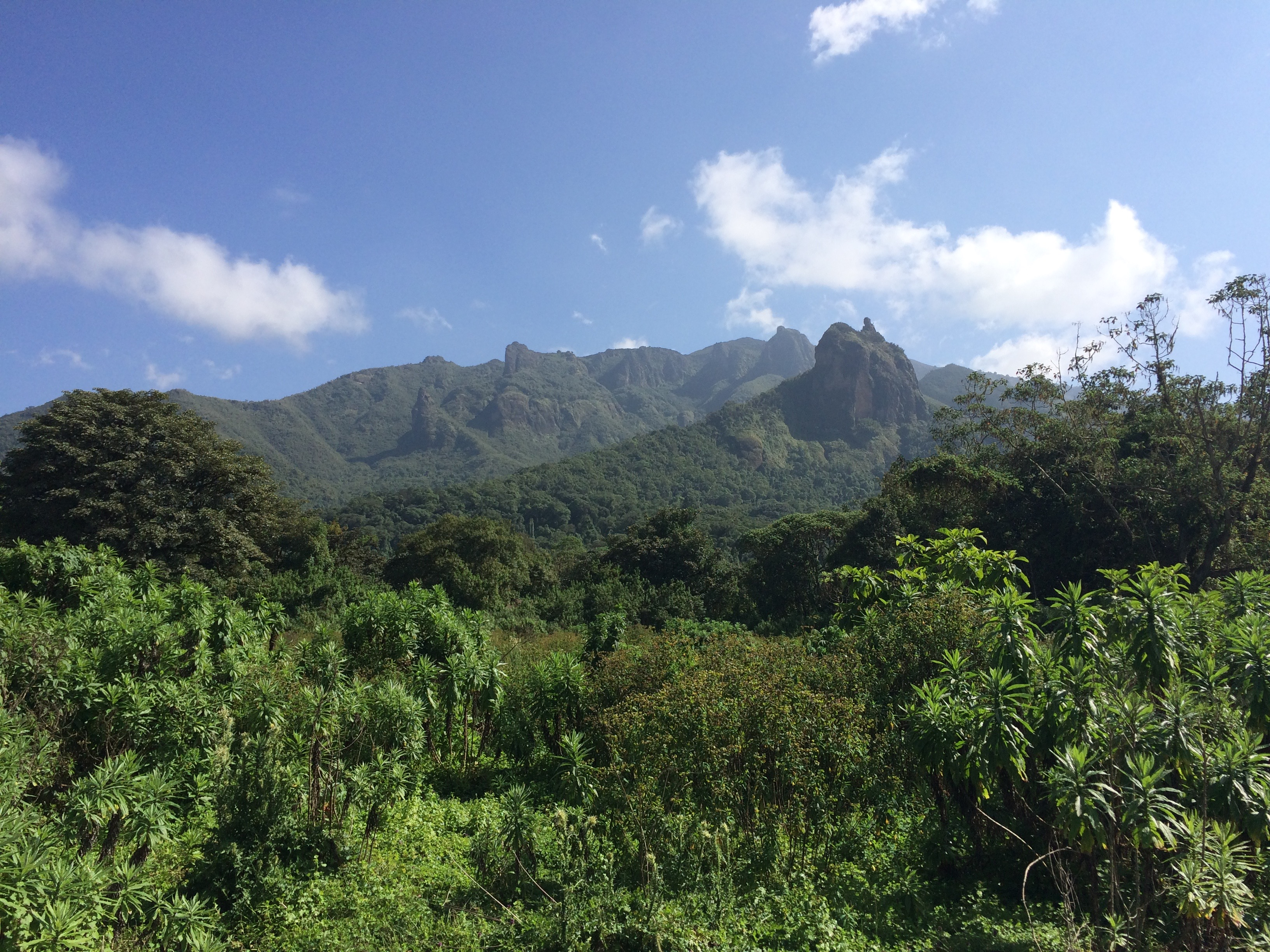
- Harenna Forest with the Bale Mountains behind

- Location within Ethiopia

Geography
- Location: Bale Mountains, Oromia Region, Ethiopia
- Coordinates: 6°30′48″N 39°14′50″E
- Elevation: 1,450–3,200 m (4,760–10,500 ft)
- Area: 3,500–7,000 km^{2} (1,400–2,700 sq mi)

Administration
- Governing body: Oromia Forest and Wildlife Enterprise (outside Bale Mountains National Park)

Ecology
- WWF Classification: Ethiopian montane forests
- Dominant tree species: Afrocarpus falcatus, Hagenia abyssinica, Yushania alpina

The Harenna Forest is a montane tropical evergreen forest in Ethiopia's Bale Mountains. The forest covers the southern slope of the mountains, extending from 1,450 to 3,200 meters (4,760 to 10,500 ft) elevation. The Bale Mountains are in Ethiopia's Oromia Region, in the southeastern part of the Ethiopian Highlands.

It is one of the few remaining natural forests in the country, and the second-largest moist tropical forest in Ethiopia. The Harenna Forest is known for its native plants, mammals, amphibians and birds, including many endemic species. Part of the forest lies within Bale Mountains National Park, a World Heritage Site since 2023.

== Geography ==
The Harenna Forest extends across the southern slope of the Bale Mountains, from 1,450 to 3,200 meters (4,760 to 10,500 ft) elevation. The Bale Mountains are in the southeastern Ethiopian Highlands, in Oromia Region. The forest lies mainly in Harena Buluk woreda (district) in the southwest and Delo Menna woreda in the southeast, both in Bale Zone. It also covers portions of Goba and Meda Welabu woredas of Bale Zone, and Adaba woreda of West Arsi Zone.

The highest portion of the mountains, known as the Sanetti Plateau, extends above 4,000 meters (13,000 ft) elevation. The southern edge of the plateau drops in a steep escarpment, descending from 3,800 to 2,800 meters (12,500 to 9,200 ft) elevation. Below the escarpment the mountain slopes descend more gradually to the southern plains.

The forest is in the upper watershed of the Ganale River, and is drained by its tributaries the Welmel, Weyib, and Dumale rivers.

The forests cover an area of 3,500 to 7,000 square kilometers (1,400 to 2,700 sq mi), between 39°15′ and 40°15′ E longitude and 6°0′ and 6°45′ N latitude. The southern portion of Bale Mountains National Park protects part of the forest, which also extends outside the park boundary. The Harenna Forest is one of the few remaining natural forests in the country. Together with the adjacent Mena-Angetu forest, it forms the second-largest moist tropical forest in Ethiopia, and it is the country's largest cloud forest.

== Climate ==
The forest has a montane tropical climate. There is a rainy season from March to October, and a dry season from November to March. The slopes between 2,300 and 3,000 meters (7,500 and 9,800 ft) elevation are often covered in dense mist, particularly during the wet season.

== Flora ==
The Harenna Forest is known for its native plants, mammals, amphibians and birds, including many endemic species. The montane climate of the southern Bale Mountains sustains plant communities distinct from those of the adjacent lowlands, and from montane forests elsewhere in the Ethiopian Highlands. Plant communities in the forest vary with elevation.

Submontane forests occur from 1,450 to 1,900 meters (4,760 to 6,230 ft) elevation. Rainfall is from 500 to 600 mm (20 to 24 in) annually, with a distinct dry season. The predominant tree is the conifer Afrocarpus falcatus. Other canopy trees include Cassipourea malosana, Celtis africana, and Croton macrostachyus. Some trees are semi-deciduous, dropping leaves during the dry season. Wild coffee is a common shrub in the forest understory. The forest is one of the few places where people still harvest wild arabica coffee.

Lower montane forests grow between 1,900 and 2,300 meters (6,200 and 7,500 ft) elevation. Middle montane forests occur between 2,300 and 2,800 meters (7,500 and 9,200 ft). Upper montane forests, which include forests dominated by Hagenia abyssinica and extensive stands of the bamboo Yushania alpina, grow from 2,800 to 3,250 meters (9,190 to 10,660 ft) elevation.

Subalpine heathland, dominated by the tree heath Erica arborea, extends from 3,250 to 3,500 meters (10,660 to 11,480 ft) elevation, and forms the transition between the forest and the high-elevation alpine moorlands of the Sanetti Plateau.

The tree Gymnosporia harenensis is endemic to the forest, and is classified by the IUCN as vulnerable due to the threat of logging.

== Fauna ==
Giant forest hogs in the Harenna Forest

The Harenna Forest has a small population of the endangered African wild dog (Lycaon pictus), thought to be one of Ethiopia's last remaining packs. Lions live in the southern part of the forest, an unusual habitat for the species. Above the forest, Bale Mountains National Park holds more than half of the world population of the endangered Ethiopian wolf.

The Bale Mountains vervet (Chlorocebus djamdjamensis) is limited to the upper Harenna Forest and other nearby forests. In continuous forest, about four-fifths of its diet is Yushania alpina bamboo, mostly young leaves and shoots. The Harenna shrew (Crocidura harenna) is endemic to the forest, and the Bale shrew (Crocidura bottegoides) is found only in the forest and the afroalpine grasslands of the Sanetti Plateau.

The Harenna Forest is home to Ethiopia's only population of Harvey's duiker (Cephalophus harveyi).

== Conservation ==
Forest lands in Ethiopia, including the Harenna Forest, are government-owned. Bale Mountains National Park covers the central part of the forest. The portion of the forest outside the national park is managed by Oromia Forest and Wildlife Enterprise (OFWE), a branch of the Oromia Region government. OFWE has eight branch offices, and its Bale Forest Enterprise has managed the forest outside the park since 2009. Forests are managed in partnership with local communities. The national park was inscribed on the UNESCO World Heritage List on September 18, 2023.

Historically the forest was thinly populated. Many people have migrated to and settled in Harenna Forest in recent decades. Migration into Harena Buluk woreda began in earnest in the mid-1990s, and the woreda's population grew from just under 32,000 before 1996 to 94,051 in 2007. Migration later slowed as available land became scarce. Residents and migrants converted forest glades and forest edges to farmland, mostly after 2000. Comparison of Landsat satellite images from 1986 and 2006 found a reduction in forest area, particularly in the high-elevation ericaceous belt, with most of the former forest area converted to grassland and pasture by regular burning. Agricultural land is concentrated at lower elevations, along the forest–savanna transition. Satellite data also show forest loss along roads and stream valleys between 2000 and 2019. Common causes are charcoal production, firewood collection, and clearing for agriculture.

The Ethiopian government has designated several areas of the forest as national forest priority areas, including Mena-Angetu National Forest Priority Area, which wraps around Bale National Park on the southeast, south, and southwest, and Harena-Kokosa National Forest Priority Area, west of Bale National Park and north of Mena-Angetu.

== See also ==
- List of protected areas of Ethiopia
- Wildlife of Ethiopia
