= Dinsho =

- Location within Ethiopia
- Coordinates: 7°05′N 39°45′E
- Country: Ethiopia
- Region: Oromia
- Zone: Bale Zone
- Elevation: 1,636 m (5,367 ft)

Population (2005)
  - Total: 3,609
- Time zone: UTC+3 (EAT)

Dinsho (also called Gurie) is a village in south-central Ethiopia. Located in the Bale Zone of the Oromia Region in the heart of the Bale Mountains, this village has a latitude and longitude of 7°05′N 39°45′E and an elevation of 3,207 meters. It is the administrative center of Dinsho woreda.

== Overview ==
Dinsho originally was a small village situated to the west of its current site; Fiona Flintan was shown the solitary, aged eucalyptus tree that marked the marketplace of the original site. The village was moved in 1934 EC (AD 1941/2) adjacent to the main road running between Goba and Shashamane, and by 2000 the town had expanded considerably with the construction of approximately 60 houses around a new market site on the north side of the town. In her 2000 visit, Flintan found that the commercial and retail activities of Dinso consisted largely of houses, shops, ‘hotels’ and tea houses. She found the shops were "poorly stocked with few tinned and some dried goods such as spaghetti and plain biscuits." The principal tourism services was the Wolf’s Den Café which offers trekking facilities including the hiring of guides and horses.

A Town Forum was established in AD 1991 and a Town Office five years later; Ibrahim Jundaa was elected Town Chairman in 1991, who was still Chairman when Flintan visited in 2000. Dinsho has both a primary and a secondary school; the former was rebuilt in the late 1990s and the latter built around 1970. A new health clinic was built around 1996, replacing the old one which had become dilapidated. There are two diesel-powered mills in the town for grinding barley. In 2000, Dinsho had two market days: a small local one on Saturdays and a larger one on Tuesday which draws people from villages around the town, as far as 25 kilometers away; these markets are held in different open places. A mosque had been built in the middle of town shortly before Flintan's village to serve the needs of the Moslem majority, while an older Christian church was "tucked away behind trees and the river."

The Scandinavian style lodge built in the early 1990s, which replaced the previous guest house, built by a Belgian sheep herder, which had burned down in November, 1982. There is intermittent electricity to the town.

The headquarters of Bale Mountains National Park is situated a few kilometers outside of Dinsho. The town was also the main base for the Ethiopian wolf conservation project for many years, and some wolves can be found nearby.

== Demographics ==
Based on figures from the Central Statistical Agency in 2005, Dinsho has an estimated total population of 3,609 of whom 1,772 were males and 1,837 were females. The 1994 national census reported this town had a total population of 2,019 of whom 961 were males and 1,058 were females.
