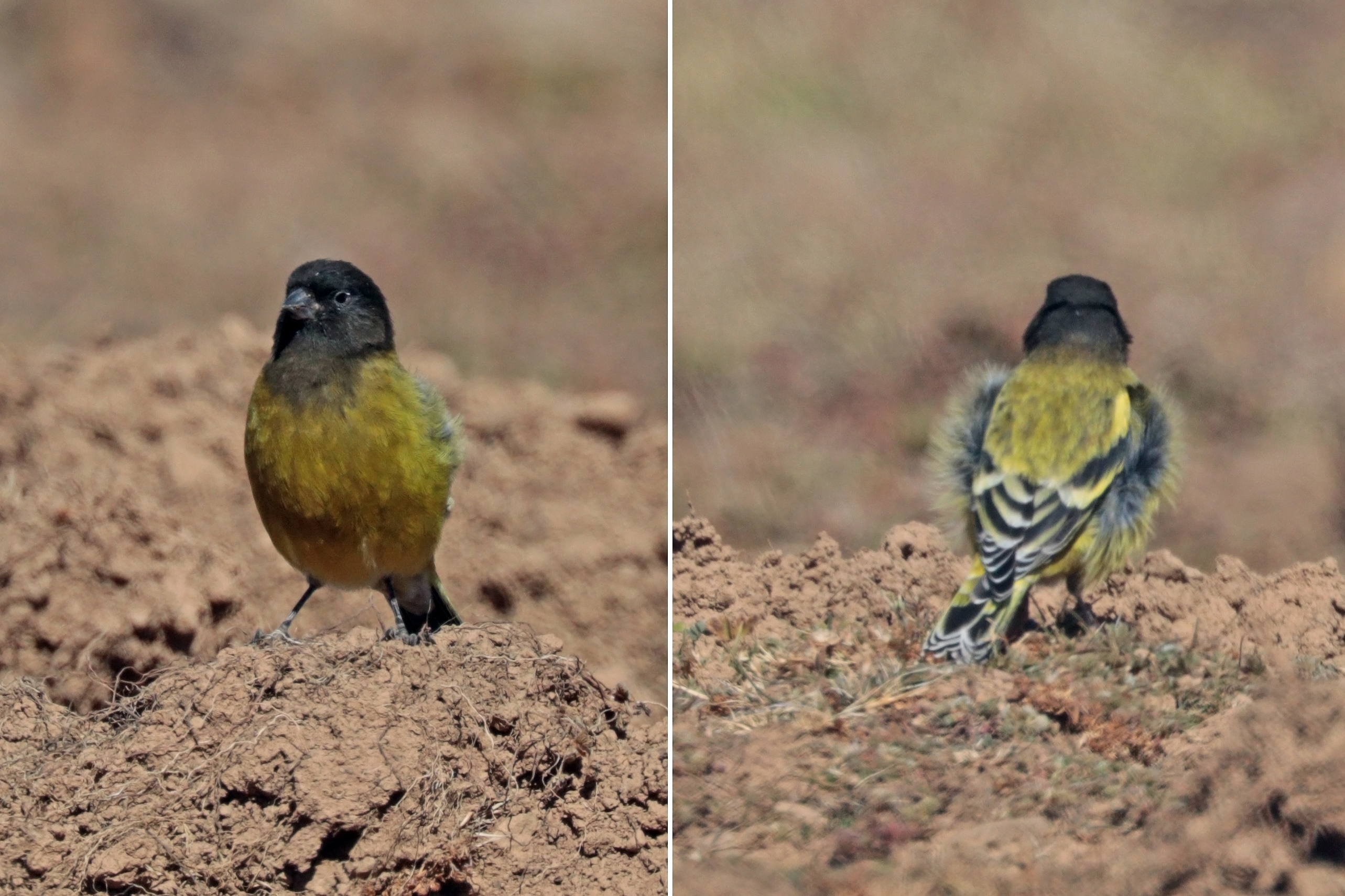
- Male (composite image); Sanetti Plateau, Bale Mountains Ethiopia

Conservation status
- Least Concern (IUCN 3.1)

Scientific classification
- Kingdom: Animalia
- Phylum: Chordata
- Class: Aves
- Order: Passeriformes
- Family: Fringillidae
- Subfamily: Carduelinae
- Genus: Serinus
- Species: S. nigriceps

Binomial name
- Serinus nigriceps Rüppell, 1840

= Ethiopian siskin =

Species of bird

The Ethiopian siskin or Abyssinian siskin (Serinus nigriceps) is a species of finch in the family Fringillidae.

It is found only in Ethiopia, usually at altitudes above 2,000 metres (6,600 ft) in the Ethiopian Highlands.

The bird's natural habitat is subtropical or tropical high-altitude Afromontane grassland.
