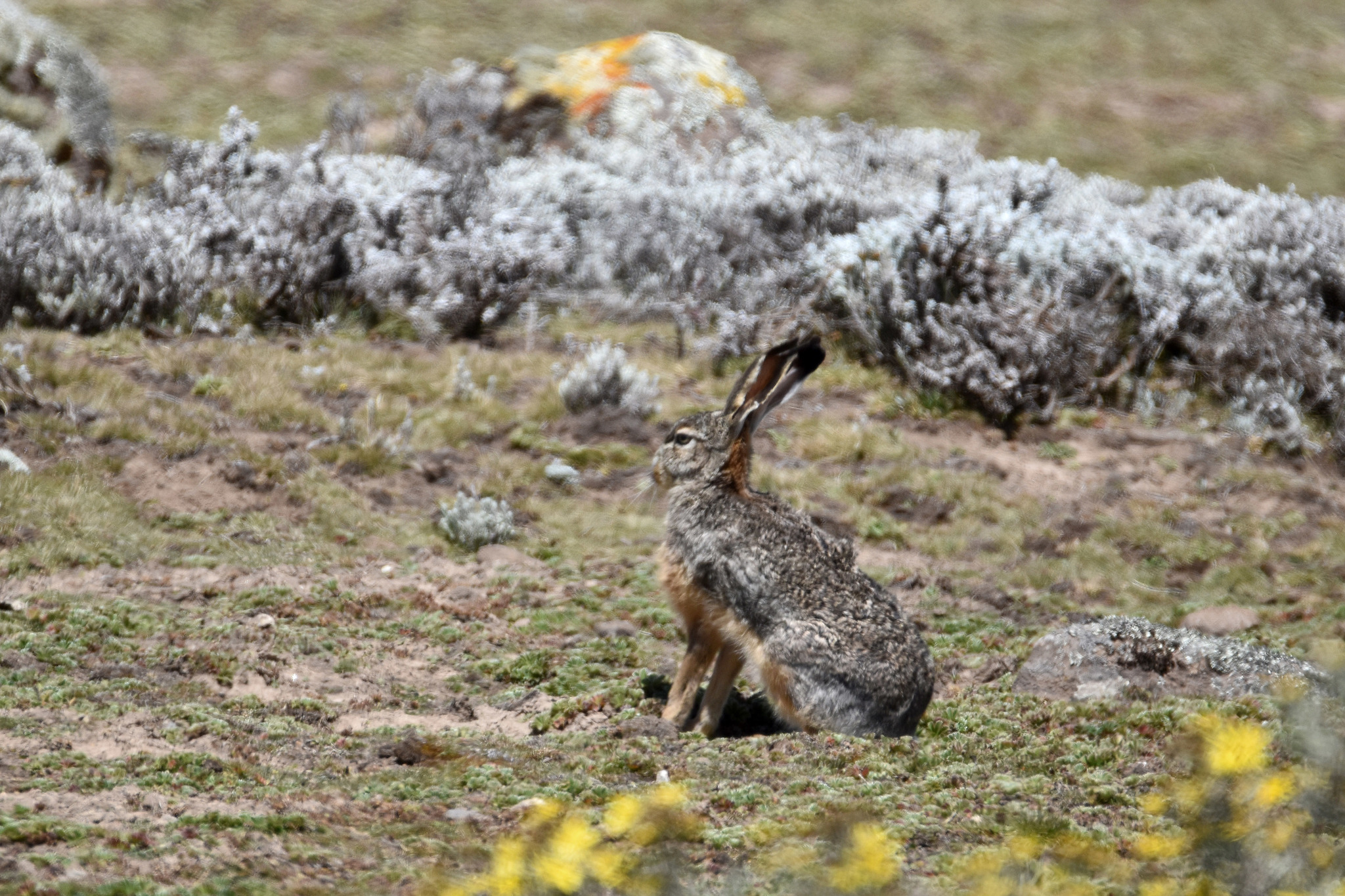

Conservation status
- Least Concern (IUCN 3.1)

Scientific classification
- Kingdom: Animalia
- Phylum: Chordata
- Class: Mammalia
- Order: Lagomorpha
- Family: Leporidae
- Genus: Lepus
- Species: L. starcki

Binomial name
- Lepus starcki Petter, 1963
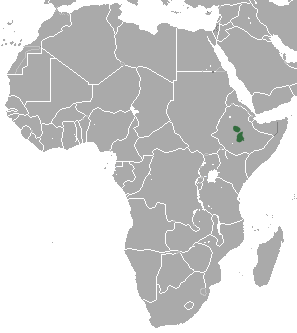
- Ethiopian highland hare range

= Ethiopian highland hare =

Species of mammal

The Ethiopian highland hare (Lepus starcki) or Starck's hare is a medium-sized species of mammal in the rabbit and hare family, Leporidae. Its dorsal pelage is grizzled, buff white and spotted and streaked with black, while its belly fur is pure white and fluffy. It is endemic to the Ethiopian Highlands, ranging over the Afroalpine regions of the Shoa, Bale, and Arsi Provinces of Ethiopia. A herbivore, it mostly feeds on moorland grasses. The IUCN rates it as a species of least concern.

== Taxonomy ==
The Ethiopian highland hare was first described by the French zoologist Francis Petter in 1963. It was originally described as a subspecies of the cape hare (Lepus capensis), but was later given a species status by Renate Angermann in 1983. In 1987, Maria Luisa Azzaroli-Puccetti also listed the Ethiopian highland hare as a separate species, although she suggested it to be a primitive form of the European hare (Lepus europaeus), and is closely related to it, due to the similarity of their skulls. She mentioned that after an interglacial period, the retraction of glaciers may have isolated the populations of the European hare on the Ethiopian plateau, which evolved as a different subspecies. Thus, the scientific name she suggested was L. europaeus starcki.

In 2005, R.S. Hoffmann and A.T. Smith, following Angermann, listed the Ethiopian highland hare as a separate species. No subspecies are recognized for the Ethiopian highland hare.

== Description ==
The Ethiopian highland hare is a medium-sized hare, measuring 46 to 60 cm (18 to 24 in) in length, and weighing 2 to 3.5 kg (4.4 to 7.7 lb). The skull is 7.7 to 9.3 cm (3.0 to 3.7 in) long, and the head is mottled tawny, similar to the back, with whitish chin, tawny nape, and cinnamon tinged lips. A few individuals have white eye-rings. It has medium-sized ears measuring 10 to 11.5 cm (3.9 to 4.5 in) in length, with the upper quarter being black, and the outer surface having white fringe hairs at the outer margin, and wide, whitish or buff-colored fringe hairs at the inner margin, except at the tip. In a few hares, the black color of the upper quarter extends along the inner surface's inner margin and along the outer surface's outer margin, reaching up to the base of the ear. It has grizzled, buff white dorsal pelage which is spotted and streaked with black. The dorsal hairs are 20 to 25 mm (0.79 to 0.98 in) long, and have whitish gray bases, with black, wide subterminal bands, white terminal bands, and black tips. The ventral pelage is pure white and fluffy. The flanks have pale gray hairs at the base, with buff or whitish subterminal band, and black or white tips. The lower flanks are cinnamon russet, with white hairs having cinnamon tips. The underparts are white, and the rump is gray. The nuchal patch is bright cinnamon or reddish brown in color, and does not extend to the neck-sides. It has gray or grayish white, dense underfur. It has a 7 to 12 cm (2.8 to 4.7 in) medium-sized tail which is completely white for that occurring in the Shoa Province, and white with a mid-dorsal black stripe for that occurring in the Bale Mountains. The feet are densely padded with brown hairs. The forelimbs are long, pale cinnamon colored. The hindfeet measure 8.8 to 12 cm (3.5 to 4.7 in) in length, and are cinnamon-buff-colored above, and medium brown below. The principal incisors are wide grooved.

The Ethiopian highland hare is similar to the Abyssinian hare (Lepus habessinicus) which has grizzled, silvery gray dorsal pelage and has a narrow, black rim at the tip of the ears. It is also similar to the African savannah hare (Lepus victoriae) which has brown dorsal pelage grizzled with black, and ears having lesser black on tip. Its nuchal patch is brownish-orange to orange, and it has not been observed to occur in the Ethiopian plateau.

== Distribution and habitat ==
The Ethiopian highland hare is endemic to the central Ethiopian Highlands, occurring in the Afroalpine regions of Ethiopia. It occurs on the central plateau of the Shoa Province, and in the mountains of Bale and Arsi Province except in the Great Rift Valley which parts the two provinces. The complete distribution of the Ethiopian highland hare, according to Angermann, falls in between 6° 50' N and 9° 35' N latitudes, and 38° E and to slightly east of 40° E longitudes.

There is very little information about the habitat and ecology of the Ethiopian highland hare, but it is known to inhabit restricted montane moorlands or grasslands, in open highland regions of its distribution. It is found at 2,500 to 4,000 m (8,200 to 13,100 ft) of elevation from the sea level.

The Ethiopian highland hare is sympatric in part of its range with the Abyssinian hare. In afroalpine grasslands of the Sanetti Plateau, its population density is evaluated to be 0.3 individuals per hectare, in Helichrysum scrub of the Tullu Deemtu Mountain (Bale) as 0.2 individuals per hectare, and in the Web Valley grasslands (Bale) as 0.17 individuals per hectare.

== Behavior and ecology ==
The Ethiopian highland hare is a herbivore, and mostly feeds on moorland grasses such as bentgrass (Agrostis), goosegrass (Eleusine), Festuca, fountaingrass (Pennisetum) and bluegrass (Poa). At such altitudes in which the Ethiopian highland hare lives, it is expected to reproduce in dry seasons. The female produces one offspring per breeding season. Not much has been recorded about its reproduction and behavior.

The Ethiopian highland hare is predated by the Ethiopian wolf (Canis simensis) and statistically forms 1.6% of its diet numerically, or 11.6% by weight. The tawny eagle (Aquila rapax) is also a known predator of the Ethiopian highland hare.

== Status and conservation ==
Since 1996, the Ethiopian highland hare is rated as a species of least concern on the IUCN Red List of Endangered Species. This is because, although it has a restricted range in Ethiopia, it is thought to be an abundant species within its distribution. It is recorded as "quite abundant and sufficiently represented in existing protected areas." The current state of its population trend is unclear, but the status has been reported as "relatively numerous" by John E.C. Flux and Angermann in 1990. Its population numbers are reported to be fluctuating. It occurs in the protected area of the Bale Mountains. There are no known threats to the Ethiopian highland hare.
