= Gymnosporia harenensis =

Conservation status
- Vulnerable (IUCN 2.3)

Scientific classification
- Kingdom: Plantae
- Clade: Tracheophytes
- Clade: Angiosperms
- Clade: Eudicots
- Clade: Rosids
- Order: Celastrales
- Family: Celastraceae
- Genus: Gymnosporia
- Species: G. harenensis

Binomial name
- Gymnosporia harenensis (Sebsebe) Jordaan (2006)

Synonyms
- Maytenus harenensis Sebsebe (1989)

Species of tree

Gymnosporia harenensis is a species of plant in the family Celastraceae. It is endemic to the Harenna Forest in southeastern Ethiopia, a remnant Afromontane forest in the Bale Mountains. It is threatened by habitat loss.
