= Ethiopian Highlands =

Mountain range in northern Ethiopia

Coordinates: 10.705775°N 37.849282°E

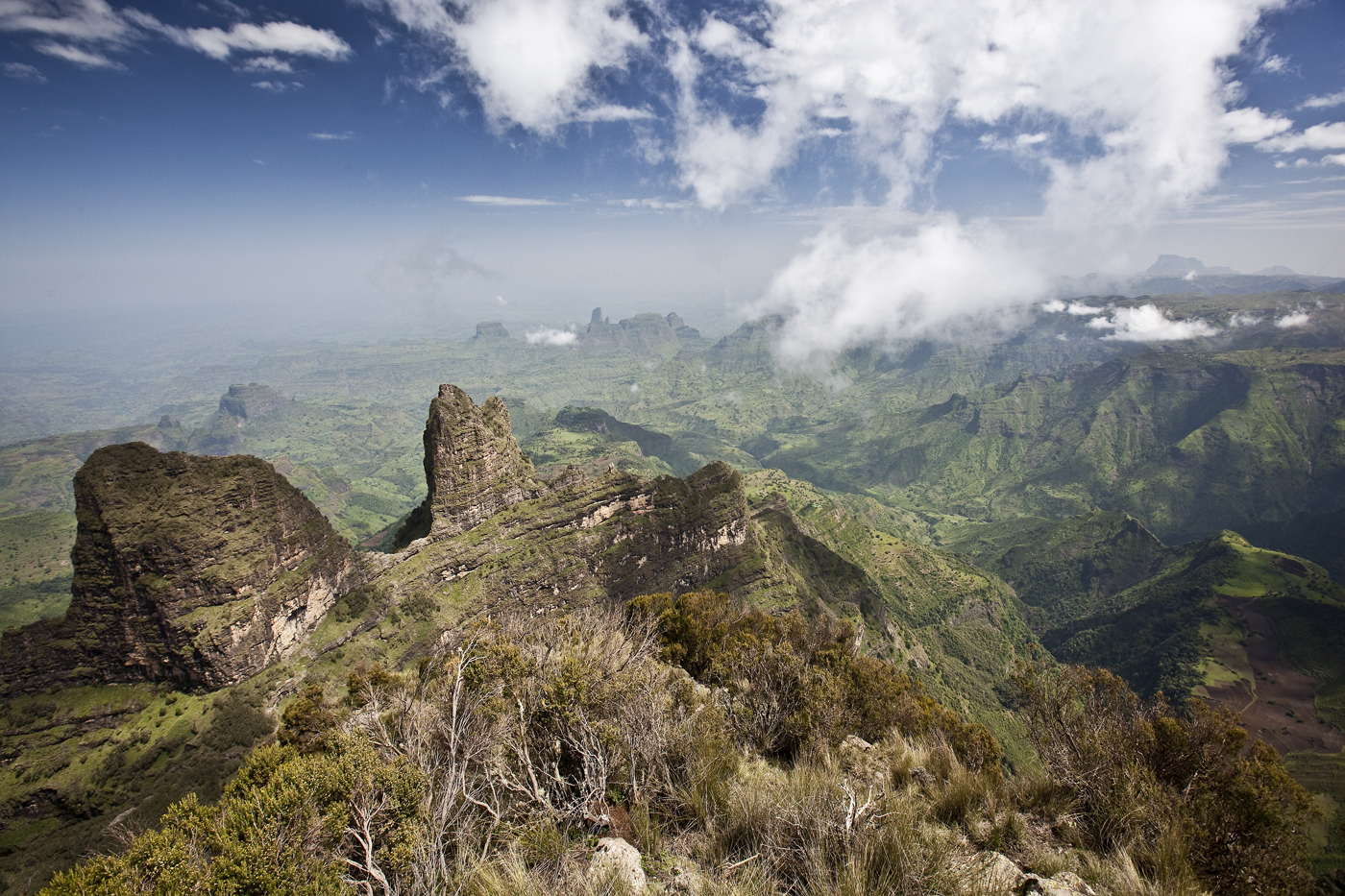
- The Semien Mountains with the tallest peak Ras Dashen in the Ethiopian Highlands are a World Heritage Site and include the Semien Mountains National Park

Highest point
- Elevation: 4,550 m (14,930 ft)

Geography
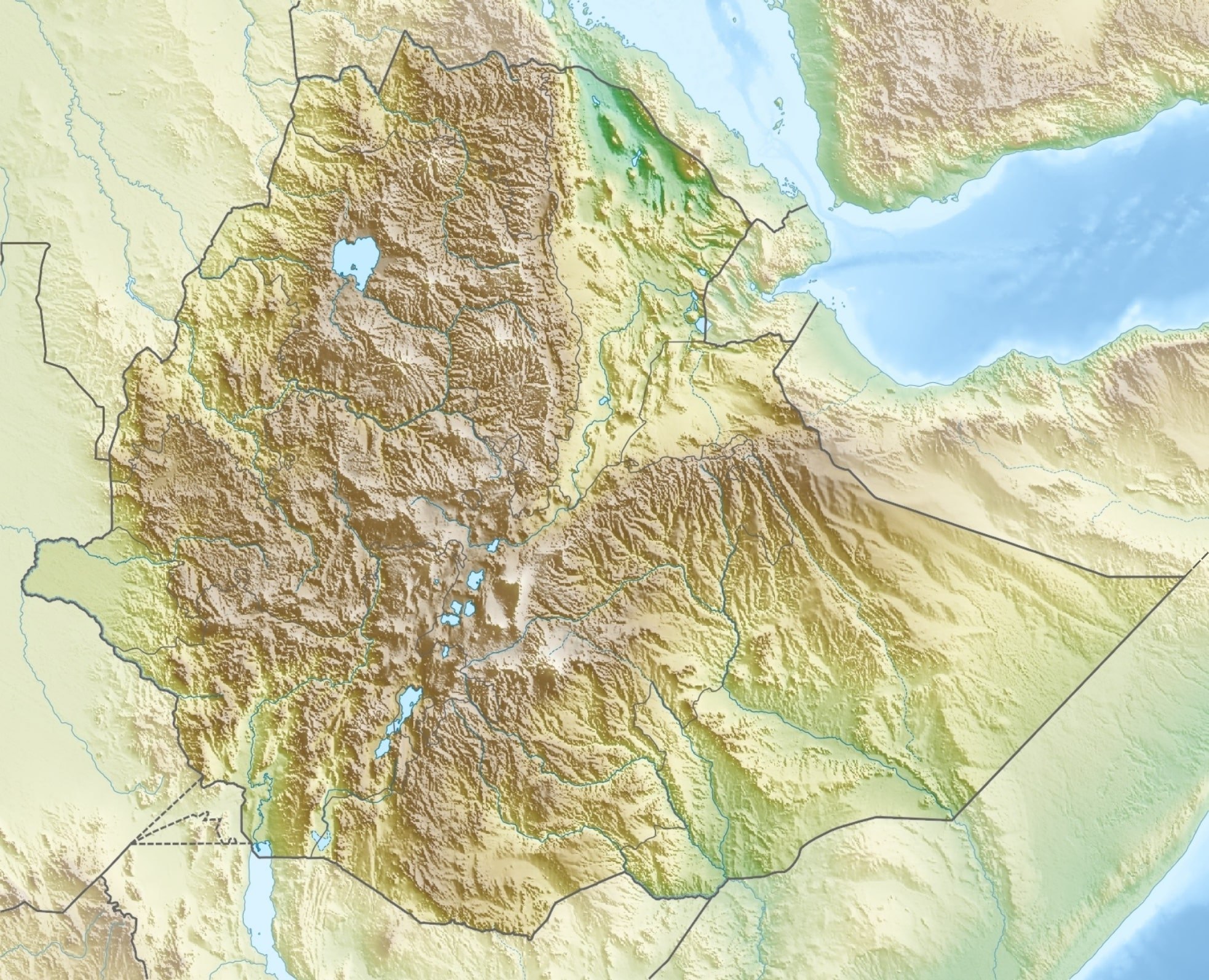
- Topographic map
- Location: Ethiopia - Eritrea

Geology
- Rock age: 75 million years
- Mountain type: Mountain range

The Ethiopian Highlands, also known as the Abyssinian Highlands, is a rugged mass of mountains extending from Ethiopia to Eritrea in Northeast Africa. It forms the largest continuous area of its elevation in the continent, with little of its surface falling below 1,500 m (4,900 ft), while the summits reach heights of up to 4,550 m (14,930 ft). It is sometimes called the "Roof of Africa" due to its height and large area. Ethiopia is the only country in the region with such a high elevated surface. This elevated surface is bisected diagonally by the Great East African Rift System which extends from Syria to Mozambique across the East African Great Lakes. Most of the Ethiopian Highlands are part of central and northern Ethiopia, with the Eritrean Highlands as its northernmost portion. The Ethiopia-Yemen Continental Flood Basalts are shared between the Horn of Africa and highlands of Upper Yemen along with the cultural, historical, and genetic ties of the two regions on opposite sides of the Red Sea.

== History ==
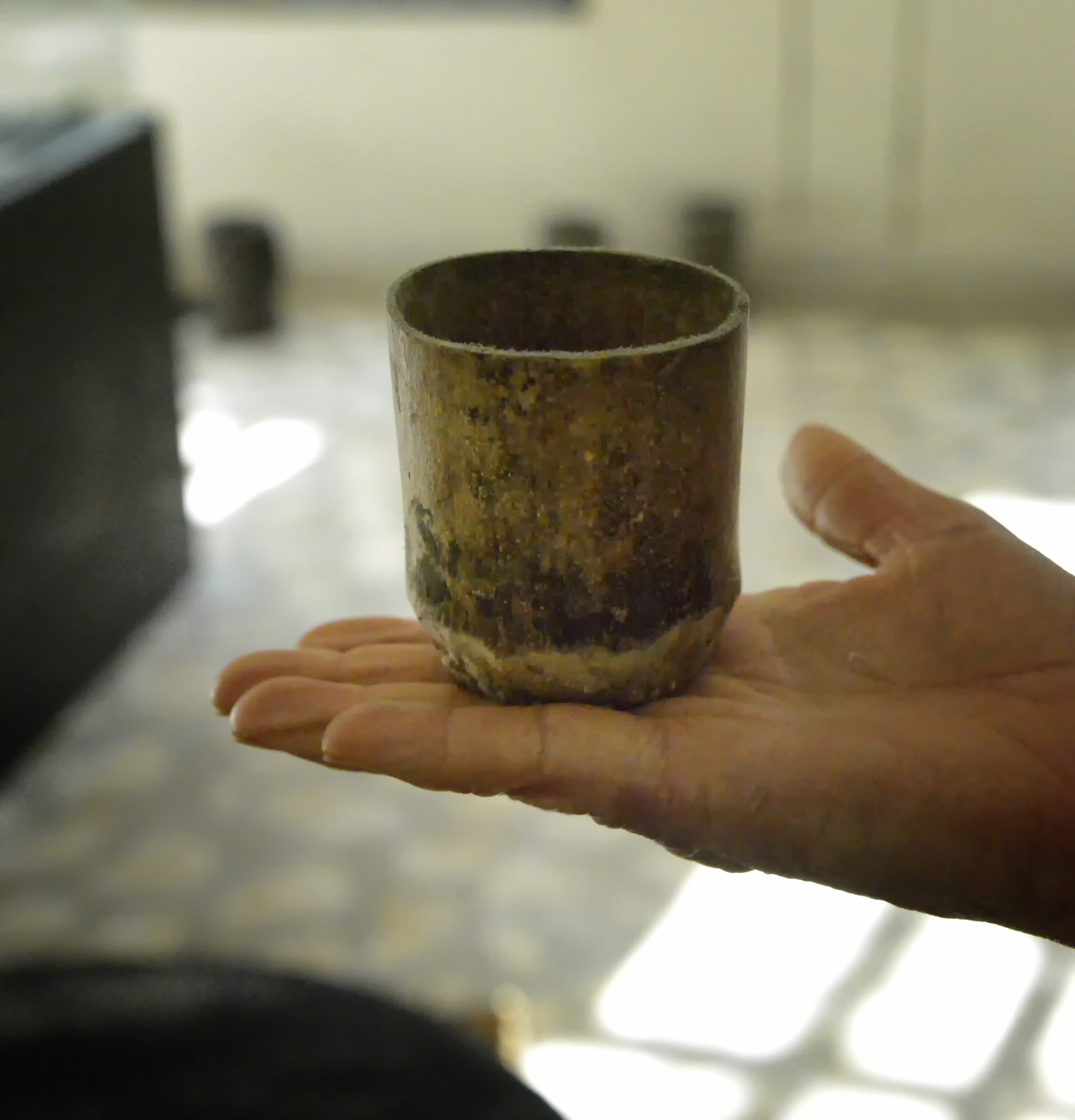
A coffee cup from the era of the Kaffa Kingdom

In the southern parts of the Ethiopian Highlands once was located the Kingdom of Kaffa, a medieval and early modern state, whence the coffee plant was exported to the Arabian Peninsula. The land of the former kingdom is mountainous with stretches of forest. The land is very fertile, capable of three harvests a year. The term coffee derives from the Arabic: قهوة (qahwah) and is traced to Kaffa.

In the Amhara region to the north, genetic adaptation (e.g., rs10803083, an SNP associated with the rate and function of hemoglobin; BHLHE41, a gene associated with circadian rhythm and hypoxia response; EGNL1, a gene strongly associated with oxygen homeostasis in mammals) to hypoxia and low atmospheric pressure has been found among the Amhara people, which may have developed within the past 5000 years.

== Physical geography ==
The Highlands are divided into northwestern and southeastern portions by the Main Ethiopian Rift, which contains a number of salt lakes. The northwestern portion, known as the Abyssinian Massif, includes the Semien Mountains, part of which has been designated the Simien Mountains National Park. Its summit, Ras Dashen (4,550 m), is the highest peak in Ethiopia. Lake Tana, the source of the Blue Nile, also lies in the northwestern portion of the Ethiopian Highlands.

The southeastern portion is known as the Harar Massif. It's bounded in the west, by the fault line of the Rift Valley, in the east, by the Ogaden Lowlands and in the south, by the Elkerie and Borena Lowlands. Its highest peaks are located in the Bale Zone of Ethiopia's Oromia Region. The Bale Mountains, also designated a national park, are nearly as high as those of Semien. It is the main source of the Wabishebelle and Genalle (Juba). The range includes peaks of over 4,000 m. Among the former are Mount Tullu Demtu (4,337 m), which is the second-highest major independent mountain in Ethiopia, and Mount Batu (4,307 m).

Most of the country's major cities are located at elevations of around 2,000–2,500 m (6,600–8,200 ft) above sea level, including Addis Ababa, Ethiopia's capital and largest city, and historic capitals such as Gondar and Axum.

== Geology ==
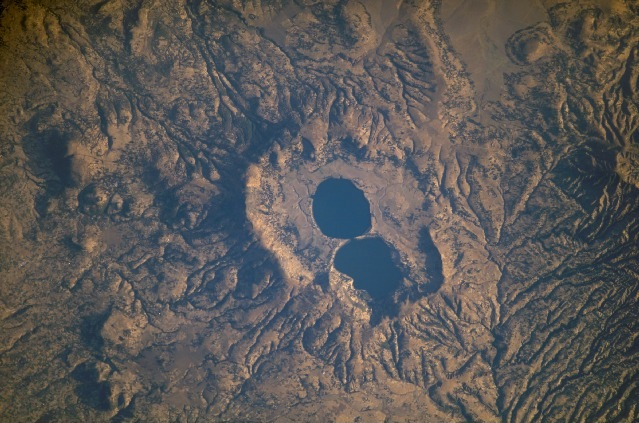
Dendi Caldera, a collapsed volcano in the Mount Dendi region

The Ethiopian Highlands began to rise 75 million years ago, as magma from the Earth's mantle uplifted a broad dome of the ancient rocks of the Arabian-Nubian Shield. The opening of the Great Rift Valley split the dome of the Ethiopian Highlands into three parts; the mountains of the southern Arabian Peninsula are geologically part of the ancient Ethiopian Highlands, separated by the rifting which created the Red Sea and Gulf of Aden and separated Africa from Arabia.

Around 30 million years ago, a flood basalt plateau began to form, piling layers upon layers of voluminous fissure-fed basaltic lava flows. Most of the flows were tholeiitic, save for a thin layer of alkali basalts and minor amounts of felsic (high-silica) volcanic rocks, such as rhyolite. In the waning stages of the flood basalt episode, large explosive caldera-forming eruptions also occurred.

The Ethiopian Highlands were eventually bisected by the Great Rift Valley as the African continental crust pulled apart. This rifting gave rise to large alkaline basalt shield volcanoes beginning about 30–31 million years ago.

The northern Ethiopian Highlands contain four discernible planation surfaces, the oldest one being formed not later than in the Ordovician Period. The youngest surface formed in the Cenozoic, being partly covered by the Ethiopia-Yemen Continental Flood Basalts. Contrary to what has been suggested for much of Africa, planation surfaces in northern Ethiopia do not appear to be pediplains nor etchplains.

== Climate ==
Spatial distribution of temperature in Ethiopia is determined primarily by altitude and latitude. Altitude is the main factor that determines the spatial distribution of temperature in Ethiopia. Ethiopia lies within the tropics, a zone of maximum insolation, where every place has overhead sun twice a year. However, considerable portions of Ethiopia are highland areas, and their altitudes give them non-tropical temperatures. Ethiopia's tropical climate occur in lowlands at the country's peripheries. The predominant climate of the Ethiopian Highlands is the Alpine climate.

Because the highlands elevate Ethiopia, located close to the equator, this has resulted in giving this country an unexpectedly temperate climate. Further, these mountains catch the precipitation of the monsoon winds of the Indian Ocean, resulting in a rainy season that lasts from June until mid-September. These heavy rains cause the Nile to flood in the summer, a phenomenon that puzzled the ancient Greeks, as the summer is the driest season in the Mediterranean climate that they knew.

== Ecology ==
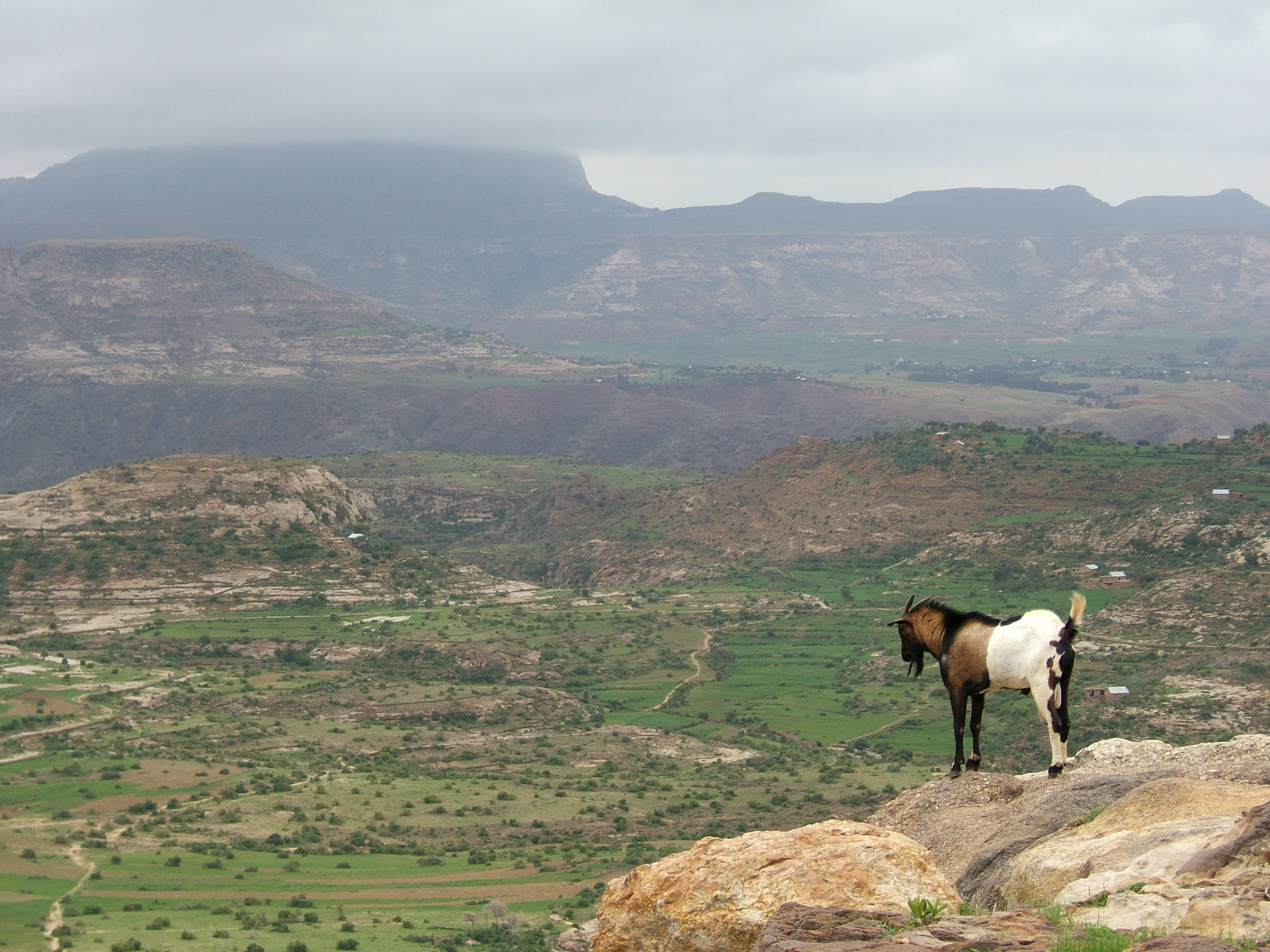
Ethiopian Highlands with Ras Dashen in the background

The Ethiopian Highlands share a similar flora and fauna to other mountainous regions of Africa; this distinctive flora and fauna is known as Afromontane, but from the time of the last ice age the region has been populated with some Eurasian (palearctic) flora. The habitats are somewhat different on either side of the Great Rift Valley which splits the highlands.

At lower elevations, the highlands are surrounded by tropical savannas and grasslands, including the Sahelian acacia savanna to the northwest and the East Sudanian savanna to the west.

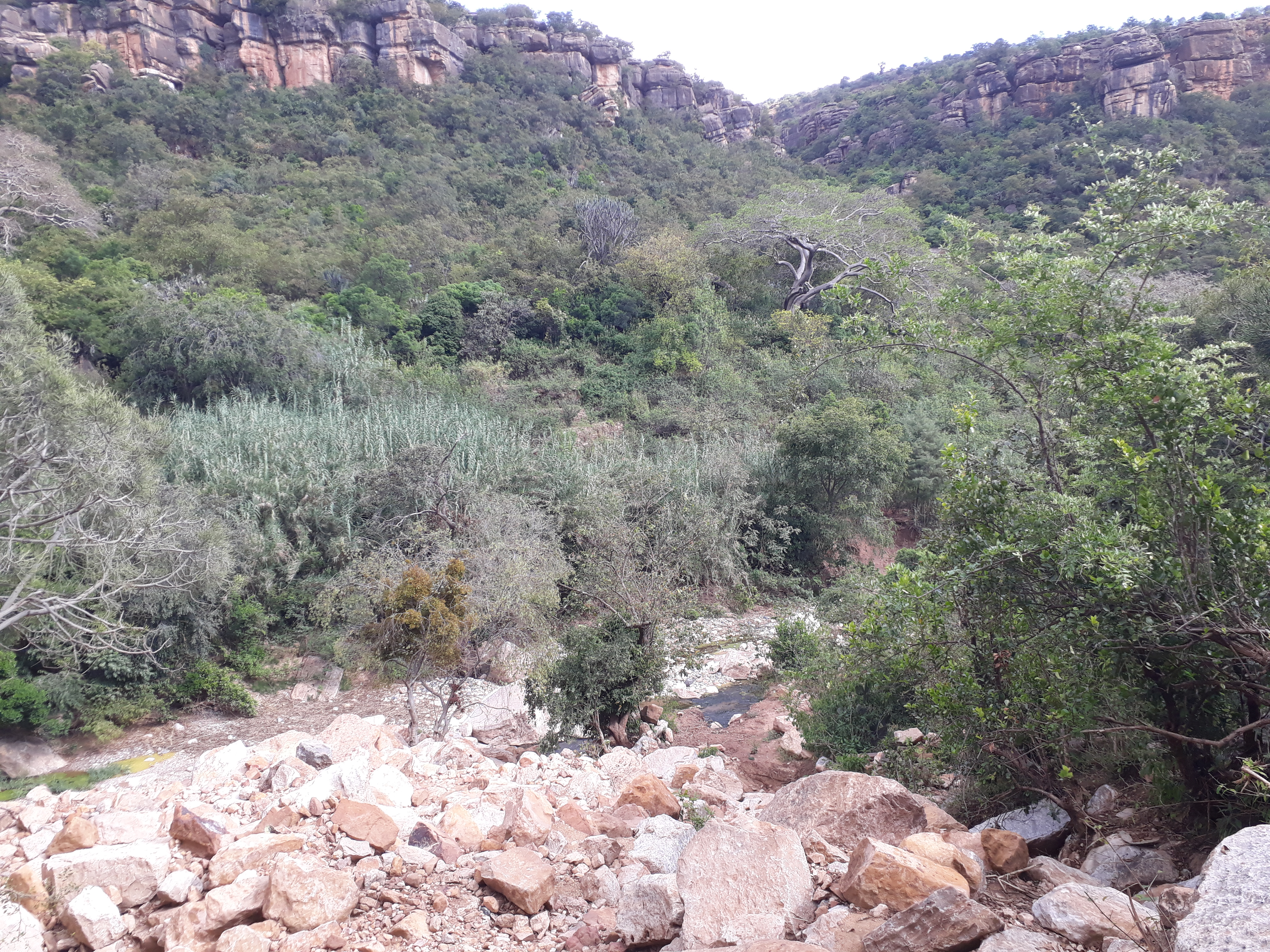
Gestet forest

The highlands themselves are divided into three distinct ecoregions, distinguished by elevation. The Ethiopian montane forests lie between 1,100 and 1,800 meters elevation, above the lowland grasslands and savannas, and extend to areas of similar habitat in Eritrea, Sudan, and Djibouti. This woodland belt has several natural plant communities, but has mostly been heavily grazed and converted to agricultural use now. Kolla is an open woodland found at lower elevations, and is dominated by species of Terminalia, Commiphora, Boswellia, and Acacia. Weyna dega is a woodland found in moister and higher locations, dominated by the conifers Afrocarpus gracilior and Juniperus procera. The lower portion of the Harenna Forest is a distinct woodland community, with an open canopy of Warburgia ugandensis, Croton macrostachyus, Syzygium guineense, and Afrocarpus gracilior, with wild coffee (Coffea arabica) as the dominant understory shrub. The southwesterly winds bring rainfall from May to October with moisture from the Red Sea coming in from the east year round. Fauna at these elevations includes the endemic Harwood's spurfowl (Pternistis harwoodi), Prince Ruspoli's turaco (Tauraco ruspolii) and yellow-throated seedeater (Serinus flavigula)

The Ethiopian montane grasslands and woodlands is the largest of the highland ecoregions, occupying the area between 1,800 and 3,000 meters elevation. The natural vegetation was closed-canopy forest in moister areas, and grassland, bushland, and thicket in drier areas. However these hillsides have good fertile soil and are heavily populated, largely by farming communities, so most of the region has been converted to agriculture with a few areas of natural vegetation remaining. Urban areas in this ecoregion include: Ethiopia's capital city and Africa's fourth largest city Addis Ababa, the Amhara Region capital Bahir Dar with its island monasteries on Lake Tana, the old walled city of Harar, the spa town of Ambo, Asella in the Arsi Zone, the trekking center of Dodola, the lakeside Bishoftu, the largest city in the southwest Jimma, the market town of Nekemte, and the capital of the Tigray Region, Mek'ele. Awash National Park is a site for birdwatching.

Remaining woodland in the drier areas contains much endemic flora and primarily consists of the conifers Afrocarpus falcatus and Juniperus procera, often with the broadleaved Hagenia abyssinica. In the Harenna Forest, pockets of moist, closed-canopy forest with Aningeria and Olea are draped with lianas and epiphytes, while above 2,400 meters, a shrubby zone is home to Hagenia, Astropanax, and giant lobelias (Lobelia gibberroa), species which can be found on the East African mountains further south. The evergreen broadleaved forest of the Semien Mountains, between 2,300 and 2,700 meters elevation, is dominated by Syzygium guineense, Arundinarial, Juniperus procera, and Olea africana.

As the lower slopes of the mountains are so heavily populated, even the high altitude moorlands are affected by human interference, such as the grazing of livestock and even farming. There are two protected areas of high moorland: Bale Mountains National Park in the southern highlands, accessible from Dinsho; and Simien Mountains National Park, accessible from Gondar, which includes Ras Dashen. However, even these parks are losing habitat to livestock grazing, while the lower elevation parks (Harar Wildlife Sanctuary, Awash National Park, Omo National Park, and Nechisar National Park) are even less secure.

Above 3,000 meters elevation lie the high Ethiopian montane moorlands, the largest Afroalpine region in Africa. The montane moorlands lie above the tree line, and consist of grassland and moorland with abundant herbs and some shrubs that have adapted to the high mountain conditions. In Ethiopia, Afroalpine and Sub-Afroalpine vegetations are found in the Highlands of Semein and Highlands of Bale.

== Fauna ==
These slopes are home to a number of endemic wildlife species, including the endangered walia ibex (Capra walie) and the gelada baboon, whose thick fur allows it to thrive in the cooler climates of the mountains. These two species are only found on the northern side of the valley, while another rare endemic species, the mountain nyala (Tragelaphus buxtoni), is restricted to the southern side, and now survives at higher altitudes than its original habitat since the lower slopes are heavily farmed. More widespread mammals found here include the mantled guereza (Colobus guereza), which is also threatened as its habitat disappears as does that of many other mammals of the highlands such as olive baboon (Papio anubis), Egyptian wolf (Canis lupaster), leopard (Panthera pardus), lion (Panthera leo), spotted hyena (Crocuta crocuta), caracal (Caracal caracal), serval (Leptailurus serval), common duiker (Sylvicapra grimmia), and giant forest hog (Hylochoerus meinertzhageni). Birds include Rueppell's chat, the finch Ankober serin (Serinus ankoberensis), white-winged flufftail (Sarothrura ayresi), and blue-winged goose. The farmland is home to many butterflies, especially Papilio, Charaxinae, Pieridae, and Lycaenidae.

There are several endemic animal species, one of which, the Ethiopian wolf (Canis simensis), is critically endangered. Other endemics include the big-headed mole-rat (Tachyoryctes macrocephalus) which is common on the Sanetti Plateau in the Bale Mountains. The mountain nyala finds its way up to the high moorlands although it is more common at lower elevations. Wintering birds include wigeon (Anas penelope), shoveler (Anas clypeata), ruff (Philomachus pugnax), and greenshank (Tringa nebularia).

Other fauna in the area also includes aardvark, eagle, Egyptian wolf, secretarybird, Nubian ibex, and marabou stork and Ethiopian endemic species such as the shrew (Crocidura harenna), the narrow-footed woodland mouse (Grammomys minnae), and Menelik's bushbuck (Tragelaphus scriptus meneliki), which is a subspecies with long, dark fur.

== See also ==
- Geography of Ethiopia
- Wildlife of Ethiopia
- The Great Rift Valley
- Australopithecus
