= Bale Mountains tree frog =

Conservation status
- Critically Endangered (IUCN 3.1)

Scientific classification
- Kingdom: Animalia
- Phylum: Chordata
- Class: Amphibia
- Order: Anura
- Family: Brevicipitidae
- Genus: Balebreviceps; Largen and Drewes, 1989
- Species: B. hillmani

Binomial name
- Balebreviceps hillmani Largen & Drewes, 1989

Species of amphibian

The Bale Mountains tree frog (Balebreviceps hillmani) is a species of frog in the family Brevicipitidae. It is the only species in the monotypic genus Balebreviceps and endemic to the Bale Mountains of Ethiopia. Its natural habitats are tree heath (Erica arborea) woodland near the timberline as well as partly cleared mixed forest further down. Despite its entire range being within the Bale Mountains National Park, it is threatened by habitat loss and deterioration (deforestation) caused by cattle grazing, firewood collection, fencing, and settlement development.

== Description ==
Balebreviceps hillmani is a stout bodied frog. They are most commonly referred to as the Bale Mountains tree frog or the Ethiopian short-headed frog. They have a smooth ventral side, except their throat, while their dorsal side is thick and pitted. The throat of this species is wrinkly. They have short but muscular legs and their toes lack webbing and have a reduced fifth toe. The males lack vocal sacs and the females lack auditory apparatuses, causing them to be unaware of airborne vibrations. A unique feature of this tree frog is their structured palate. They are purple or brown in color with a pair of yellow/golden stripes.

== Geographic range and population ==
The Bale Mountains tree frog is native and endemic to Ethiopia, specifically to Harenna in the Bale Mountains. The current population is continuing to decline since the late 1980s. There is also a decline specifically in the number of mature individuals. The population size is very low and this species is critically endangered.

== Habitat ==
This species is known to live in one woodland, Erica arborea. They are found under logs, boulders, compost, and mosses growing on branches. There has been a continuous decline in the quality of their habitat. Their environment is humid and has a wet season from March until October. The tree frog is normally found above ground, but also fits into small crevices.

== Breeding ==
This species lives an entire terrestrial life cycle. This species is believed to build a terrestrial nest to lay its eggs. The eggs do not undergo an aquatic larval stage, and instead they hatch as smaller versions of the adults.

== Threats ==
The major threats to this species are habitat degradation, deforestation, and human encroachment. The degradation is mainly due to the growing human population, and the deforestation is due to the collection of firewood. The growth in population leads to overgrazing and agricultural development. A fungus, the Chytrid, has been found in this species, but no effects are known. When threatened, this species appears larger to its competition. The frog stretches its limbs, stands raised, and inflates his body with air. Predators and desiccation are minimal threats because the frogs are found at such high elevations and moist environments.

== Conservation actions ==
Their habitat is a protected area and has a conservation program, but lacks management. There needs to be an improvement in management in order to protect the habitats from exploitation. The population should also be monitored since it is a critically endangered species whose population is declining continuously. Climate change and diseases should also be monitored to prevent future problems.
