= Leptopelis ragazzii =

Conservation status
- Vulnerable (IUCN 3.1)

Scientific classification
- Kingdom: Animalia
- Phylum: Chordata
- Class: Amphibia
- Order: Anura
- Family: Arthroleptidae
- Genus: Leptopelis
- Species: L. ragazzii

Binomial name
- Leptopelis ragazzii (Boulenger, 1896)

Synonyms
- Hylambates ragazzii Boulenger, 1896; Leptopelis ragazzii — Largen, 1977

Species of amphibian

Leptopelis ragazzii is a species of frog in the family Arthroleptidae. The species is endemic to the Ethiopian Highlands on both sides of the Great Rift Valley. Common names Ragazzi's tree frog and Shoa forest treefrog have been coined for it. It is named after Vincenzo Ragazzi (1856–1929), from the Modena Natural History Society, who explored and collected in Ethiopia.

== Description ==
Adult males of L. ragazzii measure 28–43 mm (1.1–1.7 in) and adult females 39–50 mm (1.5–2.0 in) in snout–vent length. There are two colour phases. In phase A, the dorsum is pale greenish-yellow, bright green, or dark olive, and typically there are no darker markings. In phase B, the dorsum is cream, pale grey, or greenish to dark red-brown. There is a feeble to very pronounced pattern of grey or green to dark brown or black blotches, spots and freckling. These markings form a more or less discernible triangle or rectangle. A series of irregular blotches is usually present in the sacral region. Limbs have transverse bars that may or may not be well-defined. Few to numerous cream to bright yellow spots may be irregularly scattered over dorsum. There is almost always a distinct pale line above vent and heel. The venter is white or cream and usually has a pattern that range from light, pale grey mottling to being heavily blotched or even completely suffused with dark purplish-brown.

The male advertisement call is a rather sharp "click", sometimes preceded by a low scream or creaking sound.

== Habitat and conservation ==
L. ragazzii lives in montane forest at elevations of 1,900–3,100 m (6,200–10,200 ft) above sea level. It is an arboreal species. It has also been found near human settlements, and it seems to be able to survive in isolated forest remnants and moderately degraded habitats.

== Reproduction ==
The males of L. ragazzii call from low vegetation near streams, although not necessarily particularly close to water, typically perched some 0.25–2 m (9.8 in – 6 ft 6.7 in) above the ground. The eggs are laid in nests on land, near water, and the tadpoles develop in pools and small streams, both permanent and temporary.

== Conservation ==
Habitat loss, caused by forest clearance, human settlement, and encroachment by subsistence agriculture, is a threat to L. ragazzii. It occurs in the Bale Mountains National Park, although this offers limited protection only. Chytrid fungus has been detected in this species, although its impact remains unknown.
