= Mount Tullu Dimtu =

Mountain in Bale Zone, Ethiopia

Tullu Dimtu
- Tulu Dīmtu
- Location within Ethiopia

Highest point
- Elevation: 4,385 m (14,386 ft)
- Prominence: 2,512 m (8,241 ft)
- Listing: Ultra; Ribu
- Coordinates: 6°49′35″N 39°49′10″E

Geography
- Location: Bale Zone, Oromia Region, Ethiopia
- Parent range: Bale Mountains

Tullu Dimtu (Oromo: Tulluu Diimtuu) is the fourth highest peak in Ethiopia after Ras Dashen (4550m), Ancua (4462m), and Kidus Yared (4453m).

Tullu Dimtu is on the Sanetti Plateau in the Bale Mountains of Oromia Region in southeast Ethiopia, within Bale Mountains National Park. It forms part of the divide between the drainage basins of the Weyib and Shebelle Rivers.

A rough gravel road, the third highest in Africa, leads to the top of Tullu Dimtu.

== See also ==
- Bale National Park
