= Robe Airport =

Airport in Ethiopia

- IATA: GOB; ICAO: HAGB

Summary
- Airport type: Public
- Owner: Ethiopian Civil Aviation Authority
- Operator: Ethiopian Airports Enterprise
- Serves: Robe, Goba
- Elevation AMSL: 7,892 ft / 2,405 m
- Coordinates: 7°07′05″N 40°02′45″E

Map
- Location of the airport in Ethiopia

Runways
Direction	Length		Surface
Direction	ft	m	Surface
15/33	7,775	2,370	Paved
- Source: Google Maps

Robe Airport (IATA: GOB, ICAO: HAGB) is a public airport in the town of Bale Robe in Oromia Region of Ethiopia. It also serves the nearby town of Goba.

The airport lies at an elevation of 2,405 m (7,892 ft) above mean sea level.

== Airlines and destinations ==
Airlines	Destinations
Ethiopian Airlines	Addis Ababa
