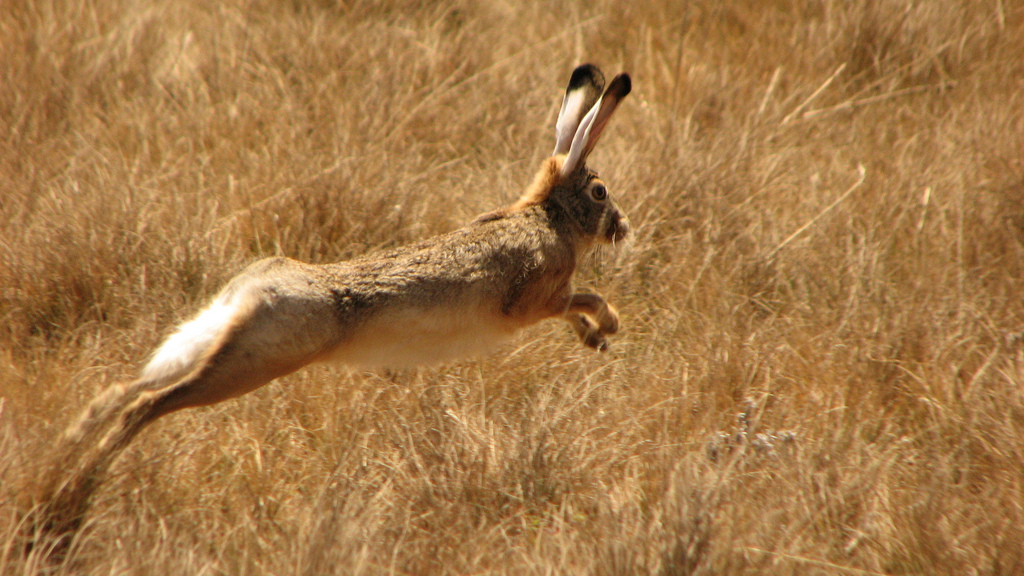
- Guassa Community Conservation Area, Ethiopia

Conservation status
- Least Concern (IUCN 3.1)

Scientific classification
- Kingdom: Animalia
- Phylum: Chordata
- Class: Mammalia
- Order: Lagomorpha
- Family: Leporidae
- Genus: Lepus
- Species: L. habessinicus

Binomial name
- Lepus habessinicus Hemprich & Ehrenberg, 1833
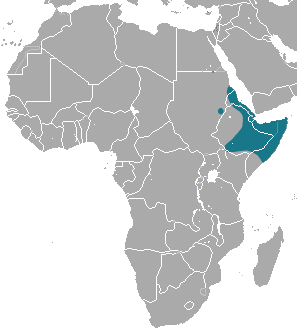
- Abyssinian Hare range

Synonyms
- List: Lepus abyssinicus Lefebvre, 1850; Lepus berberanus von Heuglin, 1861; Lepus somalensis von Heuglin, 1861; Lepus tigrensis Blanford, 1869; Lepus tigriensis von Heuglin, 1877; Lepus somaliensis Lydekker, 1908; Lepus cordeauxi Drake-Brockman, 1911; Lepus crispii Drake-Brockman, 1911

= Abyssinian hare =

Species of mammal

The Abyssinian hare (Lepus habessinicus) is a species of mammal in the family Leporidae. It is a small hare with fur that varies from sandy brown to grey depending on its geographic location, being almost entirely restricted to the nations of the Horn of Africa, though it extends marginally into eastern Sudan and may also occur in far northern Kenya. The Abyssinian hare is similar in appearance to and closely related to the Ethiopian highland hare and was once considered to be a subspecies of the Cape hare. It lives in semi-arid regions, deserts, savannahs, grasslands, and steppes, preferring regions with sparse vegetation that it uses for shade and protection from predators. Little study has been done on the Abyssinian hare's life history, but it is abundant and its range may be expanding, which has led the International Union for Conservation of Nature to classify it as a least-concern species.

== Taxonomy and phylogeny ==
The Abyssinian hare was first described by Wilhelm Hemprich and Christian Gottfried Ehrenberg in 1833. Ehrenberg noted in his account that the hare had been documented many years prior by Hiob Ludolf in his work Historia Aethiopica ('History of Ethiopia'), where it was called tzandjal in Amharic. Ehrenberg also noted the prior work of Henry Salt, who had written about the hare and knew it to be called muntile in the Tigre language, meaning "small hare". The hare's type locality was noted as the "east coast of Abyssinia, near Arkiko."

It has been suggested that the Abyssinian hare should be considered a subspecies of the Cape hare (L. capensis), which was the case until a revision of hare taxonomy was suggested by British zoologist Derek Yalden and colleagues in 1986. As of 2019, it is considered a separate species that is sympatric with (occupies some of the same regions as) the Cape hare. Some authors support the Abyssinian hare's species status by noting that populations in northern Somalia can be distinguished from the Cape hare by their lack of an interparietal bone (a bone at the back of the skull that connects the upper parietal bone to the lower occipital bone), while other authors support it by pointing to differences in mitochondrial DNA sequences between L. habessinicus and L. capensis. The Abyssinian hare's large ears have also been used as a distinguishing point between it and the Cape hare. The Abyssinian hare has no recognized subspecies.

The closest relative to the Abyssinian hare is the Ethiopian highland hare (L. starcki), a very similar-looking hare that shares its habitat, according to a 2017 study of Ethiopian hare DNA. In 2024, a group led by Leandro Iraçabal Nunes found the Abyssinian hare to be closely related to the European hare (L. europaeus), but excluded the Ethiopian highland hare from their results. Like other hares, the Abyssinian hare has a diploid chromosome number of 48.

== Description ==
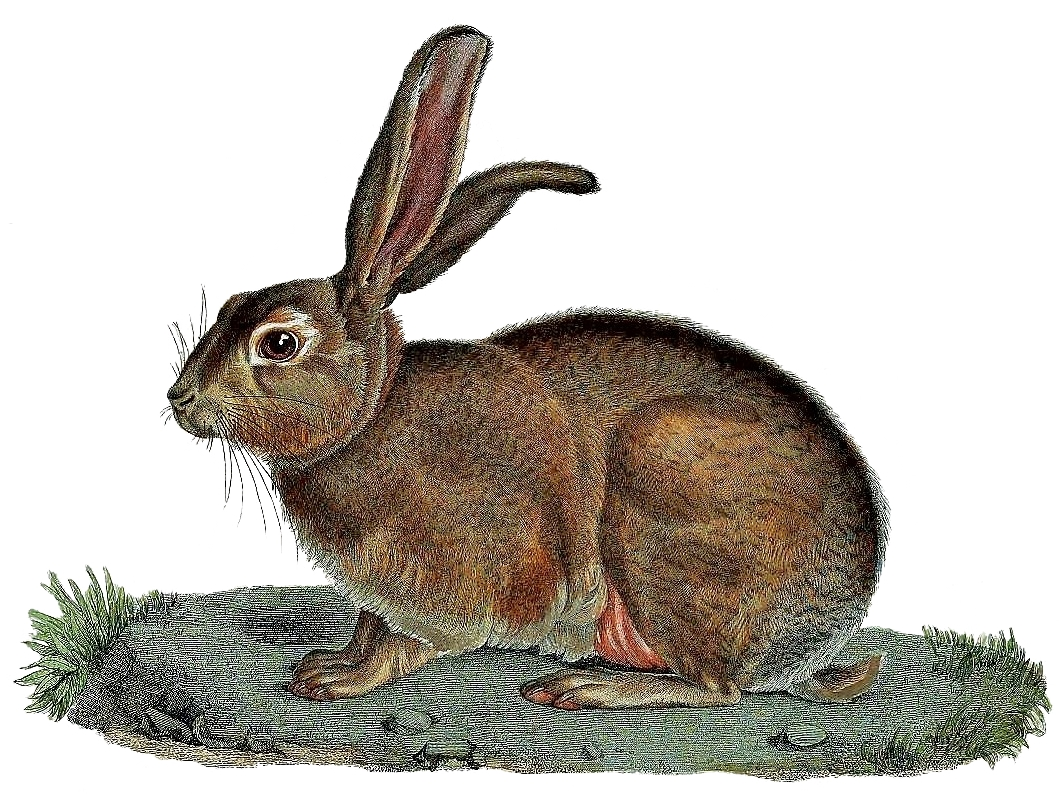
1843 illustration of the Abyssinian hare by French artist Jean-Baptiste Meunier

The Abyssinian hare is a small hare with long, wide ears. Adults weigh roughly between 1.4 and 2.4 kilograms (3.1 and 5.3 lb). Its adult head-and-body length ranges between 40 and 55 cm (16 and 22 in). The fur is soft and dense, and varies in overall colour from sandy brown to grey depending on geographic location, with more grey fur seen in Ethiopia and sandy fur appearing in Eritrea. This variation may allow the hare to camouflage better with varying soil colours. The hare's upper parts are a grizzled silvery grey, with some black on the shoulder, back and rump. The hairs on the back are about 2 cm (0.8 in) long and have greyish-white shafts, then a black band topped by a white or pale buff band, and often a black tip. The flanks are paler, the individual hairs having white shafts. The underparts are white, the fur being less dense than on the back. A thin cinnamon band separates the flanks from the underparts. The chin is whitish, and some individuals have whitish eyerings. The ears are very large, silvery-brown externally and whitish-buff inside. There is a black margin round the tips of the ears and a white fringe round the lower parts of the margin. The tail is 8.5 cm (3.3 in) long, black above and white below. The Abyssinian hare's limbs are notably long, with the hind foot of an adult hare measuring from 10 to 11.8 cm (3.9 to 4.6 in).

Some Abyssinian hares have a separated interparietal bone, a feature common in Cape hares but otherwise uncommon in members of Lepus.

== Distribution and habitat ==
The Abyssinian hare is endemic to the Horn of Africa, being present in Djibouti, Eritrea, Ethiopia, Somalia (excluding the extreme southern regions) and Sudan. Some records point to the species also occurring in the extreme north of Kenya. It occurs in savannah, grassland and steppe, as well as desert and semi-arid conditions where some scrubby vegetation is present to provide cover. It is not present in areas with dense vegetation, where other hare species tend to be more prevalent. The hare can be found at altitudes of about 2,000 m (6,600 ft) throughout much of its range, but may live at even higher elevations in Ethiopia. On the northeastern plateaus of Ethiopia and Eritrea, the hare may be found at elevations up to 2,500 m (8,200 ft). In Djibouti, sightings are very common. It is thought to be spreading further beyond its measured distribution due to the area surrounding its range being overgrazed by domestic animals.

== Ecology and behaviour ==
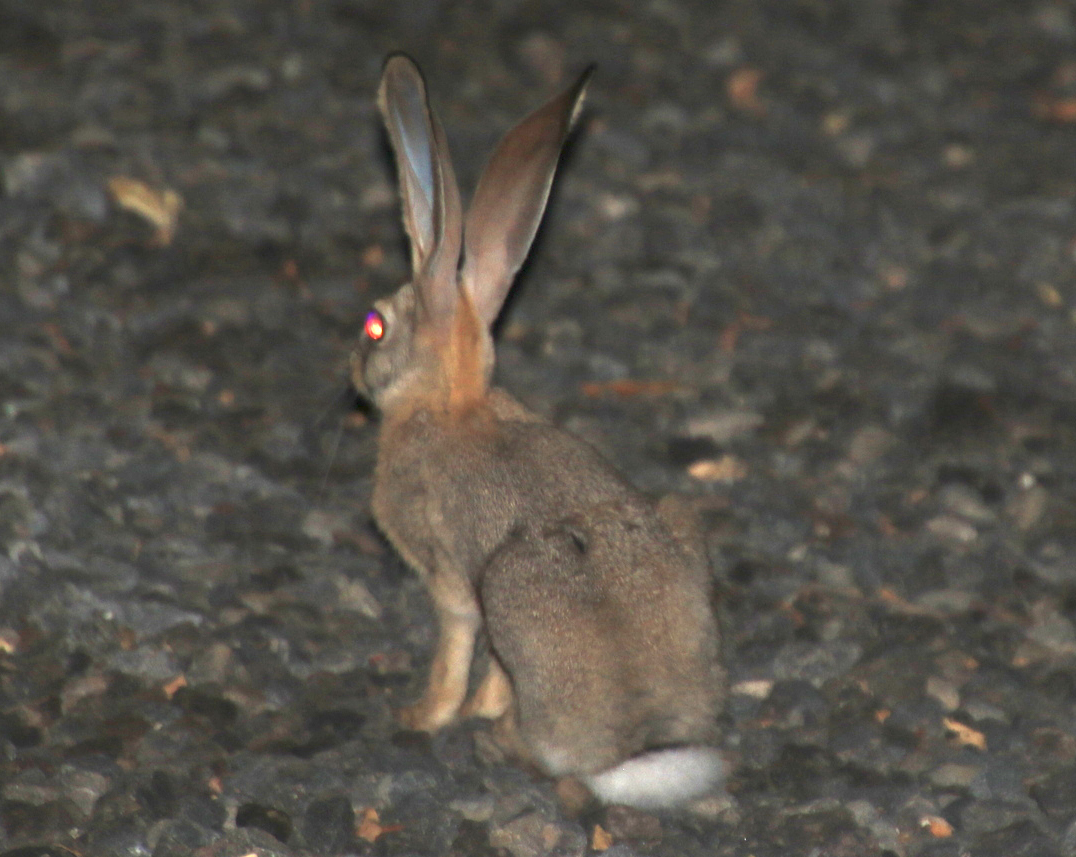
An Abyssinian hare seen from behind

Abyssinian hares are presumed to behave similarly to the nearby Cape hares. They are nocturnal, make use of scrub for shade and protection from predators, and are susceptible to ticks.

== Conservation ==
Little is known about the relative density and sizes of Abyssinian hare populations, though it is considered to be an "abundant" throughout its range as evaluated by John E.C. Flux and Renate Angermann in 1990. It is found in some protected areas, including Awash National Park and Mago National Park, and may occur in Yangudi Rassa National Park as well. Threats to the species are largely unknown, but subsistence hunting is suspected to occur. The International Union for Conservation of Nature considers the Abyssinian hare to be a least-concern species, but advises that additional research on its distribution and the status of its populations is needed. A 2018 account of the species by Zelalem Gebremariam Tolesa, researcher at Addis Ababa University, stresses the lack of available information on the Abyssinian hare's reproduction, diseases, and ecology and recommends research be directed in these areas as well.
