= Mount Batu =

Mountain in Ethiopia

- Location within Ethiopia

Highest point
- Elevation: 4,307 m (14,131 ft)
- Coordinates: 6°40′N 39°25′E

Geography
- Location: Bale Zone, Oromia Region, Ethiopia

Mount Batu is one of the highest of the Bale Mountains of Ethiopia, as well as of the Oromia Region. Part of the Bale National Park, and located at 06°40′N 39°25′E, it reaches an elevation of 4,307 meters. It consists of two peaks, Tinnish Batu ("Little Batu"), which is actually higher than Tilliq Batu ("Big Batu") to the south. The reason for these deceptive names is explained by Paul Henze, who reports that upon viewing them, "it appeared that the peak behind Tinnish Batu was definitely higher."

The first European to climb Mount Batu was the Finnish professor Helmer Smeds, who accomplished this feat in 1958.
