= Bale Mountains National Park =

National park in Oromia Region, Ethiopia

- IUCN category II (national park)
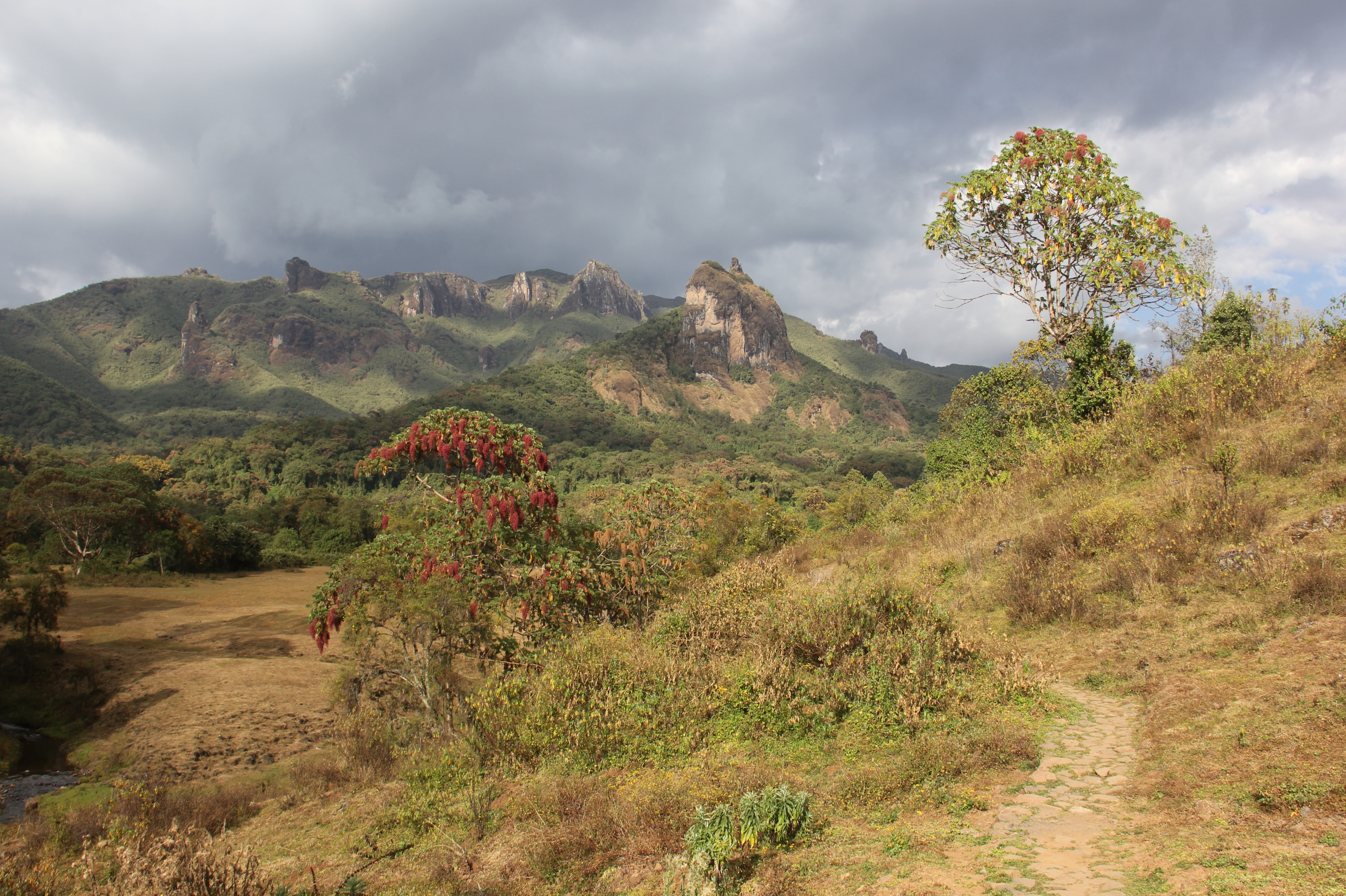
- Bale Mountains and trail in the park

- Location within Ethiopia
- Location: Bale Zone, Oromia, Ethiopia
- Nearest city: Shashamane, Bale Robe, Adama
- Coordinates: 6°40′N 39°40′E
- Area: 2,220 km^{2} (860 sq mi)
- Established: 1970
- Governing body: Ethiopian Wildlife Conservation Authority

UNESCO World Heritage Site
- Criteria: Natural: vii, x
- Reference: 111
- Inscription: 2023 (45th Session)

Bale Mountains National Park is a national park in Ethiopia. The park encompasses an area of about 2,150 km^{2} (830 sq mi) in the Bale Mountains and Sanetti Plateau of the Ethiopian Highlands.

The park's Afromontane habitats have one of the highest incidences of animal endemism of any terrestrial habitat in the world. The park was nominated to the UNESCO tentative list of World Heritage sites in 2009, and inscribed on the List of World Heritage Sites in Ethiopia in 2023.

== Geography ==
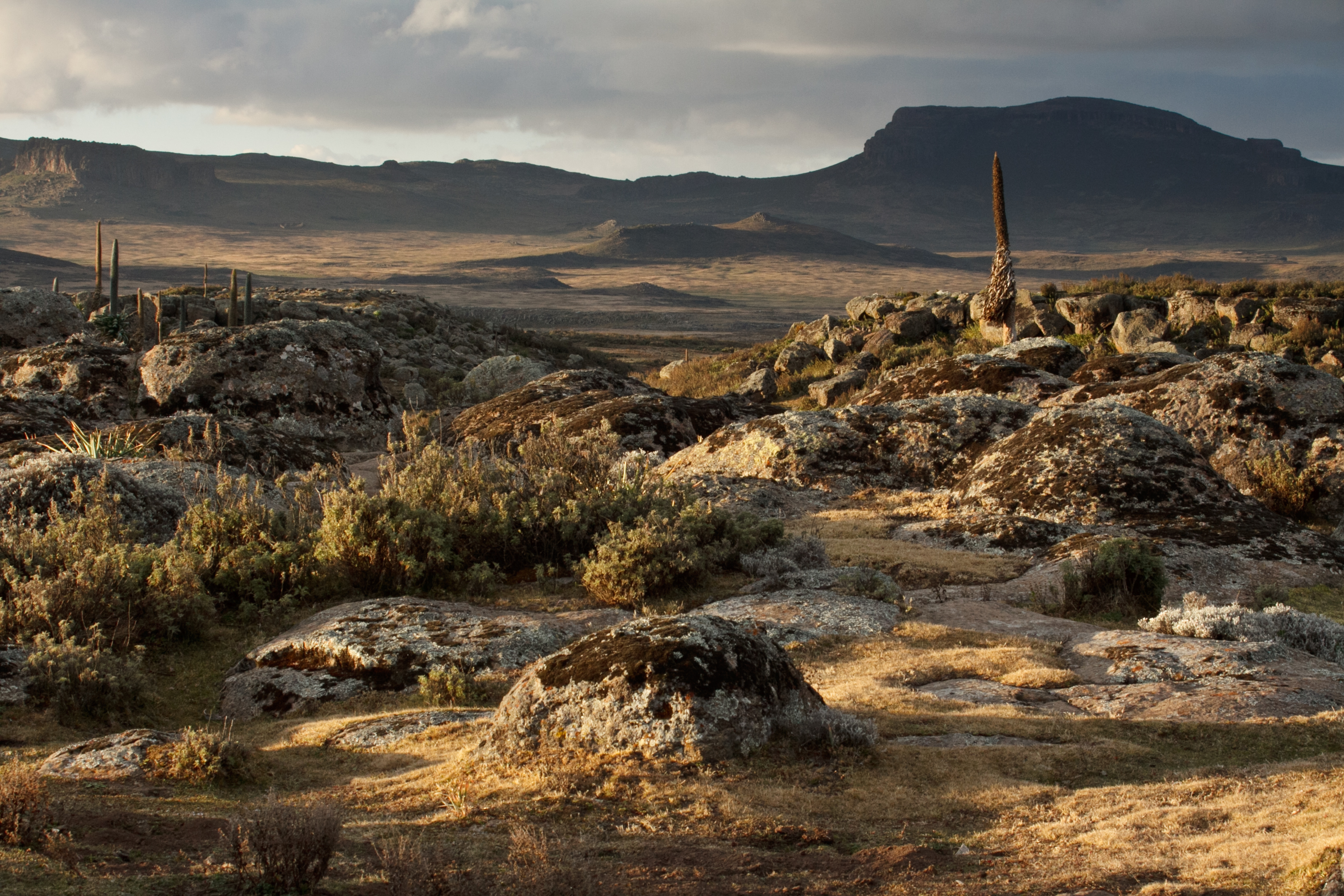
Bale Mountains and park landscape

Bale Mountains National Park covers an area of 215,000 ha (530,000 acres) in the Bale Zone of the Oromia Region of southeastern Ethiopia, roughly 400 km (250 mi) southeast of Addis Ababa and 150 km (93 mi) east of Shashamane.

The park contains Africa’s largest area of Afromontane habitat, with numerous glacial lakes. Much of the park is situated at more than 3,000 m (9,800 ft) above sea level, and its highest point is the summit of Mount Tullu Dimtu, at 4,385 m (14,386 ft). The landscape is characterized by Ethiopian montane forests (such as the Harenna Forest), which transition to the Ethiopian montane grasslands and woodlands at middle elevations and to the Ethiopian montane moorlands at the highest elevations.

== Climate ==
Temperatures vary widely throughout Bale Mountains National Park: on the plateau, daytime temperatures hover around 5 °C (41 °F), with strong winds; in the Gaysay Valley average daytime temperatures are around 20 °C (68 °F), and the Harenna Forest is around 25 °C (77 °F). However, the weather changes frequently and sometimes drastically. In elevations over 3,000 m (9,800 ft), night frosts are common. Rain falls most days from May until September.

== Flora ==
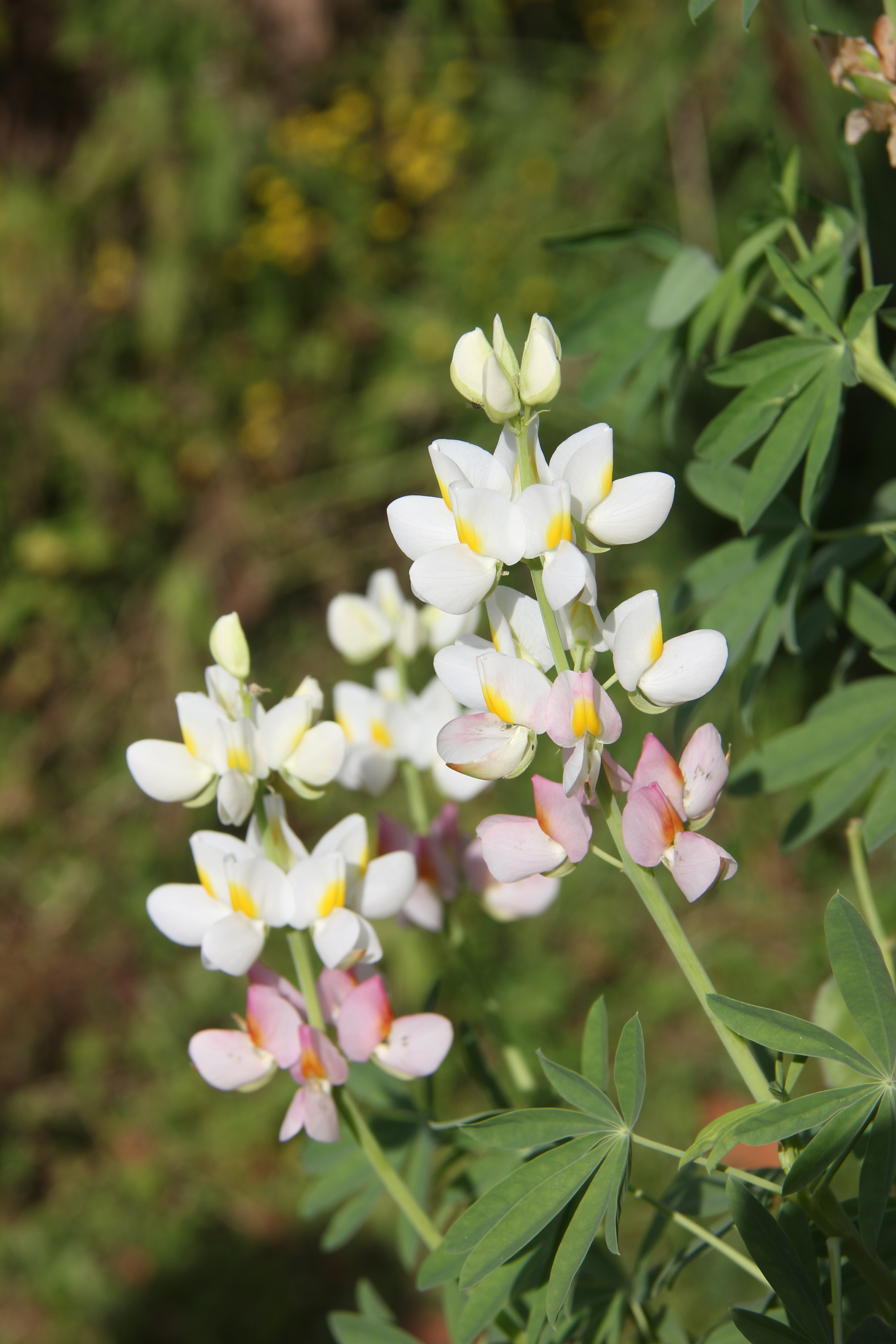
Lupine in Harenna Forest

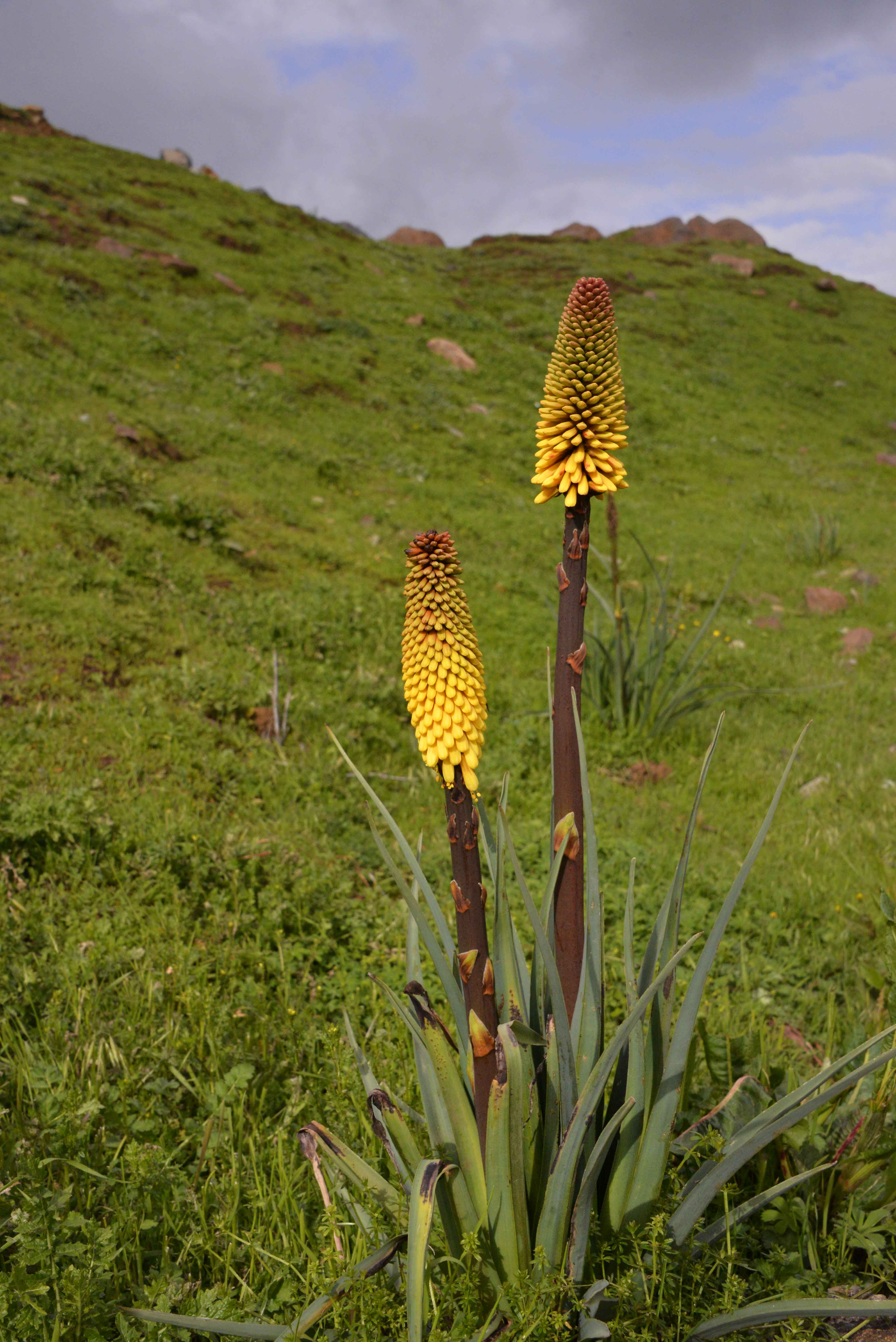
Kniphofia foliosa in park

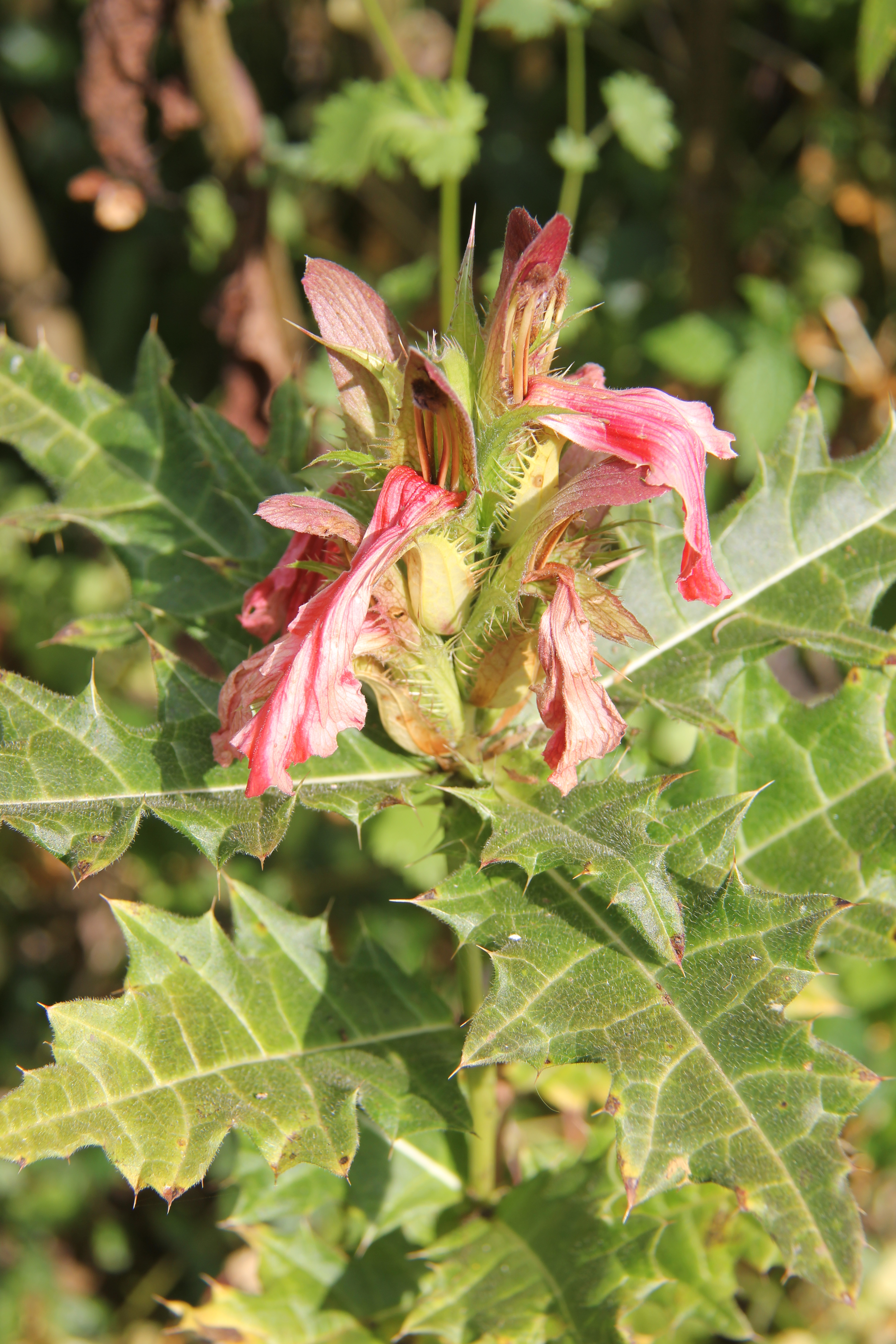
Acanthus sennii in Harenna Forest

Wild forest coffee (Coffea arabica) and several medicinal plants can be found in the forests of the Bale Mountains. Three medicinal plant hotspots have been identified: two in the Gaysay area and one in the Angesu area, spanning the park boundary. The female flowers of Hagenia contain an alkaloid that has anthelmintic properties; it has traditionally been used to treat tapeworm infestation in the local population.

== Fauna ==
=== Mammals ===
Mammal species in the Bale Mountains National Park include Ethiopian wolf (Canis simensis), Mountain nyala (Tragelaphus buxtoni), big-headed African mole-rat, Menelik's bushbuck, common duiker, klipspringer, Bohor reedbuck, Ethiopian highland hare, honey badger, warthog, spotted hyena, serval, and the Bale Mountains vervet (Chlorocebus djamdjamensis).

Other mammals of Bale Mountains National Park located in Harenna forest include the African golden wolf, Giant forest hog, Mantled guereza, lion, African leopard, and African wild dog. The rodent community comprises 47 species, which are keystone species in Bale Mountains National Park, particularly on the Afro-alpine plateau.

=== Avifauna ===
The Bale Mountains are home to over 282 species of birds, including nine of the 16 species endemic to Ethiopia. Furthermore, over 170 migratory birds have been recorded within the park. Bale Mountains National Park is home to almost every highland Abyssinian and Ethiopian endemic. With over 863 species of birds recorded, representing approximately 9.5% of the world's bird diversity and 39% of the bird species in Africa, Ethiopia is often considered one of the most avifaunal-rich countries in Africa. Sixteen of Bale's bird species are endemic to Ethiopia, including blue-winged goose (Cyanochen cyanoptera), spot-breasted lapwing (Vanellus melanocephalus), yellow-fronted parrot (Poicephalus flavifrons), Abyssinian longclaw (Macronyx flavicollis), Abyssinian catbird (Parophasma galinieri), Bale parisoma (Parisoma griseiventris), Ethiopian siskin (Serinus nigriceps), fawn-breasted waxbill (Estrilda paludicola), and the Abyssinian owl (Asio abyssinicus).

=== Herpetofauna ===
Ethiopian rare endemic reptiles that are newly discovered in the Bale Mountains forested areas include Ethiopian House snake (Lamprophis erlangeri), Ethiopian mountain adder (Bitis parviocula), Bale two-horned chameleon (Trioceros balebicornutus), Harenna hornless chameleon (Trioceros harennae), Beardless Ethiopian montane chameleon (Trioceros affinis), and Wolfgang Böhme's Ethiopian Chameleon (Trioceros wolfgangboehmei).

At least seven species of endemic Amphibians have been discovered in forested swampy areas and Bale Mountains National park plateaus. Ethiopian burrowing tree frog (Leptopelis gramineus), Erlanger's Grassland frog (Ptychadena erlangeri) and Neumann's Grassland frog (Ptychadena neumanni) are commonly rare within these habitats. However, other amphibians species lives within the areas of Bale Mountains such as Bale Mountain Frog (Ericabatrachus baleensis), Ethiopian banana frog (Afrixalus enseticola), Ragazzi's tree frog (Leptopelis ragazzii), Kouni Valley striped frog (Paracassina kounhiensis), Malcolm's Ethiopian toad (Altiphrynoides malcolmi), Osgood's Ethiopian toad (Altiphrynoides osgoodi), and Bale Mountains tree frog (Balebreviceps hillmani) are considered to be endangered because of habitat loss and deforestation.

== People of Bale ==
The people of the region are predominantly farmers and cattle herders. The population of the entire Bale Zone is approximately 1.5 million. Afan Oromo is the official language of Oromia. It serves as the lingua franca for over 25 million people, although most people in the Bale Mountains also speak some Amharic. American writer Paul B. Henze visited the area in the early 1990s and stated that he encountered a Harari park ranger.

== See also ==
- Bale Mountains topics
- Geography of Oromia
