= Sanetti Plateau =

High plateau in Ethiopia

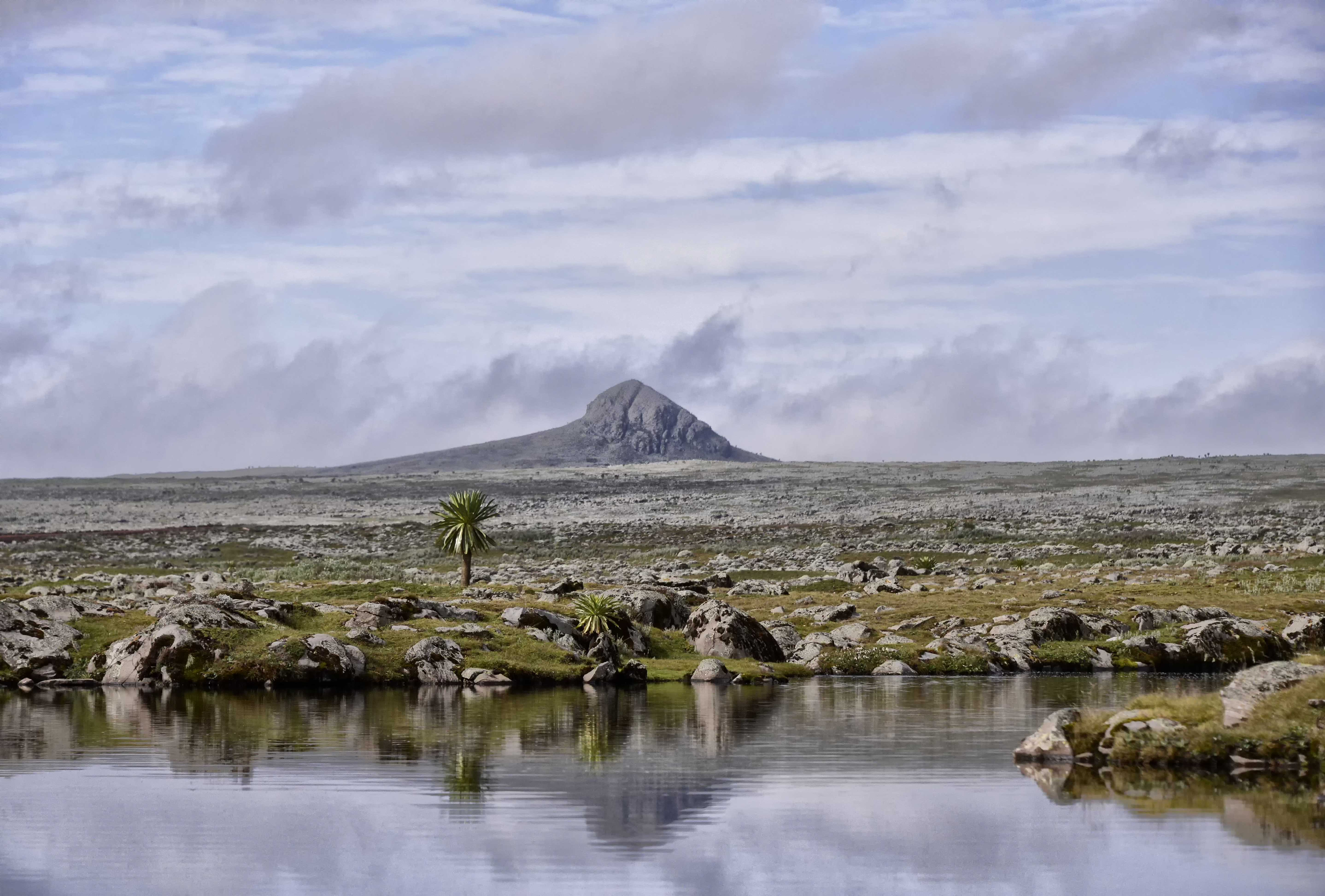
Sanetti Plateau in Ethiopia.

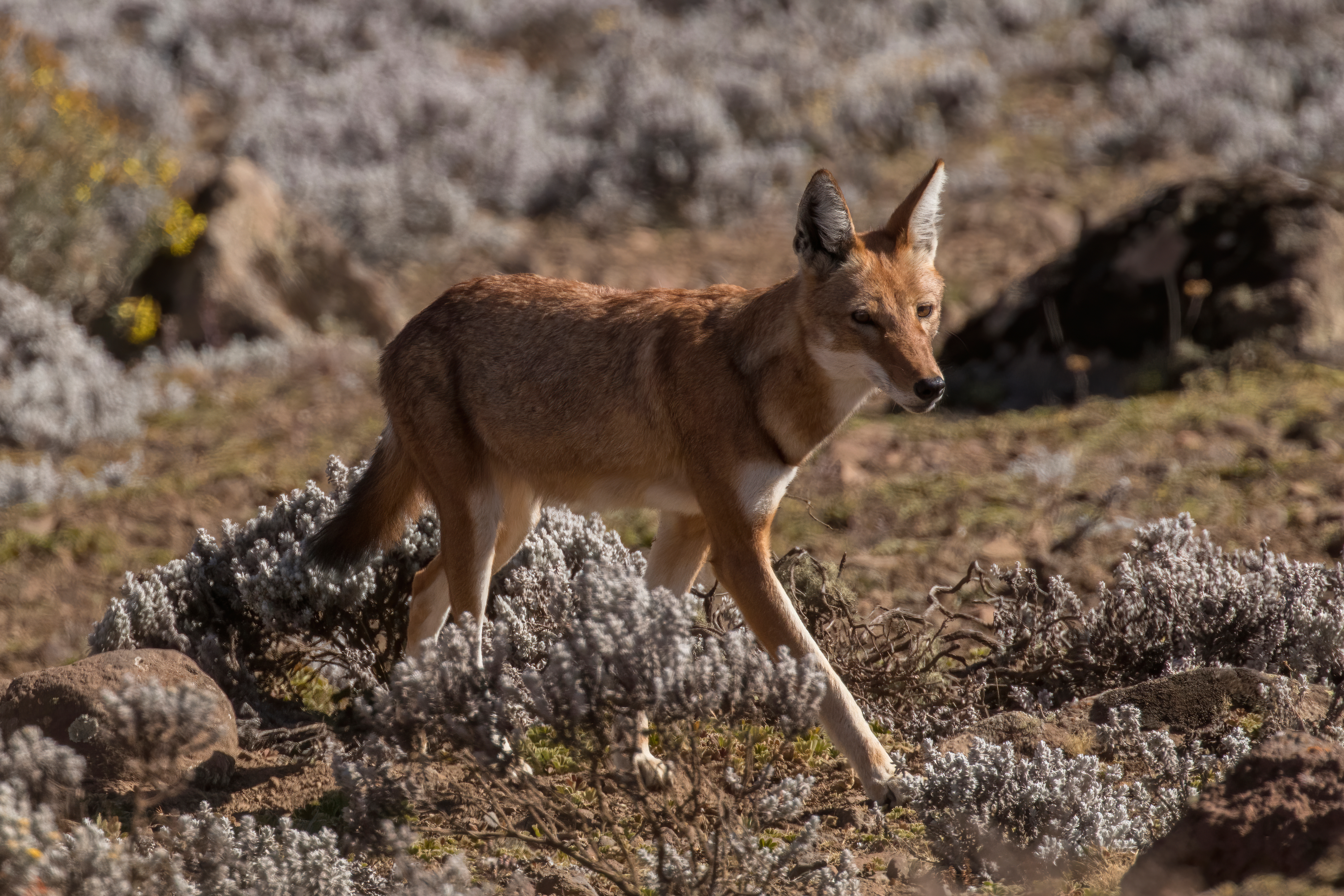
Ethiopian wolf with Helichrysum citrispinum - both are endemic species

The Sanetti Plateau is a major plateau of the Ethiopian Highlands, in the Oromia Region of Ethiopia. The plateau is the highest part of the Bale Mountains, and is located within Bale Mountains National Park.

== Geography ==
The plateau exceeds 4000 meters in elevation, and its highest point is Mount Tullu Dimtu at 4,377 metres (14,360 ft). The southern edge of the plateau forms a steep escarpment, known as the Harenna escarpment, which descends from 3800 to 2800 meters elevation.

The northern slopes drain into the Shebelle River, and the southern slopes are drained by tributaries of the Ganale River, including the Weyib. The southern slopes receive higher rainfall, generally 1000 mm or more annually, while the northern slopes are in the drier rain shadow of the mountains.

== Flora and fauna ==
The highest portion of the plateau, from approximately 3800 to 4377 meters, is covered by Afroalpine vegetation, including Helichrysum shrublands, tussock grasslands with Festuca abyssinica predominant, and groves of the giant lobelia Lobelia rhynchopetalum. A belt of low ericaceous subalpine forest lies below the alpine zone, between 3800 and 3250 meters elevation, and extending up to 4000 meters in sheltered stream valleys. Erica arborea and Erica trimera are the characteristic plants, growing as shrubs or small trees. These alpine and subalpine plant communities are part of the Ethiopian montane moorlands ecoregion, and the plateau is the largest Afroalpine area in the Ethiopian Highlands.

The Harenna Forest covers the southern slope of the Bale Mountains, below 3250 meters elevation. The upper elevations of the forest include extensive groves of bamboo (Yushania alpina) and cloud forest dominated by Hagenia abyssinica. The drier northern slopes include some remnant woodlands of Hagenia abyssinica, African juniper (Juniperus procera), and Hypericum revolutum below 3400 meters elevation. Much of the north slope's original dry woodland has been cleared for agriculture and pasture.

This region is known for its mammals, amphibians and birds including many endemic species. The plateau's afroalpine grasslands and shrublands are home to the largest population of the endangered Ethiopian wolf (Canis simensis). The endangered mountain nyala (Tragelaphus buxtoni) is found in the subalpine and upper montane woodlands. The Bale shrew (Crocidura bottegoides) is found only in the afroalpine grasslands of the plateau and clearings in the adjacent high-mountain forests.

The Sanetti Plateau once was habitat to packs of the endangered painted hunting dog, (Lycaon pictus) but the presence of this canid is now in question here due to the population pressures of expanding human presence.

== See also ==
- Bale Mountains topics
- Geography of Oromia
