= Bale shrew =

Conservation status
- Endangered (IUCN 3.1)

Scientific classification
- Kingdom: Animalia
- Phylum: Chordata
- Class: Mammalia
- Order: Eulipotyphla
- Family: Soricidae
- Genus: Crocidura
- Species: C. bottegoides

Binomial name
- Crocidura bottegoides Hutterer & Yalden, 1990
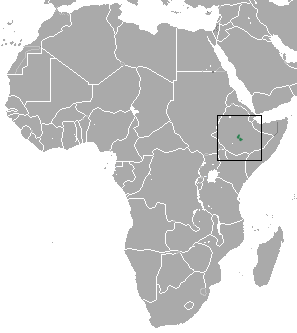
- Bale shrew range

Species of mammal

The Bale shrew (Crocidura bottegoides) is a species of mammal in the family Soricidae. It is endemic to Ethiopia, in the Bale Mountains of the Ethiopian Highlands. Its natural habitats are subtropical or tropical moist montane forests and high-elevation grassland.
