= Bale Zone =

Zone in Oromia Region of Ethiopia

Coordinates: 6°45′N 40°15′E

Map of the regions and zones of Ethiopia

Bale Zone (Oromo: Godina Baalee) is a zone in Oromia Region of Ethiopia. Bale is bordered on the south by the Ganale Dorya River which separates it from Guji Zone, on the west by the Shashamane, on the north by Arsi Zone, on the northeast by the Shebelle River which separates it from West Hararghe Zone and East Hararghe Zone, and on the east by the Somali Region.

== Overview ==
The highest point in the Bale Zone, and also the highest point in Oromia, is Mount Batu (4,307 m) in the Urgoma Mountains range. Other notable peaks of the Urgoma include Mount Tullu Dimtu, Mount Darkeena and Mount Gaysay. Rivers include the Wab and the Waab; notable lakes include Garba Guracha and Hora Orgona. Bale zone is connected with neighboring zones and region by national highway. It is connected with Addis Ababa via Robe highway. The economy of the zone is mainly dominated by agriculture. The zone is for coffee and wheat production. Points of interest in the Zone include Sheikh Hussein—named for the tomb of a Muslim saint—the Bale Mountains National Park, and the Sof Omar Caves. Towns and cities in Bale include Dodola, Ginir, Goba and Robe.

Bale zone is the second largest zone in Oromia National Regional State after Borena zone with a total area of 63,555 km^{2}. It shares about 17.5% of total area of Oromia. It has 18 districts, 2 urban administrative centers, 20 urban kebeles and 351 rural kebeles.

The Central Statistical Agency (CSA) reported that 5,130 metric tons of coffee were produced in this zone in the year ending in 2005, based on inspection records from the Ethiopian Coffee and Tea authority. This represents 4.46% of the Region's output and 2.2% of Ethiopia's total output.

== Demographics ==
Based on the 2007 Census conducted by the CSA, this Zone has a total population of 1,402,492, an increase of 15.16% over the 1994 census, of whom 713,517 are men and 688,975 women; with an area of 43,690.56 square kilometers, Bale has a population density of 32.10. While 166,758 or 26.20% are urban inhabitants, a further 44,610 or 3.18% are pastoralists. A total of 297,081 households were counted in this Zone, which results in an average of 4.72 persons to a household, and 287,188 housing units. The three largest ethnic groups reported were the Oromo (91.2%), the Amhara (5.7%) and the Somali (1.44%); all other ethnic groups made up 1.66% of the population. Afaan Oromo was spoken as a first language by 90.46%, Amharic was spoken by 7.11% and Somali by 1.05%; the remaining 1.38% spoke all other primary languages reported. The majority of the inhabitants were Muslim, with 81.83% of the population having reported they practiced that belief, while 16.94% of the population professed Ethiopian Orthodox Christianity and 1.04% were Protestant.

Bale is named for the former Sultanate of Bale, which was in approximately the same area. The 1994 national census reported a total population for this zone of 1,217,864 in 250,586 households, of whom 603,895 were men and 613,969 women; 130,307 or 10.7% of its population were urban dwellers at the time. The four largest ethnic groups reported in Bale were the Oromo (88.93%), the Amhara (7.65%), the Somali (1.39%), and the Sidama (0.88%); all other ethnic groups made up 1.15% of the population. Oromo was spoken as a first language by 87.5%, 9.5% Amharic, 1.51% spoke Somali, and 0.88% spoke Sidamo; the remaining 0.61% spoke all other primary languages reported. The majority of the inhabitants were Muslim, with 76.7% of the population having reported they practiced that belief, while 19.02% of the population said they professed Ethiopian Orthodox Christianity, 2.77% held traditional beliefs, and 1.15% were Protestant.

According to a May 24, 2004 World Bank memorandum, 11% of the inhabitants of Bale have access to electricity; this zone has a road density of 11.4 kilometers per 1,000 square kilometers (compared to the national average of 30 kilometers); the average rural household has 1 hectare of land (compared to the national average of 1.01 hectare of land and an average of 1.14 for the Oromia Region); and the equivalent of 1.0 head of livestock. 19.5% of the population is in non-farm related jobs, compared to the national average of 25% and a regional average of 24%. Concerning education, 66% of all eligible children are enrolled in primary school and 21% in secondary schools. Concerning health, 53% of the zone is exposed to malaria and none to Tsetse fly. The memorandum gave this zone a drought risk rating of 555.

== Geography ==
Bale Zone is bounded by Genale river to the west and southwest and Wabe Shebele river on east and north. These two rivers restrict surface transportation system intra zone and inter zones and regions. Altitude of Bale zone extends from less than 300 meters around Meda Welabu, southeast of Rayitu and Gura Damole districts; to more than 4377 meters above sea level in Goba district namely Mount Tulu Dimtu. The annual average temperature of Bale zone is 17.5 °C. The maximum and minimum temperature is 25 °C and 10 °C respectively. The mean annual average rainfall is 875mm, whereas maximum 1200mm and 550mm minimum annual rainfall was recorded in the zone.
