= Bale Robe =

Town in Oromia Region, Ethiopia

Bale Robe Roobee Baalee (Oromo)
- Town
- Location within Ethiopia
- Country: Ethiopia
- Region: Oromia
- Zone: Bale
- Time zone: UTC+3 (EAT)
- Climate: Cwb

Robe, also called Bale Robe, is a town in south-central Oromia Region, Ethiopia. Located in the Bale Zone, this town has a latitude and longitude of 7°7′N 40°0′E with an elevation of 2,492 metres (8,176 ft) above sea level.

It is located about 430 kilometres by road from the capital Addis Ababa.

Robe shares Robe Airport (ICAO code HAGB, IATA GOB) with neighboring Goba. Ethiopian Airlines has a scheduled flight four times a week connecting it to the capital Addis Ababa and to the southern city Arba Minch.

The main market day is Thursday, with a smaller market working on Tuesdays and Sundays at another place in the town. Notable tourist attractions include the Sof Omar Caves, which lie to the east.

== Climate ==
Climate data for Bale Robe
Month	Jan	Feb	Mar	Apr	May	Jun	Jul	Aug	Sep	Oct	Nov	Dec	Year
Record high °C (°F)	27.6 (81.7)	30.0 (86.0)	30.0 (86.0)	30.5 (86.9)	31.0 (87.8)	28.9 (84.0)	26.6 (79.9)	26.2 (79.2)	26.6 (79.9)	28.6 (83.5)	26.7 (80.1)	26.8 (80.2)	31.0 (87.8)
Mean daily maximum °C (°F)	23.3 (73.9)	24.3 (75.7)	24.8 (76.6)	24.2 (75.6)	24.4 (75.9)	22.8 (73.0)	20.6 (69.1)	20.6 (69.1)	21.3 (70.3)	22.3 (72.1)	22.6 (72.7)	22.8 (73.0)	22.8 (73.1)
Mean daily minimum °C (°F)	9.0 (48.2)	10.3 (50.5)	11.6 (52.9)	12.0 (53.6)	12.3 (54.1)	11.2 (52.2)	11.3 (52.3)	11.2 (52.2)	11.0 (51.8)	9.9 (49.8)	8.7 (47.7)	8.1 (46.6)	10.6 (51.0)
Record low °C (°F)	2.7 (36.9)	3.8 (38.8)	5.0 (41.0)	8.4 (47.1)	8.6 (47.5)	8.6 (47.5)	7.9 (46.2)	8.5 (47.3)	7.0 (44.6)	5.0 (41.0)	2.0 (35.6)	2.3 (36.1)	2.0 (35.6)
Average rainfall mm (inches)	22 (0.9)	26 (1.0)	70 (2.8)	146 (5.7)	108 (4.3)	63 (2.5)	105 (4.1)	121 (4.8)	126 (5.0)	94 (3.7)	37 (1.5)	23 (0.9)	941 (37.2)
Average rainy days	4	5	10	17	16	13	16	20	21	16	8	4	150
Average relative humidity (%) (daily average)	46	45	51	63	66	62	68	73	74	71	63	54	61
Average dew point °C (°F)	6 (43)	7 (45)	8 (46)	11 (52)	11 (52)	11 (52)	12 (54)	12 (54)	12 (54)	11 (52)	9 (48)	7 (45)	10 (50)
Source 1: National Meteorology Agency (average high and low)
Source 2: World Meteorological Organization (rainfall 1981–2010) Time and Date (dewpoints and humidity, 2005–2015)

== Demographics ==
The 2007 national census reported a total population for Robe of 44,382, of whom 22,543 were men and 21,839 were women. The plurality of inhabitants said they were Muslim, with 80% of the population reporting they observed this belief, while 15% of the population practised Ethiopian Orthodox Christianity and 5% were Protestant.

The 1994 national census reported this town had a total population of 21,516 of whom 10,462 were males and 11,054 were females.

== Education ==
Records at the Nordic Africa Institute website provide details of a primary school in Robe in 1968. List of Primary schools in Robe Town: Ali Birra Primary School, Madda Walabu Primary School, Kibxate Primary School, Robe Gelema Primary School, Zeybela Primary School, and General Umar Suleyman Primary School Numbers of secondary Schools in Bale Robe Town=5; Robe Secondary School, Robe Gelema Secondary School, Madda Walabu Secondary School, General Wako Gutu Secondary School, and General Umar Suleyman Secondary School and has one preparatory school which is called Robe preparatory School.

As of 2013, there are schools for secondary education in Bale Robe. There is also a teachers-training college, and university here called Madawalabu University.

== Transportation ==
The main mode of transport within the town is called a Bajaj.
