= Harenna shrew =

Conservation status
- Critically Endangered (IUCN 3.1)

Scientific classification
- Kingdom: Animalia
- Phylum: Chordata
- Class: Mammalia
- Order: Eulipotyphla
- Family: Soricidae
- Genus: Crocidura
- Species: C. harenna

Binomial name
- Crocidura harenna Hutterer & Yalden, 1990
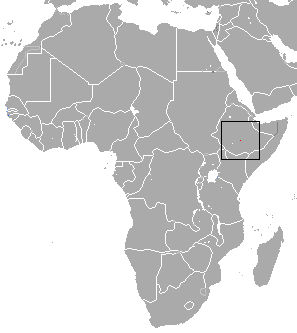
- Harenna shrew range

Species of mammal

The Harenna shrew (Crocidura harenna) is a white-toothed shrew found only in one location in the Bale Mountains in southern Ethiopia. It occurs within an area of less than ten square kilometres, and is listed as a critically endangered species, due to habitat loss and a restricted range.
