= Goba =

Town in Oromia Region, Ethiopia

Goba: Gobbaa (Oromo); ጎባ (Amharic); Bale Goba
- Town
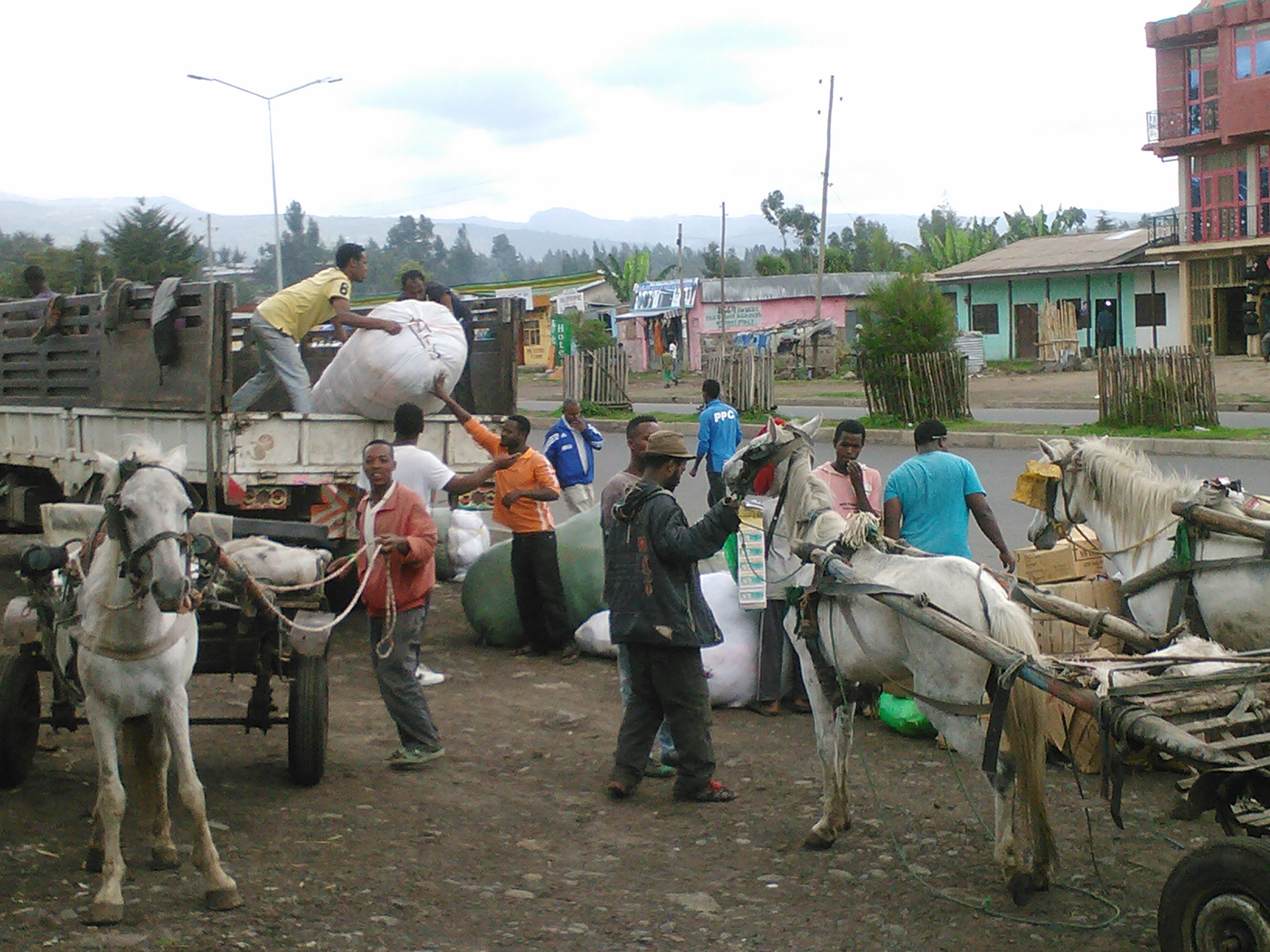
- Photo taken while in Goba Wednesday Market

- Location within Ethiopia Goba (Africa) Goba (Earth)
- Coordinates: 7°0′N 39°59′E
- Country: Ethiopia
- Region: (Oromia Region) Oromia
- Zone: Bale
- District: Goba
- Founded: 1900
- Founded by: Darge Sahle Selassie
- First Mayor: Blata Cheru (1945)

Government
  - Current Mayor: Shimels Alemu

Area
  - Land: 26.79 km^{2} (10.345 sq mi)
- Elevation: 2,743 m (8,999 ft)

Population (2016)
  - Town: 54,630
  - Density: 2,085/km^{2} (5,400/sq mi)
  - Urban: 49,309
  - Metro: 70,810
- Time zone: UTC+3 (EAT)
- Post Code: 4540
- Area code: (+251) 22
- Climate: Cwb

Goba (Oromo: Gobbaa, Amharic: ጎባ) is a town and separate woreda located in the Bale Zone of the Oromia Region, Ethiopia, approximately 446 km (277 mi) southeast of Addis Ababa, this city has a latitude and longitude of 7°0′N 39°59′E and an elevation of 2,743 meters (8,999 ft) above sea level.

The town is known for its Wednesday market and for honey, basketry, and cotton shawl making; Bale National Park is 10 km (6.2 mi) to the southwest. A few kilometers (miles) outside of Goba are the remains of an old rock church. Goba shares Robe Airport (ICAO code HAGB, IATA GOB) with neighbouring Robe.

Ethiopian Airlines has a scheduled flight four times a week connecting Goba to the capital Addis Ababa and to the southern city Arba Minch.

== History ==
Ras Darge Sahle Selassie advance into southern Arsi and Bale led to the development of a camp at Goba in 1900, which was the site of a medieval Christian rock church or monastery. In 1907 Goba became the main center of administration in Bale under the governorship of Leul Sagad.

Arnold Weinholt Hodson visited Goba while he was the British resident in southern Ethiopia (1914–1923), briefly describing it as a "large garrison town."

Goba was the capital of the former Bale Province, until the province was abolished with the adoption of the new constitution in 1995. A telephone line connected Goba to Addis Ababa at least as early as 1936. During the Bale revolt, rebels attacked the capital twice between November 1965 and March 1966. In 1970 the town had the only high school in Bale Province; that year the school had 682 students, of whom 86 were Muslims in a province where Islam claimed over 90 per cent of the population. As Gebru Tareke grimly concludes, "Between February 1970, when the revolt ended, and February 1974, when the imperial regime collapsed, precious little had changed in Bale, as indeed in the rest of Ethiopia."

According to the third edition of the Lonely Planet guide to Ethiopia, "Goba is in a state of decline and Ethiopian Airlines has even cancelled its flights here."

Starting from 1 September 2014, Ethiopian Airlines has announced a scheduled service four time per week to Robe Airport connecting Goba to Addis Ababa and Arba Minch.

== Demographics ==
The 2007 national census reported a total population for Goba of 32,025, of whom 15,182 were men and 16,843 were women; 4,797 or 6.13% of its population were urban dwellers. The majority of the inhabitants said they practiced Ethiopian Orthodox Christianity, with 69.84% of the population reporting they observed this belief, while 23.12% of the population were Muslim and 5.84% were Protestant.

The 1994 national census reported this town had a total population of 28,358 of whom 13,155 were men and 15,203 were women.

== Climate ==
Owing to its very high altitude, Goba has a subtropical highland climate (Köppen Cwb) with cool to cold mornings and mild to warm afternoons year-round. There is a lengthy rainy season from February/March to October, and a short dry season with chillier mornings from November to January.

Climate data for Goba
Month	Jan	Feb	Mar	Apr	May	Jun	Jul	Aug	Sep	Oct	Nov	Dec	Year
Mean daily maximum °C (°F)	23.3 (73.9)	23.6 (74.5)	23.8 (74.8)	22.6 (72.7)	23.1 (73.6)	23.6 (74.5)	22.5 (72.5)	22.0 (71.6)	22.0 (71.6)	21.3 (70.3)	21.4 (70.5)	22.5 (72.5)	22.6 (72.8)
Mean daily minimum °C (°F)	7.1 (44.8)	7.5 (45.5)	8.7 (47.7)	9.7 (49.5)	9.5 (49.1)	9.4 (48.9)	9.7 (49.5)	9.7 (49.5)	9.6 (49.3)	8.7 (47.7)	6.8 (44.2)	6.5 (43.7)	8.6 (47.5)
Average rainfall mm (inches)	38 (1.5)	55 (2.2)	101 (4.0)	162 (6.4)	150 (5.9)	109 (4.3)	151 (5.9)	187 (7.4)	149 (5.9)	110 (4.3)	44 (1.7)	16 (0.6)	1,272 (50.1)
Source: Climate-Data.org, altitude: 2,427 metres or 7,963 feet
