= Weyib River =

Weyib River Gestro, Webi
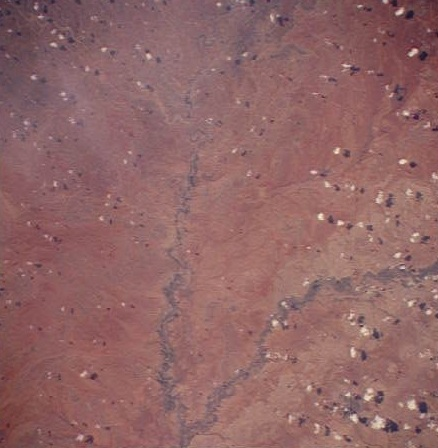
- Gestro/Weyib River (right) and Ganale River (center)

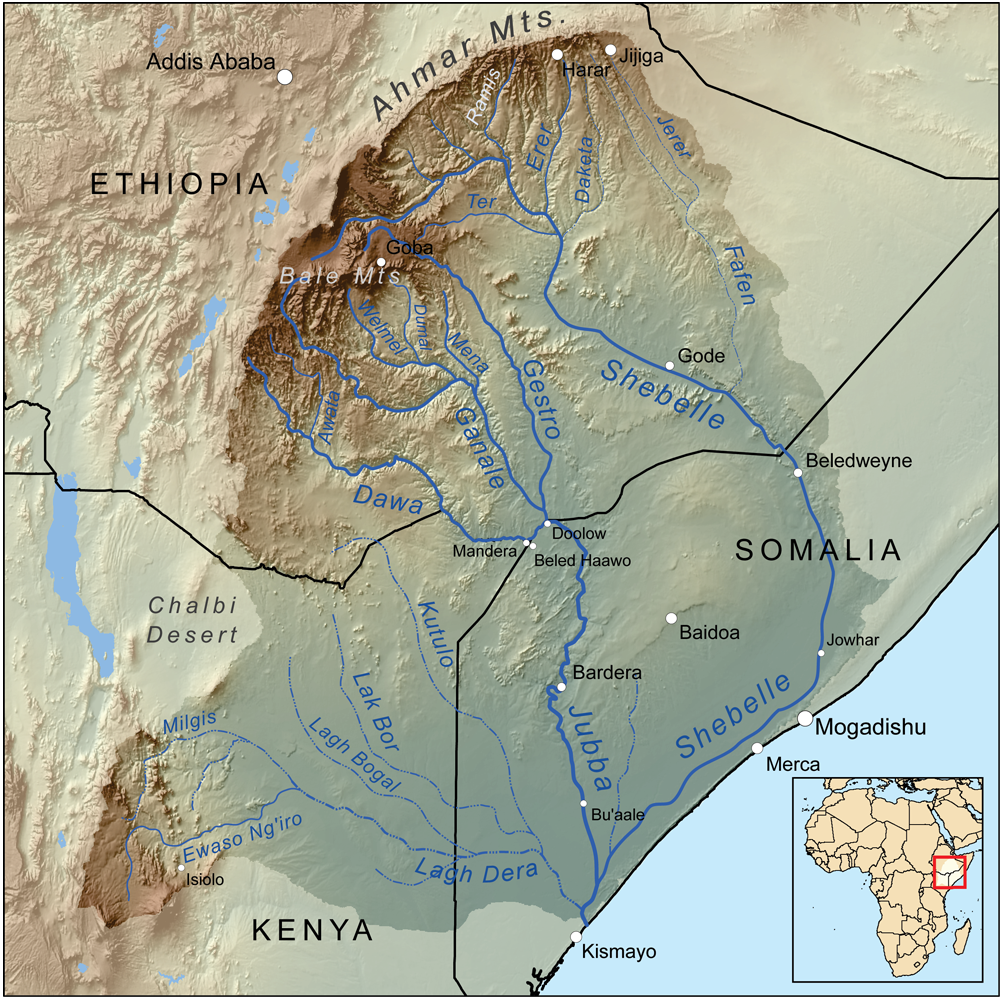
- Map of the Jubba/Shebelle drainage basin with the Weyib River (Gestro) at the centre

Location
- Country: Ethiopia
- Regions: Somali, Oromia

Physical characteristics
- Source
  - location: Bale Mountains
  - coordinates: 6°53′16″N 39°33′53″E
  - elevation: 3,709 m (12,169 ft)
- Mouth: Ganale Dorya River
  - location: Near Dolobay
  - coordinates: 4°17′12″N 42°2′35″E
  - elevation: 181 m (594 ft)
- Length: 657 km (408 mi)
- Basin size: 24,861 km^{2} (9,599 sq mi)
- Discharge
  - location: Mouth
  - average: 66.3 m^{3}/s (2,340 cu ft/s)
  - minimum: 8.81 m^{3}/s (311 cu ft/s)
  - maximum: 205.8 m^{3}/s (7,270 cu ft/s)

Basin features
- Progression: Ganale Dorya → Jubba → Somali Sea
- River system: Jubba Basin
- Landmarks: Sof Omar Caves
- Population: 1,150,000

Weyib River (also Webi Gestro; Wabē Gestro or Webi River) is a river of eastern Ethiopia. It rises in the Bale Mountains east of Goba in the Oromia Region, flowing east to pass through the Sof Omar Caves, then to the southeast until it joins the Ganale Dorya River in the Somali Region.

== See also ==
- List of rivers of Ethiopia
