= Bale Mountains =

Mountain ranges in southeastern Ethiopia

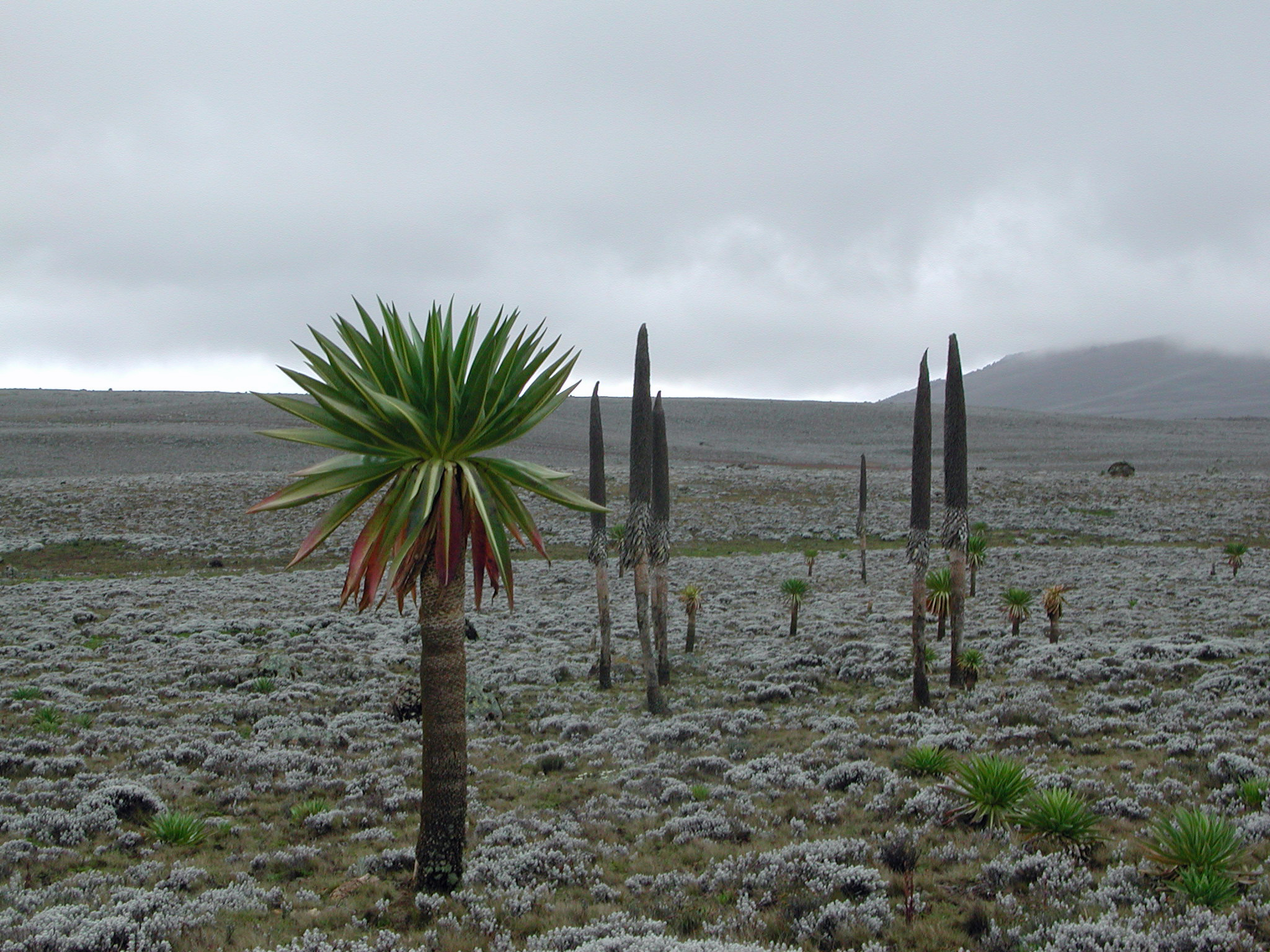
Giant lobelia in Bale Mountains National Park

The Bale Mountains (also known as the Urgoma Mountains) are mountain ranges in the Oromia Region of southeast Ethiopia, south of the Awash River, part of the Ethiopian Highlands. They include Tullu Demtu, the fourth-highest mountain in Ethiopia (4377 meters), and Mount Batu (4307 meters). The Weyib River, a tributary of the Jubba River, rises in these mountains east of Goba. The Bale Mountains National Park covers 2,200 square kilometers of these mountains. The park's main attractions are the wild alpine scenery and the relative ease with which visitors can see unique birds and mammals.

== Fauna ==
The Bale Mountains are home to many of Ethiopia's endemic animals, notably the Ethiopian wolf (Canis simensis), found on the Sanetti Plateau. The park also contains the Harenna Forest, situated to the south of the mountains, which is a largely unexplored area thought to contain many undiscovered species of reptile as well as lions, leopards, hyenas and various types of antelope. Besides wildlife, the National Park offers trekking opportunities from the park headquarters at Dinsho. (Dodola is also a useful base for exploring these mountains.)

The largest groups of Ethiopian wolves is found here. Other characteristic large mammals are mountain nyalas, Menelik's bushbucks, warthogs, and bohor reedbucks.

== Flora ==
The Juniper-Hagenia forests lie between 2,500 and 3,300 m and are mostly found on the northern slopes. An unusual plant of the Dinsho area is the white-flowered Abyssinian rose. The alpine moorland of the Sanetti Plateau is covered in heath-like vegetation broken by heather plants and stands of giant lobelia which grow up to 6 meters high. One of the most common and distinctive plants throughout the Bale region is the red-hot poker, an aloe which can be identified by its orange spear-shaped flowers.

== Archaeological findings ==
Archaeologists have discovered a 30,000-year-old Middle-Stone Age rock shelter at the Fincha Habera site in Bale Mountains of Ethiopia over 11,000 feet above sea level in 2019. According to the study published in the journal Science, this dwelling was the earliest proof of the highest-altitude of human occupation. Thousands of animal bones, hundreds of stone tools, and ancient fireplaces were revealed on the ground.

== See also ==
- History of Ethiopia
- Government of Ethiopia
- Culture of Ethiopia
