= Archaeology by country =

This is a list of articles covering the archaeology of present-day nations, states, and dependencies. Countries are listed in bold under their respective pages, whereas territories and dependencies are not. Disputed and unrecognized countries are italicized.

== A ==
- **Archaeology of Afghanistan** – Islamic Republic of Afghanistan
- **Archaeology of Albania** – Republic of Albania
- **Archaeology of Algeria** – People's Democratic Republic of Algeria
- **Archaeology of Andorra** – Principality of Andorra
- **Archaeology of Angola** – Republic of Angola
- **Archaeology of Antigua and Barbuda** – Antigua and Barbuda
- **Archaeology of Argentina** – Argentine Republic
- **Archaeology of Armenia** – Republic of Armenia
- **Archaeology of Aruba** – Aruba (Dutch crown dependency)
- **Archaeology of Australia** – Australia
- **Archaeology of Austria** – Republic of Austria
- **Archaeology of Azerbaijan** – Republic of Azerbaijan

== B ==
- **Archaeology of the Bahamas** – Commonwealth of The Bahamas
- **Archaeology of Bahrain** – Kingdom of Bahrain
- **Archaeology of Bangladesh** – People's Republic of Bangladesh
- **Archaeology of Barbados** – Barbados
- **Archaeology of Belarus** – Republic of Belarus
- **Archaeology of Belgium** – Kingdom of Belgium
- **Archaeology of Belize** – Belize
- **Archaeology of Benin** – Republic of Benin
- **Archaeology of Bhutan** – Kingdom of Bhutan
- **Archaeology of Bolivia** – Plurinational State of Bolivia
- **Archaeology of Bosnia and Herzegovina** – Bosnia and Herzegovina
- **Archaeology of Botswana** – Republic of Botswana
- **Archaeology of Brazil** – Federative Republic of Brazil
- **Archaeology of Brunei** – State of Brunei Darussalam
- **Archaeology of Bulgaria** – Republic of Bulgaria
- **Archaeology of Burkina Faso** – Burkina Faso
- **Archaeology of Burundi** – Republic of Burundi

== C ==
- **Archaeology of Cambodia** – Kingdom of Cambodia
- **Archaeology of Cameroon** – Republic of Cameroon
- **Archaeology of Canada** – Canada
- **Archaeology of Cape Verde** – Republic of Cape Verde
- **Archaeology of the Cayman Islands** – Cayman Islands (UK overseas territory)
- **Archaeology of the Central African Republic** – Central African Republic
- **Archaeology of Chad** – Republic of Chad
- **Archaeology of Chile** – Republic of Chile
- **Archaeology of China** – People's Republic of China
- **Archaeology of Colombia** – Republic of Colombia
- **Archaeology of Comoros** – Union of the Comoros
- **Archaeology of the Democratic Republic of the Congo** – Democratic Republic of the Congo
- **Archaeology of the Republic of the Congo** – Republic of the Congo
- **Archaeology of Costa Rica** – Republic of Costa Rica
- (Ivory Coast) **Archaeology of Côte d'Ivoire** – Republic of Côte d'Ivoire
- **Archaeology of Croatia** – Republic of Croatia
- **Archaeology of Cuba** – Republic of Cuba
- **Archaeology of Cyprus** – Republic of Cyprus
- **Archaeology of the Czech Republic** – Czech Republic

== D ==
- **Archaeology of Denmark** – Kingdom of Denmark
- **Archaeology of Djibouti** – Republic of Djibouti
- **Archaeology of Dominica** – Commonwealth of Dominica
- **Archaeology of the Dominican Republic** – Dominican Republic

== E ==
- **Archaeology of East Timor (Timor-Leste)** – Democratic Republic of Timor-Leste
- **Archaeology of Ecuador** – Republic of Ecuador
- **Archaeology of Egypt** – Arab Republic of Egypt
- **Archaeology of El Salvador** – Republic of El Salvador
- **Archaeology of Equatorial Guinea** – Republic of Equatorial Guinea
- **Archaeology of Eritrea** – State of Eritrea
- **Archaeology of Estonia** – Republic of Estonia
- **Archaeology of Eswatini (Swaziland)** – Kingdom of Eswatini
- **Archaeology of Ethiopia** – Federal Democratic Republic of Ethiopia

== F ==
- **Archaeology of the Falkland Islands** – Falkland Islands (British overseas territories)
- **Archaeology of the Faroe Islands** – Faroe Islands (Self-governing country in the Kingdom of Denmark)
- **Archaeology of Fiji** – Republic of the Fiji Islands
- **Archaeology of Finland** – Republic of Finland
- **Archaeology of France** – French Republic
- **Archaeology of French Guiana** – French Guiana (French overseas community)
- **Archaeology of French Polynesia** – French Polynesia (French overseas community)

== G ==
- **Archaeology of Gabon** – Gabonese Republic
- **Archaeology of the Gambia** – Republic of The Gambia
- See Archaeology of Palestine for Gaza Strip
- (Georgia (country)) **Archaeology of Georgia** – Georgia
- **Archaeology of Germany** – Federal Republic of Germany
- **Archaeology of Ghana** – Republic of Ghana
- **Archaeology of Gibraltar** – Gibraltar (UK overseas territory)
- **Archaeology of Greece** – Hellenic Republic
- **Archaeology of Greenland** – Greenland (Self-governing country in the Kingdom of Denmark)
- **Archaeology of Grenada** – Grenada
- **Archaeology of Guadeloupe** – Guadeloupe (French overseas community)
- **Archaeology of Guam** – Territory of Guam (US overseas territory)
- **Archaeology of Guatemala** – Republic of Guatemala
- **Archaeology of Guinea** – Republic of Guinea
- **Archaeology of Guinea-Bissau** – Republic of Guinea-Bissau
- **Archaeology of Guyana** – Co-operative Republic of Guyana

== H ==
- **Archaeology of Haiti** – Republic of Haiti
- **Archaeology of Honduras** – Republic of Honduras
- **Archaeology of Hong Kong** – Hong Kong Special Administrative Region of the People's Republic of China (Area of special sovereignty)
- **Archaeology of Hungary** – Republic of Hungary

== I ==
- **Archaeology of Iceland** – Republic of Iceland
- **Archaeology of India** – Republic of India
- **Archaeology of Indonesia** – Republic of Indonesia
- **Archaeology of Iran** – Islamic Republic of Iran
- **Archaeology of Iraq** – Republic of Iraq
- (Republic of Ireland) **Archaeology of Ireland** – Ireland
- See Archaeology of the Falkland Islands for Islas Malvinas
- **Archaeology of the Isle of Man** – Isle of Man (British Crown dependency)
- **Archaeology of Israel** – State of Israel
- **Archaeology of Italy** – Italian Republic

== J ==
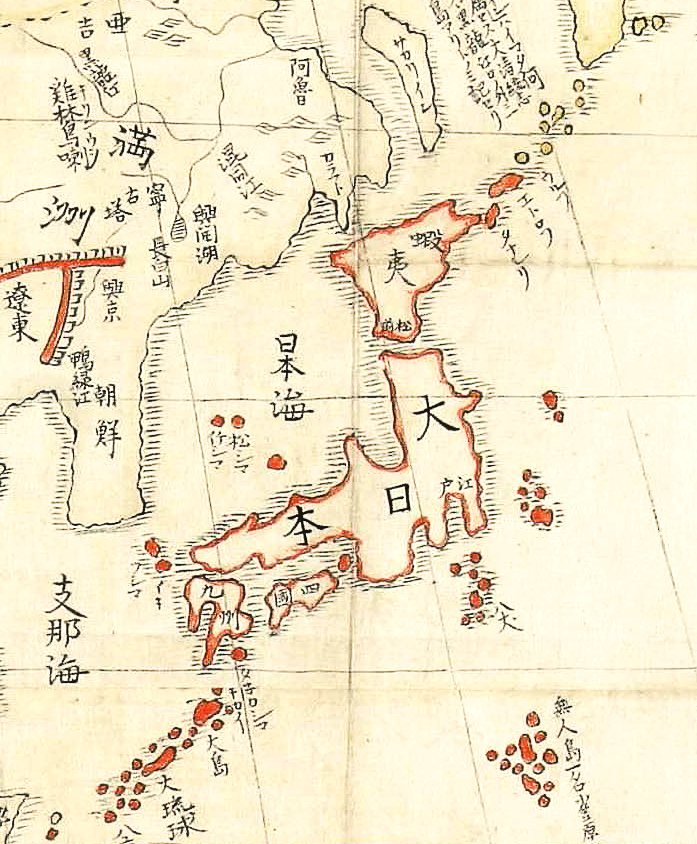
Archaeology of Japan

- **Archaeology of Jamaica** – Jamaica
- **Archaeology of Japan** – Japan
- **Archaeology of Jersey** – Jersey (British crown dependency)
- **Archaeology of Jordan** – Hashemite Kingdom of Jordan

== K ==
- **Archaeology of Kazakhstan** – Republic of Kazakhstan
- **Archaeology of Kenya** – Republic of Kenya
- **Archaeology of Kiribati** – Republic of Kiribati
- **Archaeology of North Korea** – Democratic People's Republic of Korea
- **Archaeology of South Korea (Republic of)** – Republic of Korea
- **Archaeology of Kosovo** – Kosovo Republic
- **Archaeology of Kuwait** – State of Kuwait
- **Archaeology of Kyrgyzstan** – Kyrgyz Republic

== L ==
- **Archaeology of Laos** – Lao People's Democratic Republic
- **Archaeology of Latvia** – Republic of Latvia
- **Archaeology of Lebanon** – Republic of Lebanon
- **Archaeology of Lesotho** – Kingdom of Lesotho
- **Archaeology of Liberia** – Republic of Liberia
- **Archaeology of Libya** – Great Socialist People's Libyan Arab Jamahiriya
- **Archaeology of Liechtenstein** – Principality of Liechtenstein
- **Archaeology of Lithuania** – Republic of Lithuania
- **Archaeology of Luxembourg** – Grand Duchy of Luxembourg
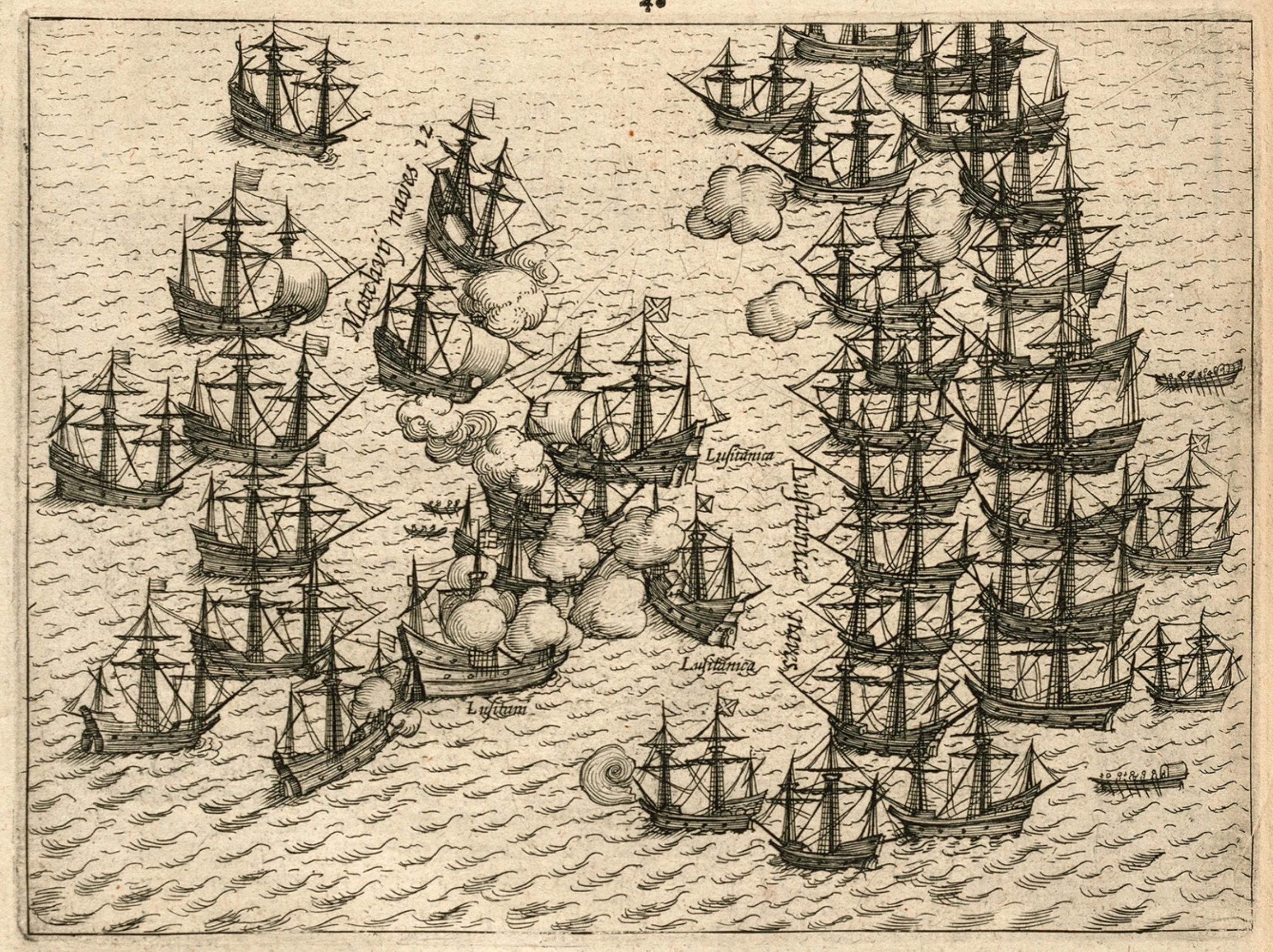
  Archaeology of Malaysia

== M ==
- **Archaeology of Madagascar** – Republic of Madagascar
- **Archaeology of Malawi** – Republic of Malawi
- **Archaeology of Malaysia** – Malaysia
- **Archaeology of the Maldives** – Republic of Maldives
- **Archaeology of Mali** – Republic of Mali
- **Archaeology of Malta** – Republic of Malta
- **Archaeology of the Marshall Islands** – Republic of the Marshall Islands
- **Archaeology of Mauritania** – Islamic Republic of Mauritania
- **Archaeology of Mauritius** – Republic of Mauritius
- **Archaeology of Mayotte** – Mayotte (French overseas community)
- **Archaeology of Mexico** – United Mexican States
- **Archaeology of the Federated States of Micronesia** – Federated States of Micronesia
- **Archaeology of Moldova** – Republic of Moldova
- **Archaeology of Monaco** – Principality of Monaco
- **Archaeology of Mongolia** – Mongolia
- **Archaeology of Montenegro** – Republic of Montenegro
- **Archaeology of Montserrat** – Montserrat (UK overseas territory)
- **Archaeology of Morocco** – Kingdom of Morocco
- **Archaeology of Mozambique** – Republic of Mozambique
- **Archaeology of Myanmar** – Republic of the Union of Myanmar

== N ==
- **Archaeology of Namibia** – Republic of Namibia
- **Archaeology of Nauru** – Republic of Nauru
- **Archaeology of Nepal** – Federal Democratic Republic of Nepal
- **Archaeology of the Netherlands** – Kingdom of the Netherlands
- **Archaeology of the Netherlands Antilles** – Netherlands Antilles (Self-governing country in the Kingdom of the Netherlands)
- **Archaeology of New Caledonia** – Territory of New Caledonia and Dependencies (French community sui generis)
- **Archaeology of New Zealand** – New Zealand
- **Archaeology of Nicaragua** – Republic of Nicaragua
- **Archaeology of Niger** – Republic of Niger
- **Archaeology of Nigeria** – Federal Republic of Nigeria
- **Archaeology of Niue** – Niue (Associated state of New Zealand)
- **Archaeology of Northern Cyprus** – Turkish Republic of Northern Cyprus
- **Archaeology of the Northern Mariana Islands** – Commonwealth of the Northern Mariana Islands (US overseas commonwealth)
- **Archaeology of North Macedonia** – North Macedonia
- **Archaeology of Norway** – Kingdom of Norway

== O ==
- **Archaeology of Oman** – Sultanate of Oman

== P ==
- **Archaeology of Pakistan** – Islamic Republic of Pakistan
- **Archaeology of Palau** – Republic of Palau
- (Palestinian Authority) **Archaeology of Palestine** – State of Palestine
- **Archaeology of Panama** – Republic of Panama
- **Archaeology of Papua New Guinea** – Independent State of Papua New Guinea
- **Archaeology of Paraguay** – Republic of Paraguay
- **Archaeology of Peru** – Republic of Peru
- **Archaeology of the Philippines** – Republic of the Philippines
- **Archaeology of the Pitcairn Islands** – Pitcairn, Henderson, Ducie, and Oeno Islands (UK overseas territory)
- **Archaeology of Poland** – Republic of Poland
- **Archaeology of Portugal** – Portuguese Republic
- **Archaeology of Puerto Rico** – Commonwealth of Puerto Rico (US overseas commonwealth)

== Q ==
- **Archaeology of Qatar** – State of Qatar

== R ==
- **Archaeology of Romania** – Romania
- **Archaeology of Russia** – Russian Federation
- **Archaeology of Rwanda** – Republic of Rwanda

== S ==
- **Archaeology of Saint Kitts and Nevis** – Federation of Saint Christopher and Nevis
- **Archaeology of Saint Lucia** – Saint Lucia
- **Archaeology of Saint-Pierre and Miquelon** – Saint Pierre and Miquelon (French overseas community)
- **Archaeology of Saint Vincent and the Grenadines** – Saint Vincent and the Grenadines
- **Archaeology of Samoa** – Independent State of Samoa
- **Archaeology of San Marino** – Most Serene Republic of San Marino
- **Archaeology of São Tomé and Príncipe** – Democratic Republic of São Tomé and Príncipe
- **Archaeology of Saudi Arabia** – Kingdom of Saudi Arabia
- **Archaeology of Senegal** – Republic of Senegal
- **Archaeology of Serbia** – Republic of Serbia
- **Archaeology of Seychelles** – Republic of Seychelles
- **Archaeology of Sierra Leone** – Republic of Sierra Leone
- **Archaeology of Singapore** – Republic of Singapore
- **Archaeology of Slovakia** – Slovak Republic
- **Archaeology of Slovenia** – Republic of Slovenia
- **Archaeology of Solomon Islands** – Solomon Islands
- **Archaeology of Somalia** – Federal Republic of Somalia
- Archaeology of Somaliland – Republic of Somaliland
- **Archaeology of South Africa** – Republic of South Africa
- **Archaeology of South Ossetia** – Republic of South Ossetia
- **Archaeology of South Sudan** – Republic of South Sudan
- **Archaeology of Spain** – Kingdom of Spain
- **Archaeology of Sri Lanka** – Democratic Socialist Republic of Sri Lanka
- **Archaeology of Sudan** – Republic of the Sudan
- **Archaeology of Suriname** – Republic of Suriname
- **Archaeology of Svalbard** – Svalbard (Territory of Norway)
- **Archaeology of Sweden** – Kingdom of Sweden
- **Archaeology of Switzerland** – Swiss Confederation
- **Archaeology of Syria** – Syrian Arab Republic

== T ==
- **Archaeology of Taiwan** – Republic of China
- **Archaeology of Tajikistan** – Republic of Tajikistan
- **Archaeology of Tanzania** – United Republic of Tanzania
- **Archaeology of Thailand** – Kingdom of Thailand
- **Archaeology of Togo** – Togolese Republic
- **Archaeology of Tokelau** – Tokelau (Territory of New Zealand)
- **Archaeology of Tonga** – Kingdom of Tonga
- Archaeology of Transnistria – Pridnestrovian Moldavian Republic
- **Archaeology of Trinidad and Tobago** – Republic of Trinidad and Tobago
- **Archaeology of Tunisia** – Tunisian Republic
- **Archaeology of Turkey** – Republic of Turkey
- **Archaeology of Turkmenistan** – Turkmenistan
- **Archaeology of the Turks and Caicos Islands** – Turks and Caicos Islands (UK overseas territory)
- **Archaeology of Tuvalu** – Tuvalu

== U ==
- **Archaeology of Uganda** – Republic of Uganda
- **Archaeology of Ukraine** – Ukraine
- **Archaeology of the United Arab Emirates** – United Arab Emirates
- **Archaeology of the United Kingdom** – United Kingdom of Great Britain and Northern Ireland
- **Archaeology of the United States** – United States of America
- **Archaeology of Uruguay** – Oriental Republic of Uruguay
- **Archaeology of Uzbekistan** – Republic of Uzbekistan

== V ==
- **Archaeology of Vanuatu** – Republic of Vanuatu
- **Archaeology of Venezuela** – Bolivarian Republic of Venezuela
- **Archaeology of Vietnam** – Socialist Republic of Vietnam
- **Archaeology of the Virgin Islands** – United States Virgin Islands (US overseas territory)

== W ==
- See Archaeology of Palestine for West Bank
- Archaeology of Western Sahara – Western Sahara

== Y ==
- **Archaeology of Yemen** – Republic of Yemen

== Z ==
- **Archaeology of Zambia** – Republic of Zambia
- **Archaeology of Zimbabwe** – Republic of Zimbabwe

== See also ==
- List of archaeological sites by country
- History by country
