= Lucayan =

Lucayan may refer to:

- Lucayan Archipelago, comprising the Bahamas and the Turks and Caicos Islands
- Lucayan people, the Indigenous people of the Bahamas before the arrival of Europeans
- Lucayan language, a dialect of the extinct Taíno language
- Lucayan Formation, a geologic formation in the Bahamas
- a resident of Lucaya, Bahamas
