= Mifsas Bahri =

Coordinates: 12°34′37″N 39°28′49″E

Mifsas Bahri is an archaeological site on the southern border of the Tigray region of Ethiopia. It is located 200m southwest of present-day Lake Ashenge and has an attitude of about 2464 m.

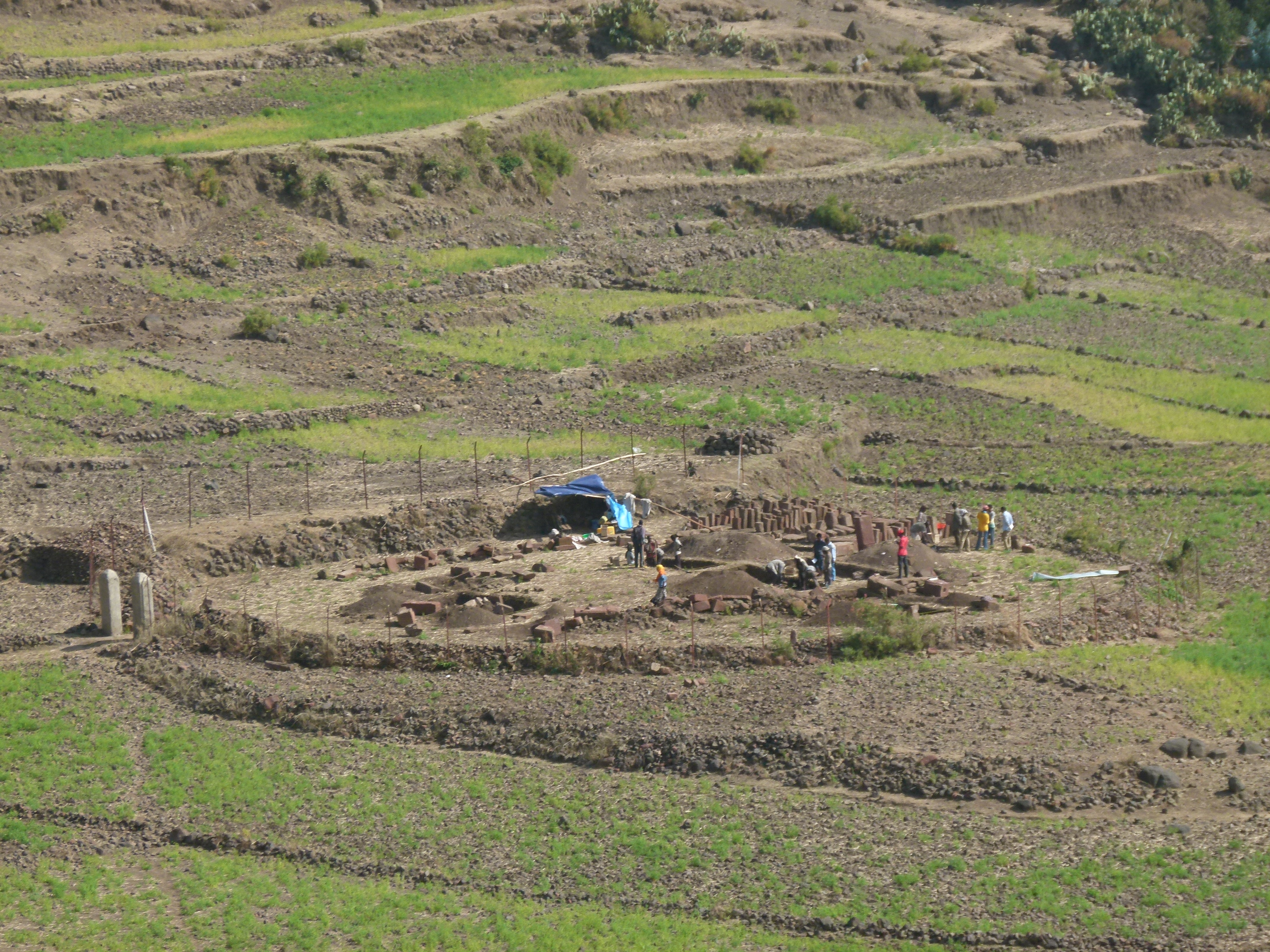
The stone building at Mifsas Bahri viewed toward the north

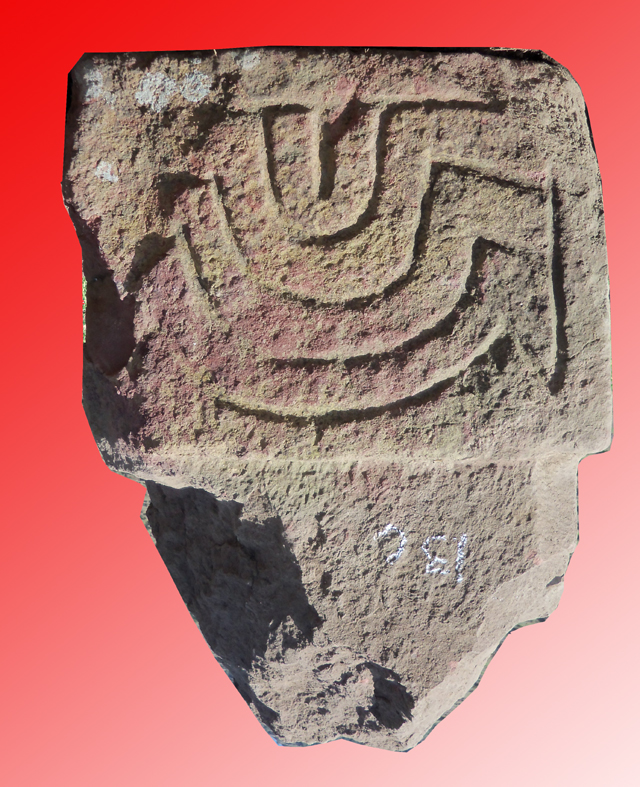
Mifsas Bahri, Tigray, Ethiopia, pier capital perhaps produced in the 7th century CE, surface find, Heidelberg-Mekelle Expedition, 2013

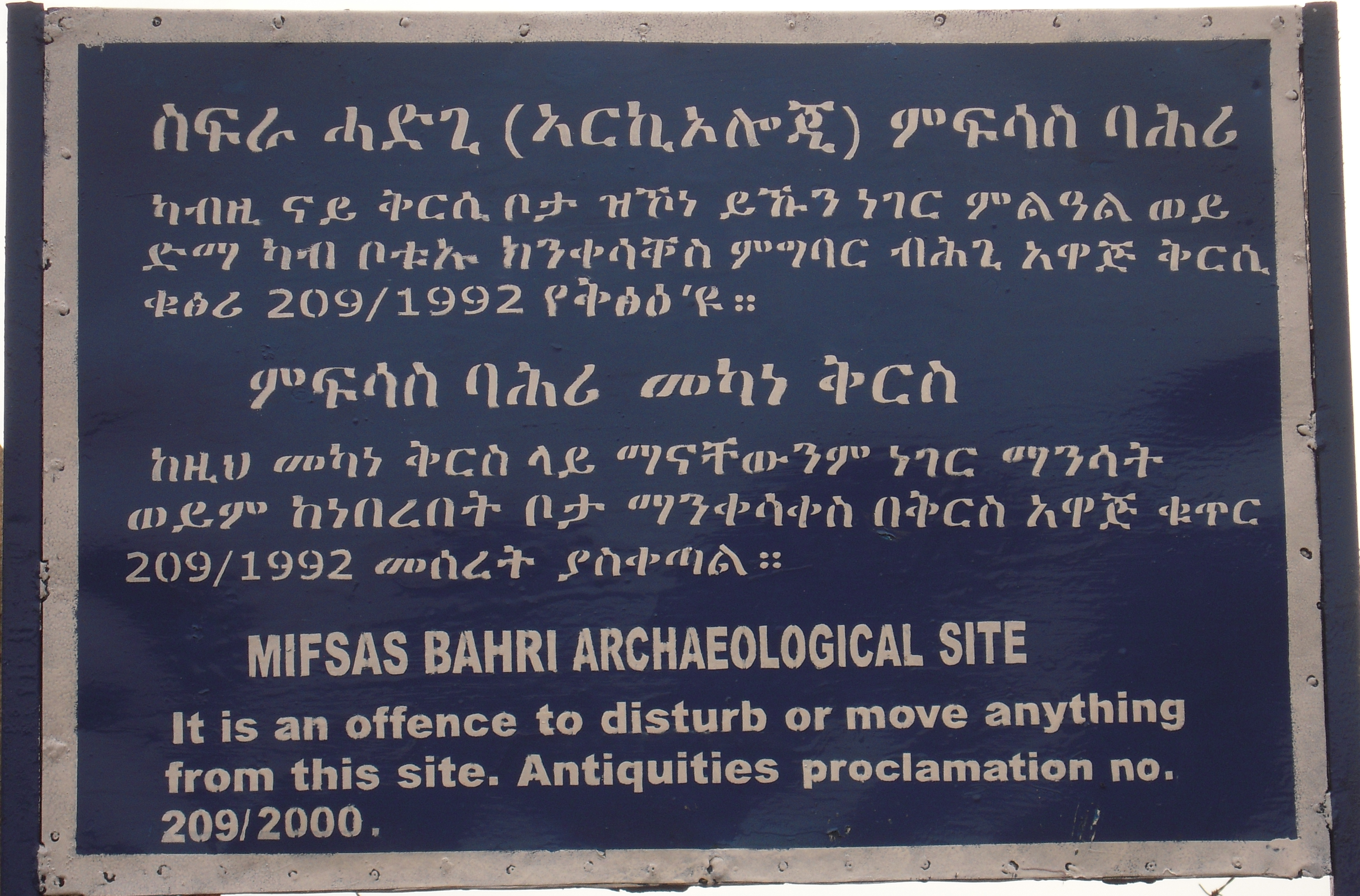
Sign written in Tigrinya, Amharic and English. Protected monument.

This highland site contains the ruin of a substantial building constructed of bright red dressed ashlar which may date early as the 6th or 7th century. Lying 200 m west of the shore of Lake Hashinge, the site came to the attention of antiquities authorities in 1997 as a result of alleged exploitation of its building stone on the part of the local population. In 2013 a group led by Paul A. Yule from Mekelle University and Heidelberg University began to investigate the site.

== Ruins ==
The building at Mifsas Bahri is a church, to judge from the orientation, masonry excellence and architectural relief sculpture. Preliminarily, the building appears to have undergone three phases including a squatter occupation. Radiocarbon dating suggests that it went out of use in the 15th century.

Historical reconstruction and local tradition had it that it was destroyed in the 1540s by the mixed forces of Aḥmad ibn Ibrahīm al-Ġazī. This contradicts a few recent unpublished radiocarbon dates, which suggest a building and construction considerably earlier. Excavation confirmed the presence of a monumental stone building some 20 m x 35 m in surface area. According to local sources the church was named Gebre Menfes Kidus.

== See also ==
- Archaeology of Ethiopia
