= Archaeology of Albania =

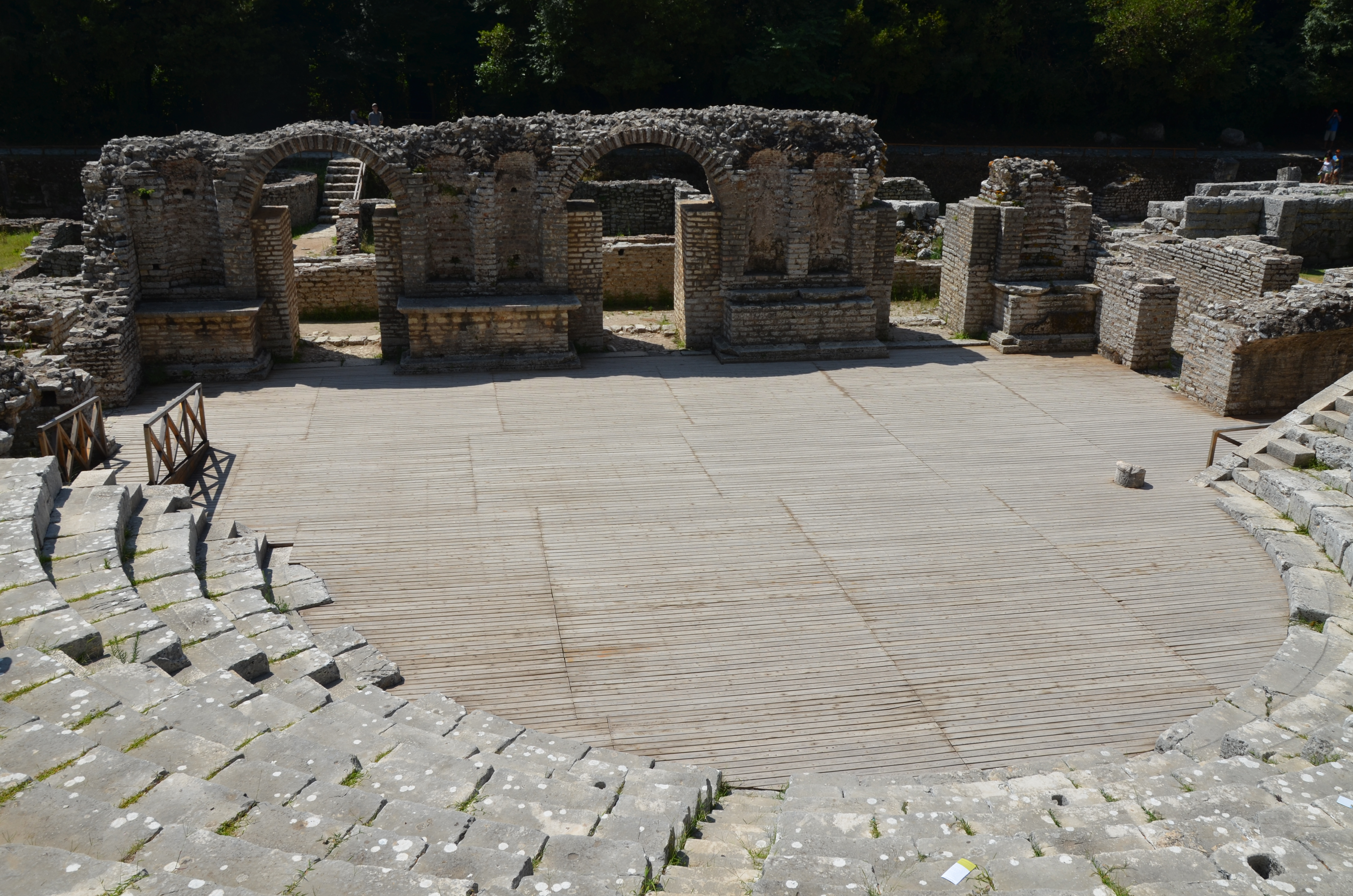
Ancient theatre in Butrint, Albania

Archaeology of Albania represents a field of significant importance in uncovering the history and ancient culture of the Balkan region. Albania's geographical location has positioned it as a crossroads between the great civilizations of the Mediterranean and Southeastern Europe, making it rich in archaeological findings. Excavations and research have unveiled ancient civilizations, from the Bronze and Iron Ages to the Illyrian, Greek, Roman, and Byzantine periods.

== The beginnings of archaeology ==
Archaeology in Albania began developing as a discipline in the early 20th century, when foreign and local researchers initiated studies on the country's cultural heritage and historical monuments. In the 1920s, Albanian-French agreements ushered in a period of intensive research, bringing notable figures like Léon Rey, who led the French archaeological mission. He conducted significant excavations in the ancient city of Apollonia, where monumental structures such as the stoa, the bouleuterion, and the odeon were unearthed.

== Illyrians and antiquity ==
Illyrian culture holds a central place in Albanian archaeology. Cities such as Byllis, Amantia, Lissus (Lezhë), Shkodra, and Dimale demonstrate the advanced political and economic organization of these communities. During the Greek and Roman periods, cities like Butrint and Durrës flourished as important trade and cultural centers. Butrint, a UNESCO World Heritage Site, stands as a remarkable example of ancient architecture and urban planning in this part of the Balkans.

== The role of Albanian archaeologists ==
Following Albania's independence, archaeology experienced a new phase of development under the guidance of Albanian archaeologists such as Hasan Ceka, Aleks Buda, and Selim Islami. They worked to establish a scientific approach rooted in evidence and modern research methodology. The establishment of the Institute of Archaeology in 1976 further strengthened this field, promoting systematic excavations and interdisciplinary studies.

== See also ==
- List of museums in Albania
- Cultural heritage of Albania
