= Archaeology of Ethiopia =

Overview in history of architecture in Ethiopia

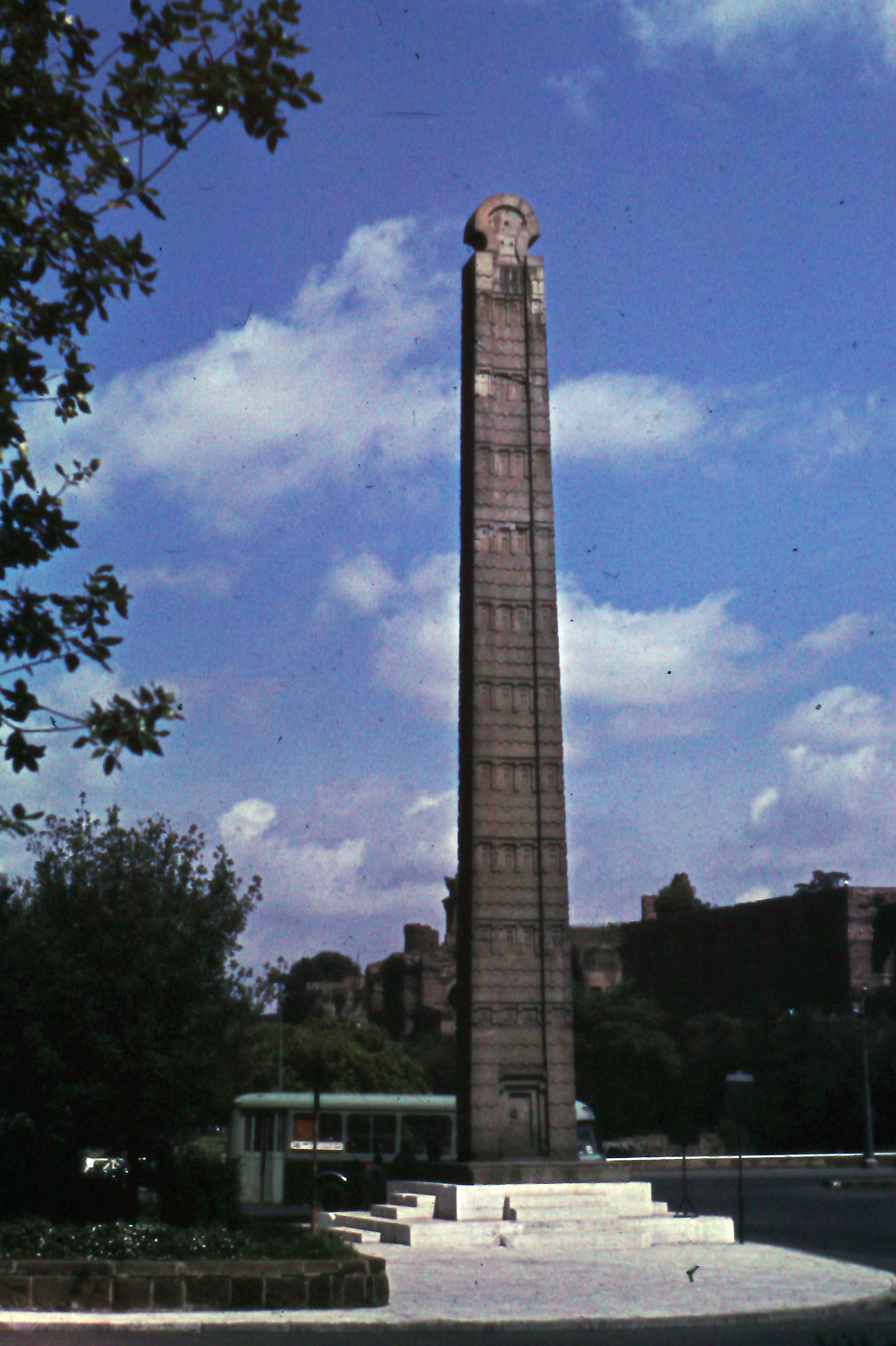
The obelisk which the ruler of Italy, Benito Mussolini, gave order should be moved from Axum in Ethiopia to Rome, where it stood in front of the FAO headquarters until 2005. Picture taken in the 1960s.

Ethiopia has several UNESCO World Heritage Sites related to archaeology which include Axum, one of the oldest continuously inhabited places in Africa, the Awash Valley where Lucy, a hominin who lived around 3.2 million years ago was discovered, and Tiya, where Middle Stone Age tools and megaliths have been found.

== Notable sites and finds ==
Ethiopia is well known for its significant fossil-bearing beds which have borne some of the oldest and most complete fossil hominids. One well-known example is Lucy. Her hominid species Australopithecus afarensis is named after the Afar Ethiopian region where it was discovered. Other discoveries are still being made.

In 2019, archaeologists discovered a 30,000-year-old Middle-Stone Age rock shelter at the Fincha Habera site in Bale Mountains of Ethiopia at over 11,000 feet above sea level. This dwelling was the earliest proof of the highest-altitude of human occupation. Thousands of animal bones, hundreds of stone tools, and ancient fireplaces were revealed.

Excavations at Mochena Borago Rockshelter in the Southwest Ethiopian Highlands have been taking place since 1998. The site is important for testing the "refugium theory" which suggests that during cold, arid periods in the past, humans took refuge in this region as it would have been more habitable than the surrounding region.

Around 2000, archaeologists uncovered the ruins of the legendary ancient Islamic kingdom of Shoa, that included evidence of a large urban settlement as well as a large mosque.

== Cultural heritage ==
In April 2005, the Obelisk of Axum, one of Ethiopia's religious and historical treasures, was returned to Ethiopia by Italy.

== See also ==
- Porc-Epic Cave
- Melka Kunture
- Omo remains
- Fincha Habera Rockshelter
- Mifsas Bahri
- Mota Cave, Ethiopia
