= Léon Rey =

French archaeologist (1887–1954)

Leon Rey (27 August 1887 – 3 November 1954) was a French archaeologist. He is known for his significant contributions to archaeology in Albania. He was the head of the French archaeological mission in Albania, established based on the Albanian-French agreement of 1923, which granted him a 30-year concession for archaeological research and excavations in the prefectures of Shkodër, Durrës, and Vlorë. In Durrës, he conducted only limited surveys. From 1924 to 1938, excavations at Apollonia were carried out, during which significant discoveries were made, including the stoa, bouleuterion, odeon, and other monuments.

== Biography ==
Rey was born on 27 August 1887 in Faremoutiers. After studying law, Rey attended the École des Chartes. During World War I, he was mobilized in the infantry and participated in the Battle of Verdun. In 1916, he requested to be assigned to the Army of the Orient, where he joined the Archaeological Service in Salonica. There, he met François Thureau-Dangin and continued the research of Gustave Mendel on the primitive habitats and Greco-Macedonian necropolises in the region.

Rey created a descriptive, geographical, and topographical inventory of the sites in Salonica, which was the first thorough exploration of the area. After the war, he visited Mount Athos and Albania, then established a dig near the monastery of Pojani at Apollonia of Illyria from 1923 to 1924.

In 1925, he founded the journal "Albania: Review of Archaeology, History, Art and Applied Sciences in Albania and the Balkans," publishing his findings there until 1939. He also founded the Vlorë Museum in 1937, which was destroyed during the Italian invasion of Albania.

Rey made efforts to display the discovered artifacts and to establish a museum in Fier, but this project was not supported by the government at the time. In 1936, with the support of patriots, he converted the historic building in Vlorë, where the national government had its seat after the proclamation of independence in 1912, into an archaeological museum.

The results of his excavations and other studies in archaeology, history, and art were published by Leon Rey and his collaborators in a special journal, "Albanie, Cahiers d'Archeologie, d'Histoire et d'Art en Albanie et dans les Balkans," which issued six volumes.

In 1945, Rey attempted to return to the Apollonia site but was denied entry. Disheartened, he abandoned archaeology and dedicated himself to archival work and the study of the city of Versailles. He died on 3 November 1954 in Paris, and was buried in Père-Lachaise Cemetery (18th division). Rey is honored in Albania for his contributions to uncovering and preserving the country's historical heritage.

== Publications ==
- « Les observations sur les premiers habitats de la Macédoine », Bulletin de correspondance hellénique, t. 41 et 43, 1921
- Classification des céramiques antiques : Céramique de la région macédonienne, 1923
- Guide de l'Albanie, avec une carte des voies d'accès, une carte routière et les plans de Scutari, Tirana et Korcha, 1930
- Le Petit Trianon et le hameau de Marie-Antoinette, 1936
- Deux botanistes français aux États-Unis – Les missions des Michaux, père et fils (1785-1808), 1954. Livre non publié dont les épreuves subsistent dans les manuscrits du Museum national d’histoire naturelle.
