= Archaeology of Algeria =

Algeria on the map.

The archeology in Algeria is rich in prehistoric memorials of human occupation. Algeria contains many Roman remains and is rich in monuments of Saracenic art.

== Megalithic remains ==
Algeria has many megalithic remains, of which nearly every known kind has been found in the country. Numerous flints of palaeolithic type have been discovered, notably at Tlemcen and Kolea. Near Djelfa, in the Great Atlas, and at Mechra-Sfa ("ford of the flat stones"), a peninsula in the valley of the river Mina not far from Tiaret, are vast numbers of megalithic monuments.

Notable among the prehistoric cultures of the area is the Capsian culture, whose shell-mounds are found throughout the north.

== Famous sites ==
=== Madghacen ===
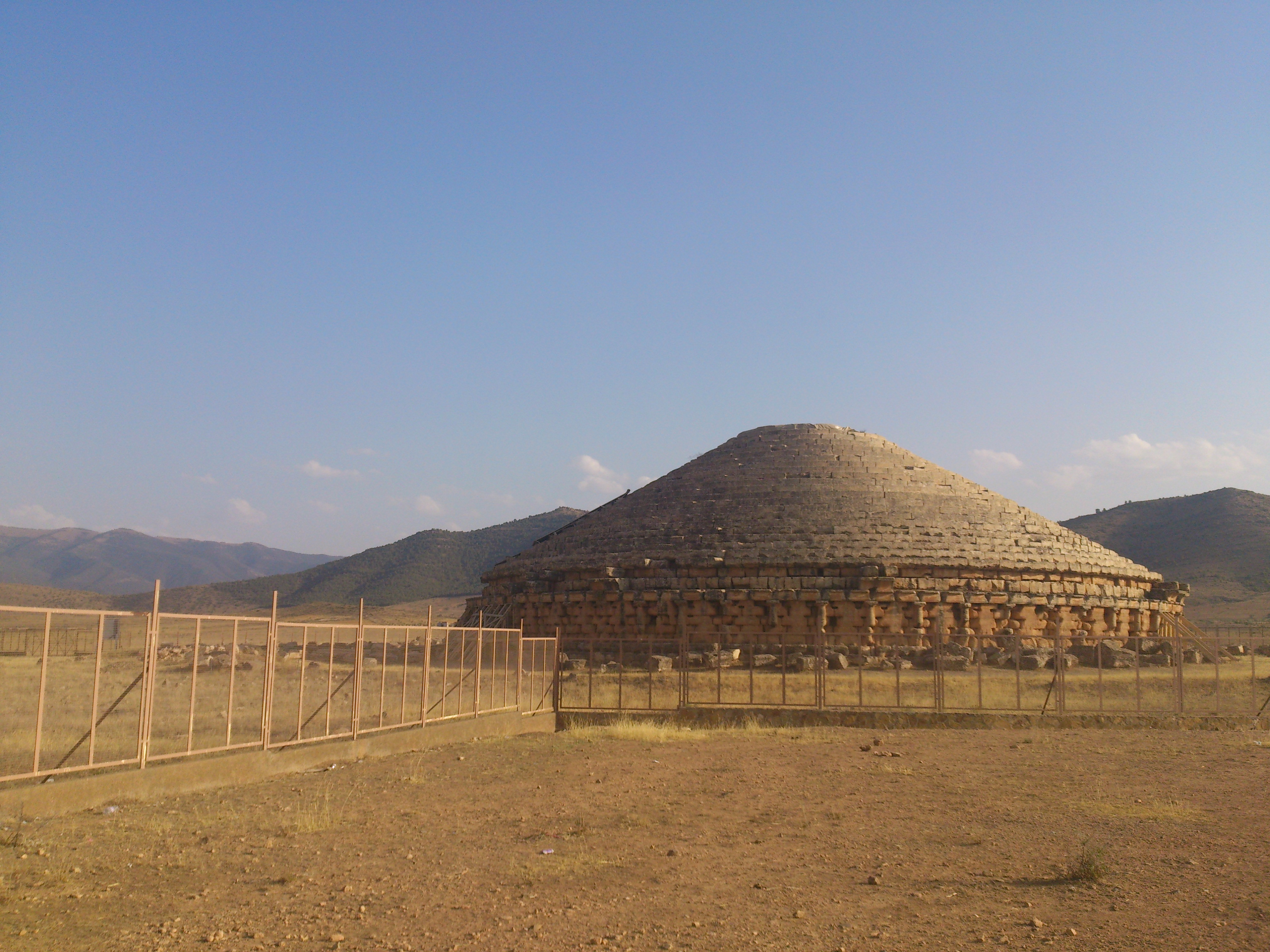
Tumulus shaped tomb at Madghacen.

Madghacen is a monument similar to the Qabr-er-Rumia, but older. It was built around 150 B.C. as the burial place of the Numidian kings, and is situated 35 miles (56 km) southwest of Constantine. The form is that of a truncated cone, placed on a cylindrical base, 196 ft (60 m) in diameter. It is 60 ft (18 m) high. The columns encircling the cylindrical portion are stunted and much broader at the base than the top; the capitals are Doric. Many of the columns, 60 in number, have been much damaged. When the sepulchral chamber was opened in 1873 by Bauchetet, a French engineer officer, clear evidence was found that at some remote period the tomb had been rifled and an attempt made to destroy it by fire.

=== Qabr-er-Rumia ===
The Qabr-er-Rumia-- best known by its French name, Tombeau de la Chrétienne (grave of the Christian lady), tradition making it the burial-place of Florinda, la Cava Rumía, the beautiful and unfortunate daughter of Count Julian—is near Kolea, and is known to be the tomb of the Mauretanian king Juba II and of his wife Cleopatra Selene, daughter of Mark Antony and Cleopatra, queen of Egypt. It is built on a hill 756 ft (230 m) above the sea. A circular stone building surmounted by a pyramid rests on a lower platform, 209 ft (64 m) square.

Originally the monument was about 130 ft (40 m) in height, but it has been wantonly damaged. Its height is now 100 ft 8 in (30.68 m): the cylindrical portion 36 ft 6 in (11.13 m), the pyramid 64 ft 2 in (19.56 m) The base, 198 ft (60 m) in diameter, is ornamented with 60 engaged Ionic columns. The capitals of the columns have disappeared, but their design is preserved among the drawings of James Bruce, the African traveller.

In the centre of the tomb are two vaulted chambers, reached by a spiral passage or gallery 6 1/2 ft broad (2.0 m), about the same height, and 489 ft long (149 m). The sepulchral chambers are separated by a short passage, and are cut off from the gallery by stone doors made of a single slab which can be moved up and down by levers, like a portcullis. The larger of the two chambers is 142 ft (43 m) long by 11 ft (3.4 m) broad and 11 ft (3.4 m) high. The other chamber is somewhat smaller.

The tomb was previously looted, probably in search of treasure. In 1555, Salah Rais, pasha of Algiers, set men to work to pull it down, but the records say that the attempt was given up because big black wasps came from under the stones and stung them to death. At the end of the 18th century, Baba Mahommed tried in vain to batter down the tomb with artillery. In 1866 it was explored by order of the emperor Napoleon III, the work being carried out by Adrien Berbrugger and Oscar Maccarthy.

=== The Jedars ===
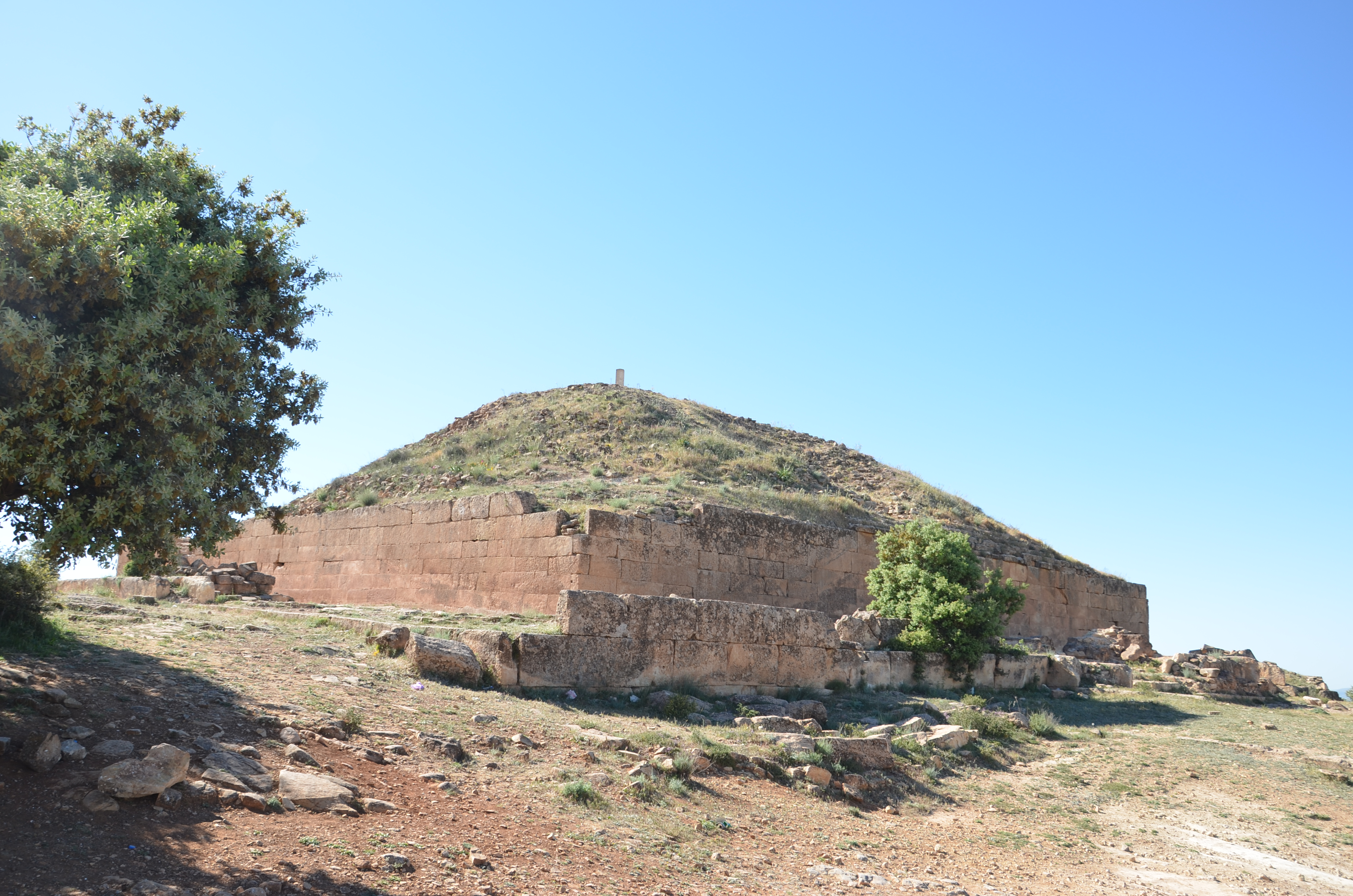
Djeddar of Frenda.

The Jedars (Arabic "walls" or "buildings") is the name given to a number of sepulchral monuments placed on hill-tops. A rectangular or square podium is in each case surmounted by a pyramid. The tombs date from the 5th to the 7th century of the Christian era, and lie in two distinct groups between Tiaret and Frenda. Frenda, which has largely preserved its old Berber character, has numerous dolmens and prehistoric rock sculptures close by.

=== Tassili n'Ajjer ===
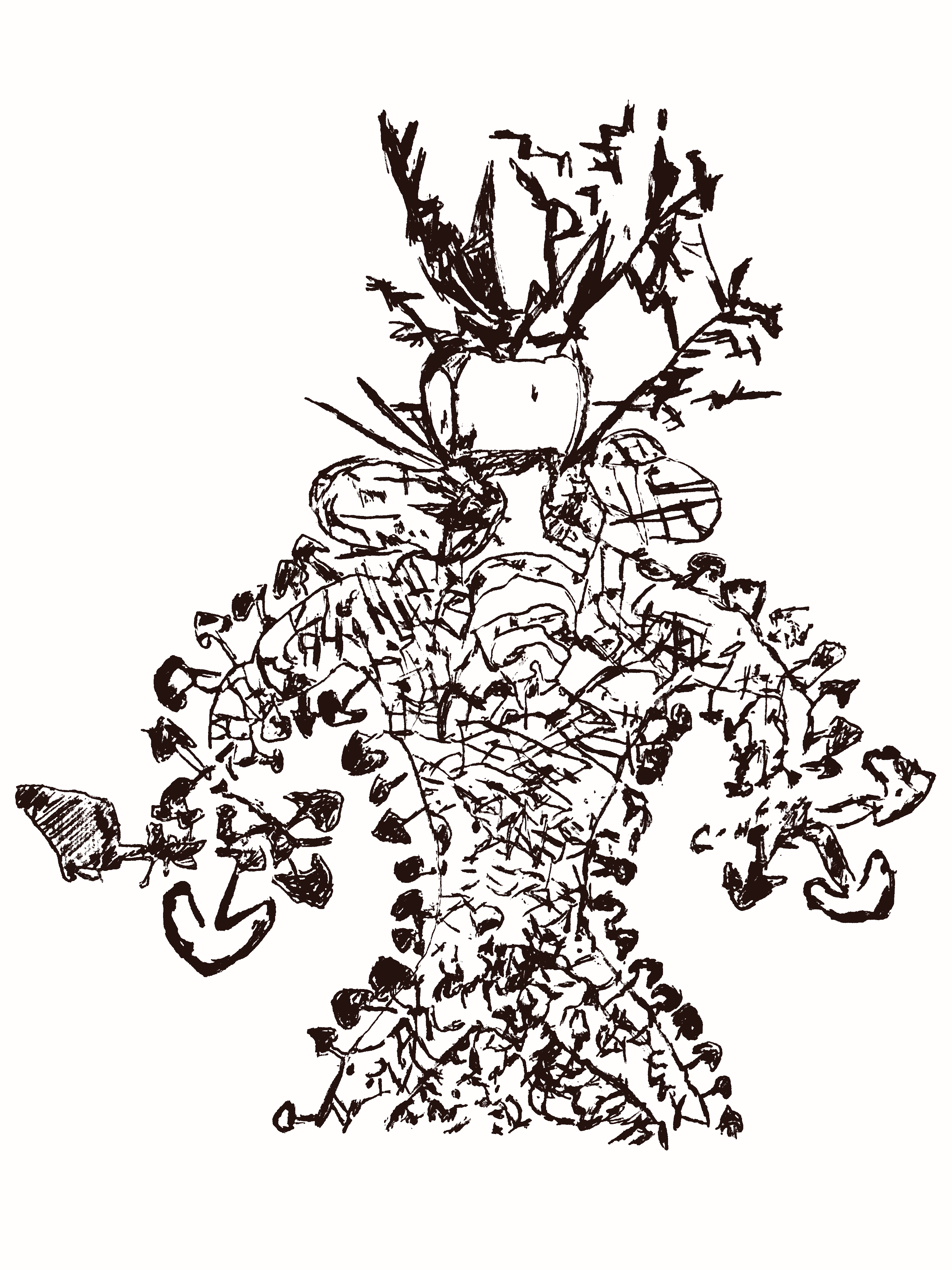
Anonymous reproduction of the Tassili mushroom man Matalem-Amazar found in Tassili.

Tassili n'Ajjer is a national park in the Sahara desert, located on a vast plateau in south-east Algeria, covering an area of over 72,000 km^{2} (28,000 sq mi). It has one of the most important groupings of prehistoric cave art in the world, and was inducted into UNESCO's World Heritage Site list in 1982.

Tassili n'Ajjer is known in the New Age culture for its Fungoid rock art, the primitive yet elaborate drawings of psychedelic mushrooms that hints on a shamanic consumption of those plants by the native people of this land.

=== Other sites ===
- Lambaesis
- Tebessa
- Tipasa
- Timgad (the Pompeii of Africa)
- Thubursicum (Thubursicum): Well-preserved Roman theater
- Beni Hammad Fort (contains second oldest minaret in the country)

== Recent discoveries ==
In 2009, when the Place des Martyrs in Algiers was closed to build the subway station, Algerian and French archeologists found a 5th-century (Christian) basilica below layers of concrete.

In November 2018, archeologists in Algeria announced the discovery, on the site of Ain Boucherit near Sétif, of what seems to be stone tools (similar to Oldowans) and cut animal bones dated back to 2.4 million years old. This discovery turned Ain Boucherit into the oldest human site known today, and shook the theory of East Africa being the cradle of humanity.

== See also ==
- Prehistory of Central North Africa
