= Archaeology of Brazil =

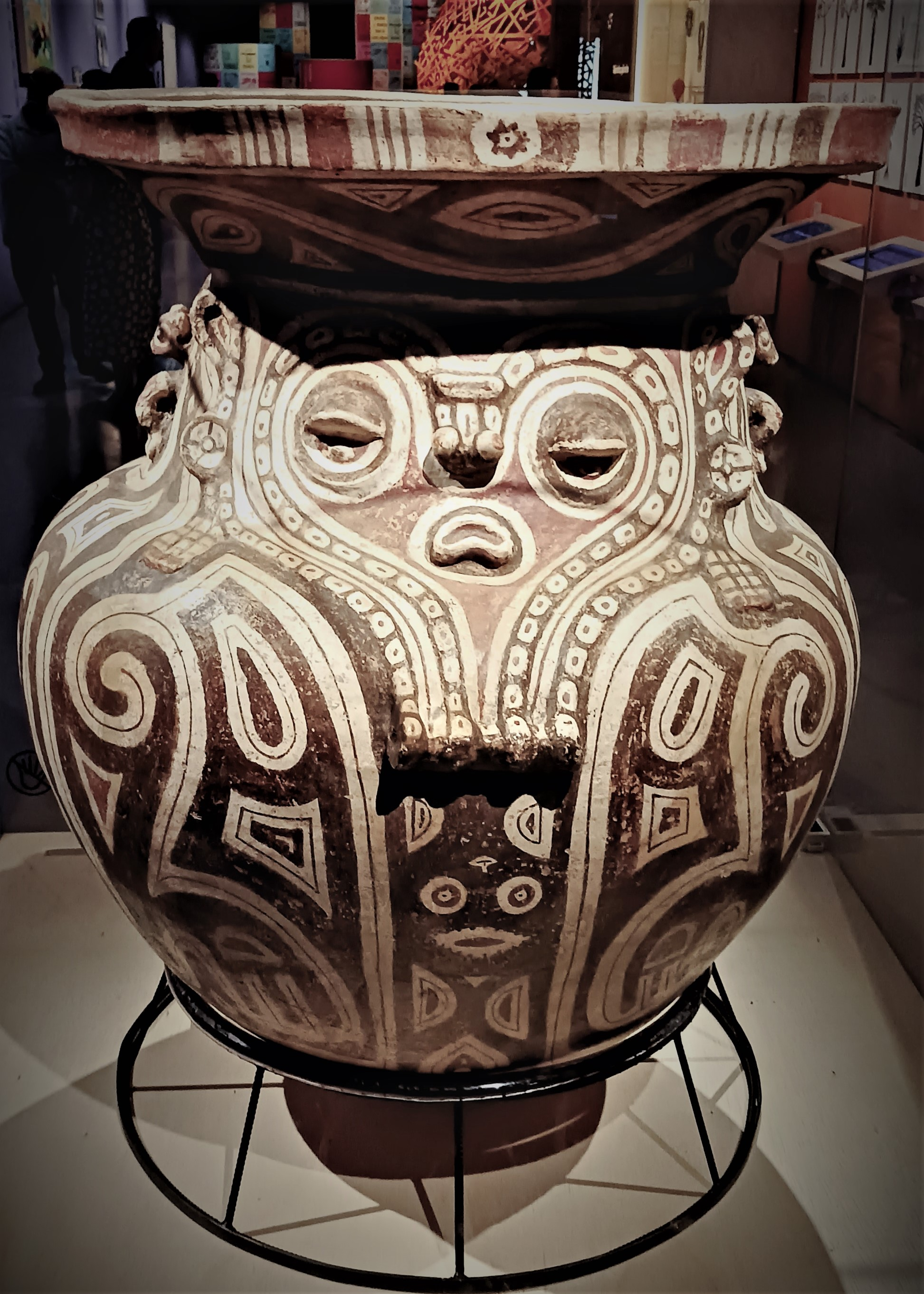
Funerary urn of the Marajoara culture

Brazilian archeology is a work perspective within Archaeology that aims to work with the specific problems and conditions of archeology in Brazil. Brazilian archeology proposes to combat Eurocentrism in the scientific production of the area in the country, seeking to rescue and preserve the Brazilian archaeological heritage. This perspective also began to work academically in the country through the expansion of archeology work, which used to be very concentrated in the South and Southeast regions, and which began to work throughout the country through training and performance centers in Brazilian universities.

There are several reasons for archaeology in Brazil has failed to integrate into a most prominent Latin American or worldwide context. Brazil has a large size of the territory, lacks government support, has tropical environments, lacks of monumental architecture, and Brazil's being Portuguese-speaking country; therefore, with all these factors combined, it was and still is difficult to form a well-structured Brazilian archeology.

== History ==
Archeology can trace its intellectual trajectory from the 15th and 16th centuries, in the context of antiquarianism and Classicism, through the 18th century Enlightenment and emerging as a scientific discipline in the early 19th century.

In Brazil, this development has taken place since the 19th century, since the passage from the Empire to the Republic, when people thought about the construction of national ideals, in addition to the discourses constructed to discover the origin and social organization of the Brazilian indigenous groups. Currently, Brazilian archeology is increasingly turning to indigenous societies.

The history of archaeology in Brazil has been divided into seven periods:

- Colonial period from 1500 to 1822.
- Brazilian empire from 1822 to 1889
- Republic period from 1889 to 1920
- Formative or Modern period from 1920 to 1949
- Inception of university research period from 1950 to 1964
- Dictatorial military period from 1964 to 1985
- Democratic and pluralist archaeology from 1985 to present time.
