= Fincha Habera, Ethiopia =

Middle Stone Age archeological site in southern Ethiopia

Fincha Habera is a Middle Stone Age archaeological site located within the Bale Mountains in southern Ethiopia. The rock shelter is located within the largest alpine ecosystem in Africa and is especially notable for the high altitude of the shelter and archaeological site, lying about 4,000 metres (13,000 ft) above sea level, between the Harcha and Wasama Valleys. During the Late Pleistocene, the Fincha Habera rock shelter was occupied by hunter-gatherers and the site now provides evidence for one of the oldest human occupancies at high-altitudes. The surrounding glacial climate provided conditions of fresh water, vegetation, and sustenance that created a unique environment that allowed these hunter-gatherers to find longer term residence at this shelter.

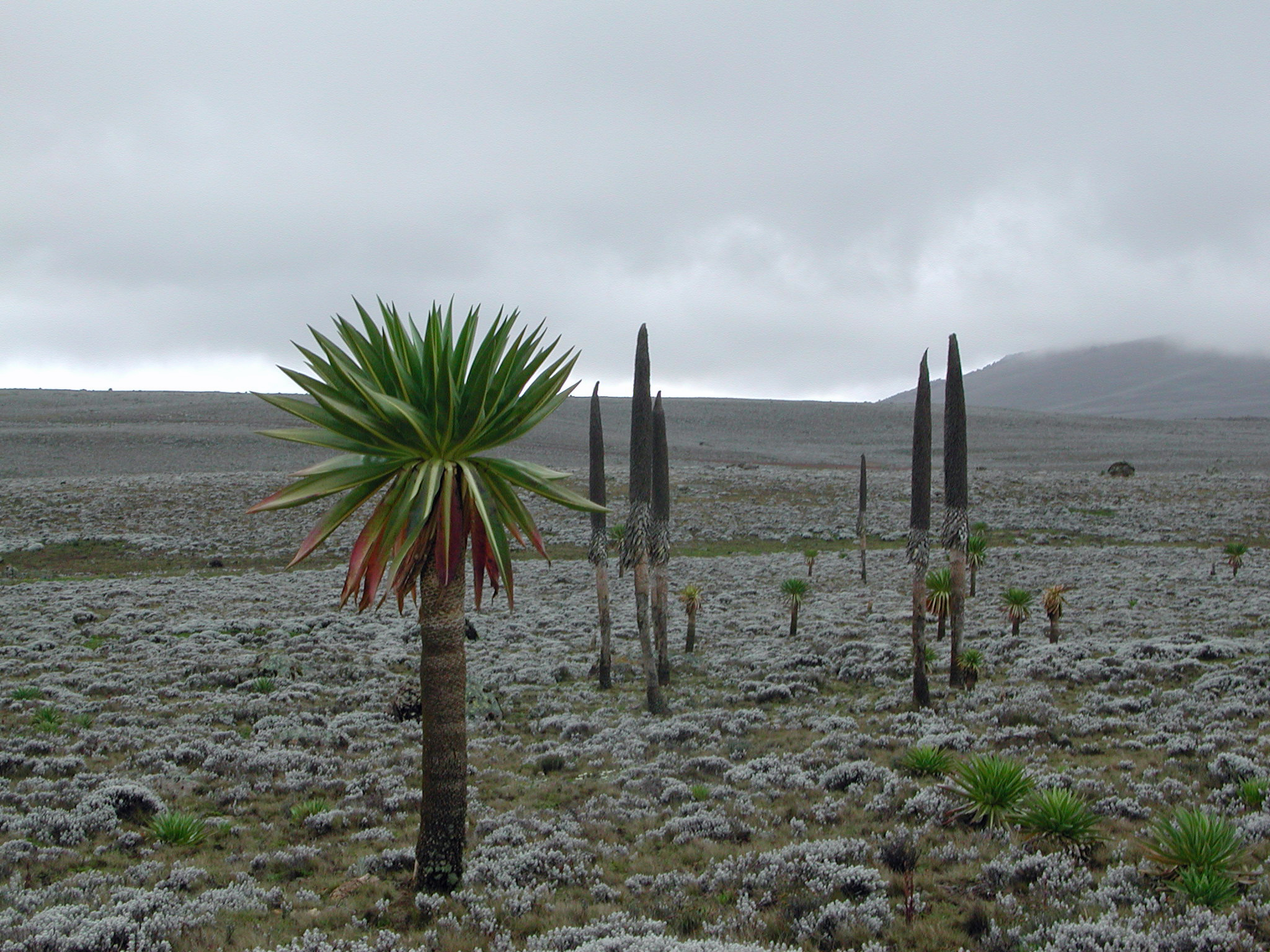
Bale Mountain National Park, Ethiopia, 2003

== Paleoenvironmental influences ==
=== Glacial periods ===
The Bale Mountains faced long glaciation periods, creating an Afro-alpine climate and ecosystem. Glaciation periods were categorized by Glacial stages I, II, and III throughout the MSA. The first glacial stage, approximately occurring between 48,000 and 42,000 years ago, occurred during a wet and cold climate period in Eastern Africa that followed an arid ecosystem. Advancements of valley glaciers during this stage, corroborated with the specific climate, created a scenario in which glaciers advancing throughout the valley led to ice flow down multiple outlet glaciers. These outlets subsequently acted as sources of fresh water to MSA hunter-gatherers at Fincha Habera after the ice melted in the tropics and was drained throughout the nearby Web Valley. The second and third glacial stages continued this trend and created a stable environment for the Fincha Habera settlement that was categorized by cold, humid ecosystems.

Although glaciers advanced and surrounded the area around Fincha Habera, they never made contact with the settlement. The rock shelter was approximately 500 to 700 meters below land levels in which the glaciers were found. Thus, more moderate climates allowed Fincha Habera to be suitable for habitation by gatherers multiple times throughout the MSA and provided refuge against arid climates in the lowlands.

=== Post-glacial periods ===
Systems for water drainage have been found to exist far past the third glacial stage, suggesting a climate or ecosystem that managed to preserve fresh water past the need for melting ice caps. Heavy presence of a ground beetle species found at the site and phylogenetically dated much after the end glacial stage III also pointed to the existence of humid, rich organic matter soil conditions that corroborated the availability of fresh water to foragers at Fincha Habera.

Studies of increased Podocarpus and Ericaceae pollen within dung deposits at the Fincha Habera site indicate the appearance of vegetation belts along the Bale Mountains. This suggests that gallery forests would have appeared near Fincha Habera in the drier periods of the MSA, colliding with the third glacial period that created fresh water sources and water drainage systems, as well as providing a habitat for prey of hunter-gatherers residing at the shelter.

== History ==
=== Site construction ===
Deposits from conglomerate rock that formed between flows of basalt lava helped form the actual rock shelter. Both hearth remains and specifically placed boulder piles at the entrance of the archaeological site interpreted to be for livestock enclosures were discovered at the archaeological sites. Other features of the settlement included methods of storage and disposal of organic resources and waste, as well as fire pits and areas for food preparation.

=== Past settlements ===
Deposits from the archaeological site suggest that hunter-gatherers occupied the rock shelter during the Late Pleistocene, likely between 47,000 and 31,000 years ago, using technology attributed to the Middle Stone Age. Although the occupation existed at a high altitude, the alpine ecosystem within the Bale Mountains allowed the inhabitants of Fincha Habera to have access to sustainable food and living resources without need for heavy physical strain. Because of these factors, the rock settlement likely was home to longer-term stays, providing methods of subsistence to inhabitants all year-round. However, while long-term settlements likely occurred at Fincha Habera, it is still undetermined if permanent residence occurred and no additional human residential sites of the same age have been identified near the settlement. The Fincha Habera hunter-gatherers also utilized hearths throughout the period of inhabitance and livestock enclosures during the later period of time.

== Occupation ==
=== Methods of subsistence ===
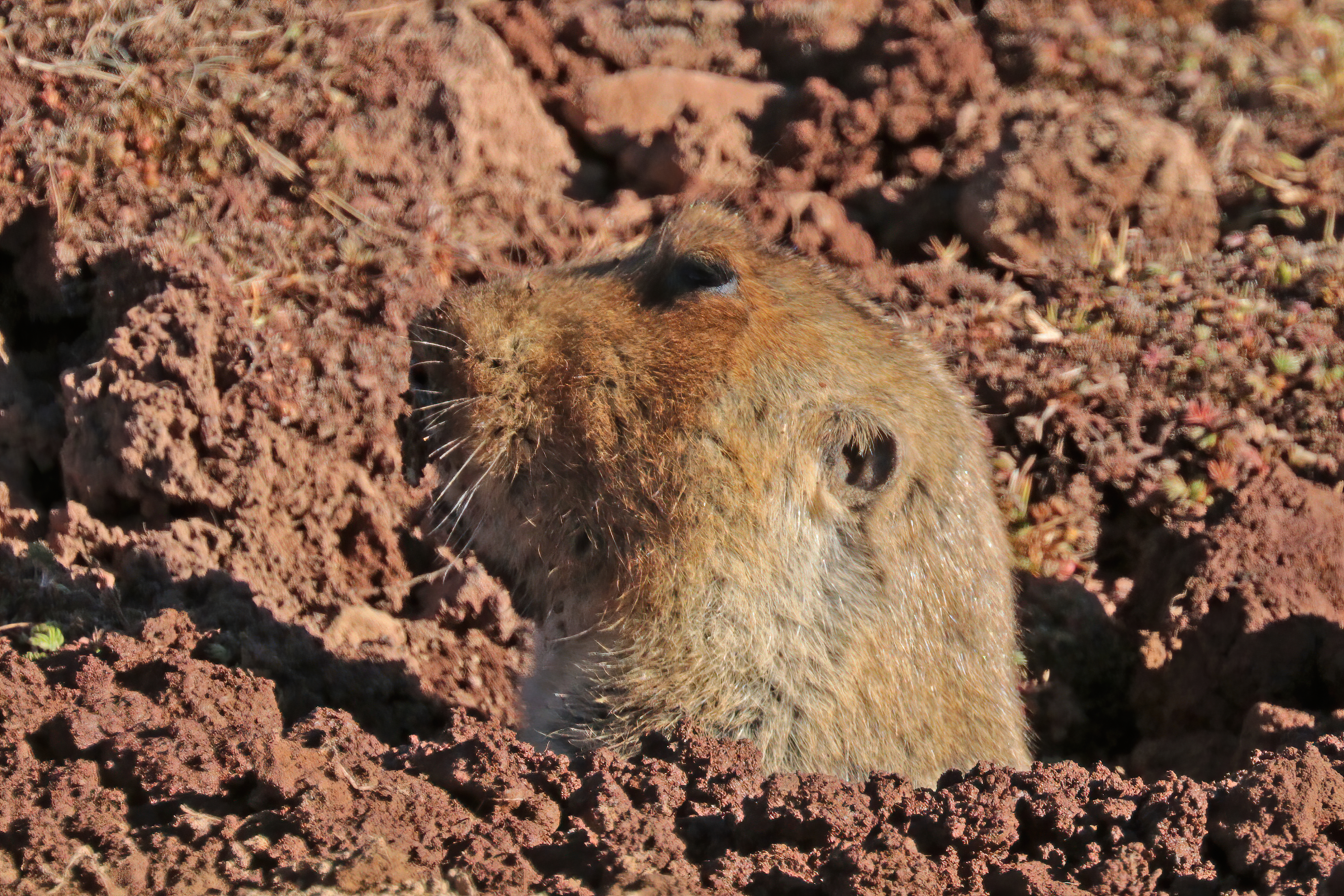
Giant mole-rat, (Tachyoryctes macrocephalus), Sanetti Plateau, Ethiopia

The diet of hunter-gatherers at Fincha Habera heavily relied on the endemic giant mole rats found in the Afro-alpine ecosystems. These mole-rats were densely populated near the rock shelter, with around 29 individuals appearing per hectare in the surrounding geographical area and constituted 93.5% of the area's fauna. As such, they were heavily hunted by Fincha Habera residents. Throughout the archaeological site, evidence of burn marks and burnt bones of these mole rate in early MSA deposits indicated that the method of preparation for food was roasting, but at a low degree of heat. Despite the name giant mole rat, the prey were likely small in size. The smaller scale of these animals help explain the lack of cut marks made by hunter-gatherers on the left-over bones at the site, since harsh butchering was not needed to prepare the rats for consumption. Instead, the residents might have used smoke to push these animals outside of their tunnels to hunt them.

Such a method of preparation and hunting found at the site was not an individual case - in fact, the same pattern of hunting and consuming rodents is documented around tropical geographical sites globally. The method of small fauna exploitation is also very similar with lifestyles of hunter-gatherers located in Southern Africa during both the Middle Stone Age and Late Stone Age. One resembling case of low-heat roasting and preparation is that of MSA bird exploitation at the archaeological site Sibudu Cave.

Other fauna apparent at Fincha Habera, and perhaps integrated into the diet of the prehistoric residents there, included mountain nyala (an endemic bovid to the Afro-alpines), baboons, and small carnivores like foxes. Hyenas were also heavily present near the rock shelter during the MSA and competed with hunter-gatherers for the giant mole rats as a food source.

=== Obsidian tools ===
Tools by the inhabitants of Fincha Habera were primarily made of obsidian. Five obsidian outcrops were located at around 4200 meters above sea level in the Ethiopian highlands and Bale Mountains. These outcrops were the sites of extensive human extractions of obsidian for resources and raw materials. As such, obsidian was the primary raw material that made up almost all of the lithic tools found at Fincha Habera's rock shelter.

The MSA stone tool assembly at Fincha Habera included primarily unifacial tools with retouched points and blades. Creation of such tools likely included a reduction sequence that used two perpendicular platforms to create unipolar cores. Additionally, modifications of the lithic tools at the site included basal thinning and alternate edge retouch, both of which were common for MSA stone tools at the time. Scrapers and points were also utilized. Throughout the site, a high number of unworked or barely worked-on nodules for cores were found - such an upward count of tested-on nodules signifies resource predictability, especially with obsidian.
