= Pre-Columbian Jamaica =

Around 650 AD, Jamaica was settled by the people of the Ostionoid culture, who likely came from South America. Alligator Pond in Manchester Parish and Little River in St. Ann Parish are among the earliest known sites of this Ostionoid culture, also known as the Redware culture. These people lived near the coast and extensively hunted turtles and fish.

Around 950 AD, the people of the Meillacan culture settled on both the coast and the interior of Jamaica, either absorbing the Redware culture or co-inhabiting the island with them.

The Taíno culture developed on Jamaica around 1200 AD. They brought from South America a system of raising yuca known as "conuco." To add nutrients to the soil, the Taíno burned local bushes and trees and heaped the ash into large mounds, into which they then planted yuca cuttings.

Taíno society was divided into two classes: naborias (commoners) and mitaínos (nobles). These were governed by chiefs known as caciques (who were male), who were advised by priests/healers known as bohiques. Caciques enjoyed the privilege of wearing golden pendants called guanín and sitting on wooden stools to be above the guests they received. Bohiques were extolled for their healing powers and ability to speak with gods.

The Taíno had a matrilineal system of kinship, descent and inheritance. When a male heir was not present, the inheritance or succession would go to the oldest male child of the deceased's sister. The Taíno had avunculocal post-marital residence, meaning a newly married couple lived in the household of the maternal uncle. He was more important in the lives of his niece's children than their biological father; the uncle introduced the boys to men's societies.

Most Taíno lived in large circular buildings (bohios), constructed with wooden poles, woven straw, and palm leaves. These houses, built surrounding the central plaza, could hold 10–15 families each. The cacique and his family lived in rectangular buildings (caney) of similar construction, with wooden porches. Taíno home furnishings included cotton hammocks (hamaca), sleeping and sitting mats made of palms, wooden chairs (dujo or duho) with woven seats, platforms, and cradles for children.

The Taíno played a ceremonial ball game called batey. Opposing teams had 10 to 30 players per team and used a solid rubber ball. Normally, the teams were composed of men, but occasionally women played the game as well. The games were often played on courts in the village's center plaza and are believed to have been used for conflict resolution between communities. The most elaborate ball courts are found at chiefdoms' boundaries. Often, chiefs made wagers on the possible outcome of a game.

Taino spoke an Arawakan language and did not have writing. Some of the words used by them, such as barbacoa ("barbecue"), hamaca ("hammock"), kanoa ("canoe"), tabaco ("tobacco"), yuca, batata ("sweet potato"), and juracán ("hurricane"), have been incorporated into Spanish and English.

== Gallery ==
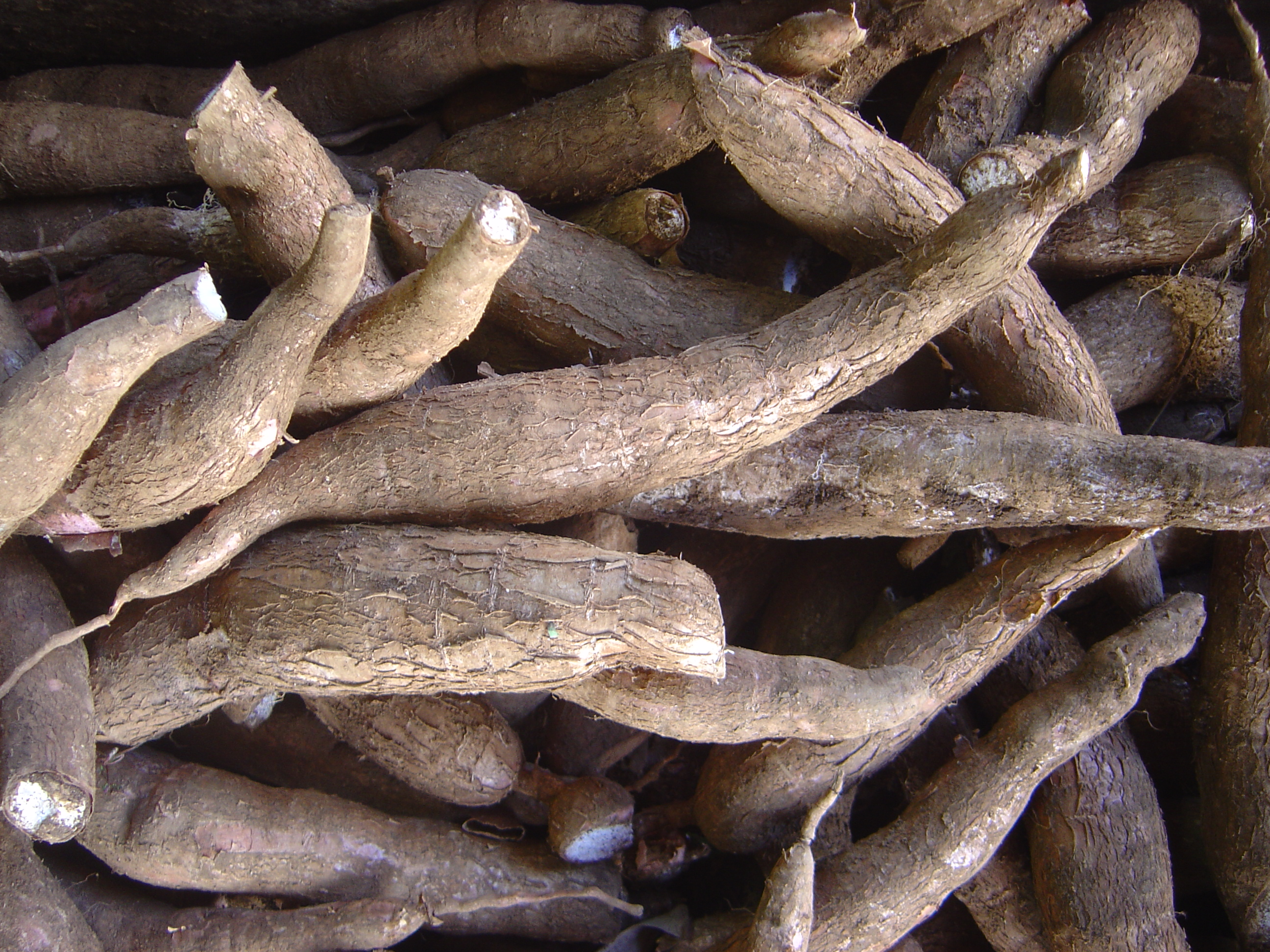
Cassava (yuca) roots, the Taínos' main crop

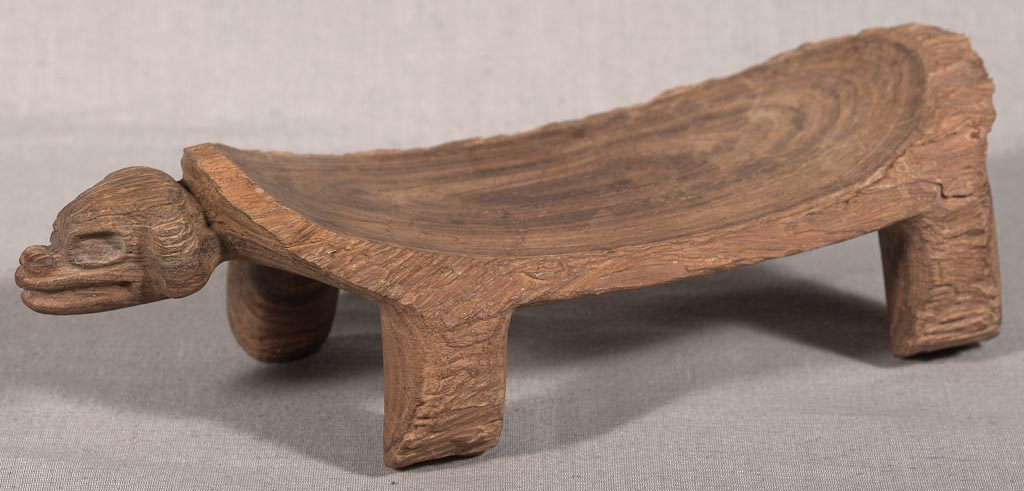
Dujo, a wooden chair crafted by Taínos.

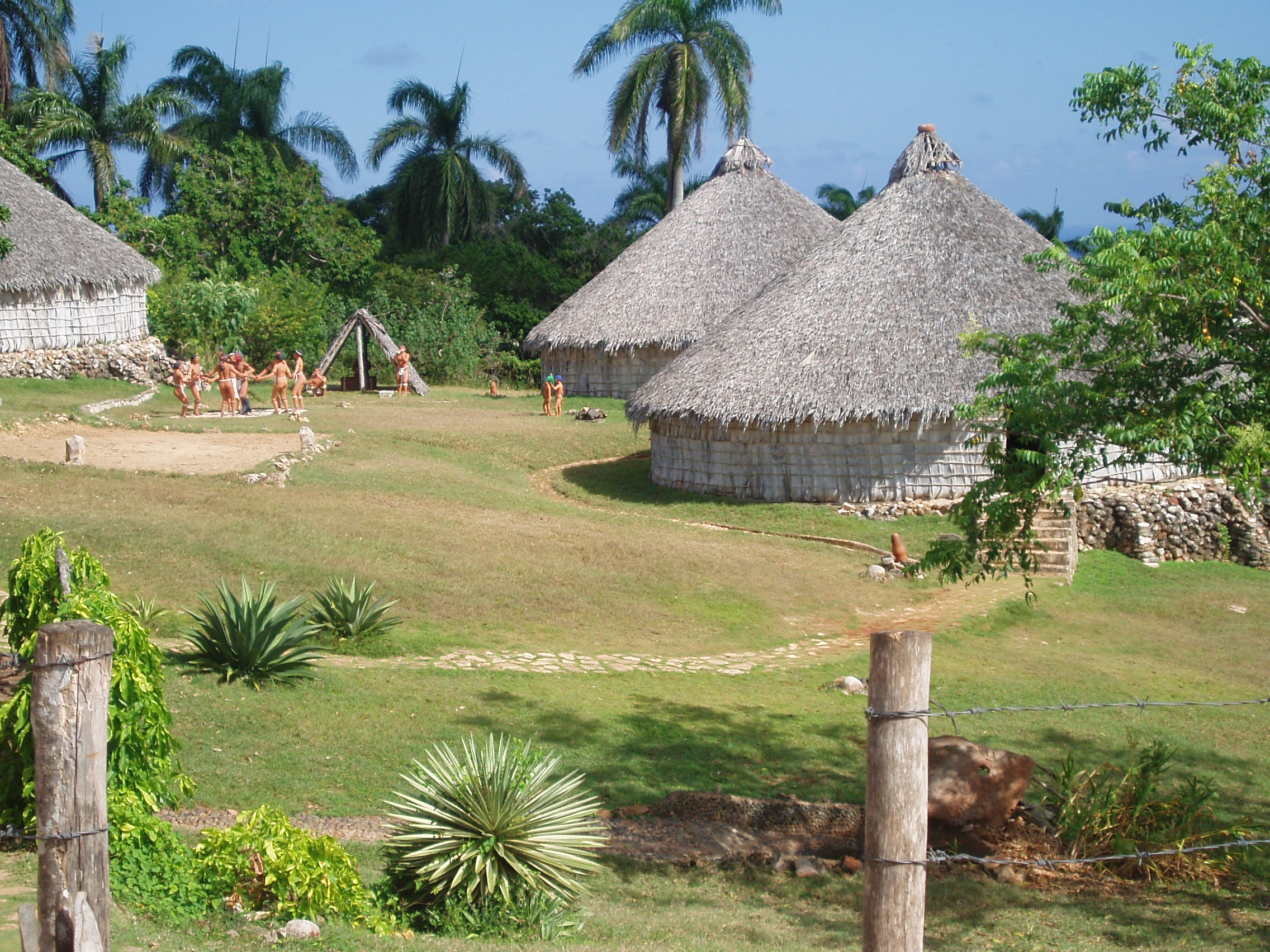
Reconstruction of a Taíno village in Cuba

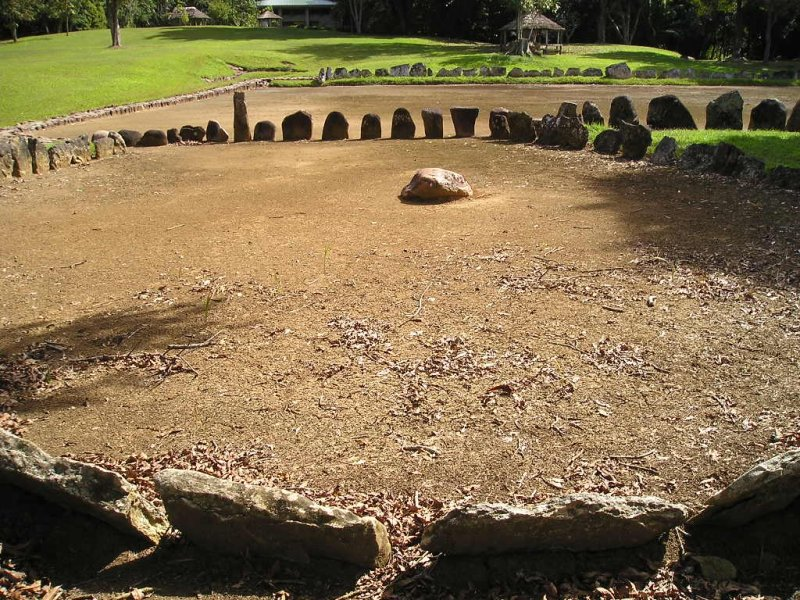
Caguana ceremonial ball court (batey), outlined with stones

== Bibliography ==
- Anglería, Pedro Mártir de (1949). Décadas del Nuevo Mundo (in Spanish). Buenos Aires: Editorial Bajel.
- Atkinson, Lesley-Gail (2006). The Earliest Inhabitants: The Dynamics of the Jamaican Taíno. University of the West Indies Press. ISBN 9-7664-0149-7.
- Rogoziński, Jan (1999). A Brief History of the Caribbean (Revised ed.). New York, N.Y.: Facts On File. ISBN 0-8160-3811-2 – via Internet Archive.
- Rouse, Irving (1992). The Tainos : rise & decline of the people who greeted Columbus. New Haven: Yale University Press. ISBN 0-3000-5696-6 – via Internet Archive..
