= Carabus marietti marietti =

Scientific classification
- Kingdom: Animalia
- Phylum: Arthropoda
- Class: Insecta
- Order: Coleoptera
- Suborder: Adephaga
- Family: Carabidae
- Genus: Carabus
- Species: C. marietti
- Subspecies: C. m. marietti

Trinomial name
- Carabus marietti marietti Cristoforis & Jan, 1837

Synonyms
- Carabus ativsengueni Schweiger, 1962; Carabus petrovitzi Mandl, 1964; Carabus pseudomarietti Schweiger, 1964; Carabus charetianus Auvray, 1992

Subspecies of beetles

Carabus marietti marietti is a subspecies in the beetle family Carabidae. It is found in Bulgaria and Turkey.
