= Library of the Civic Museum of Natural History of Milan =

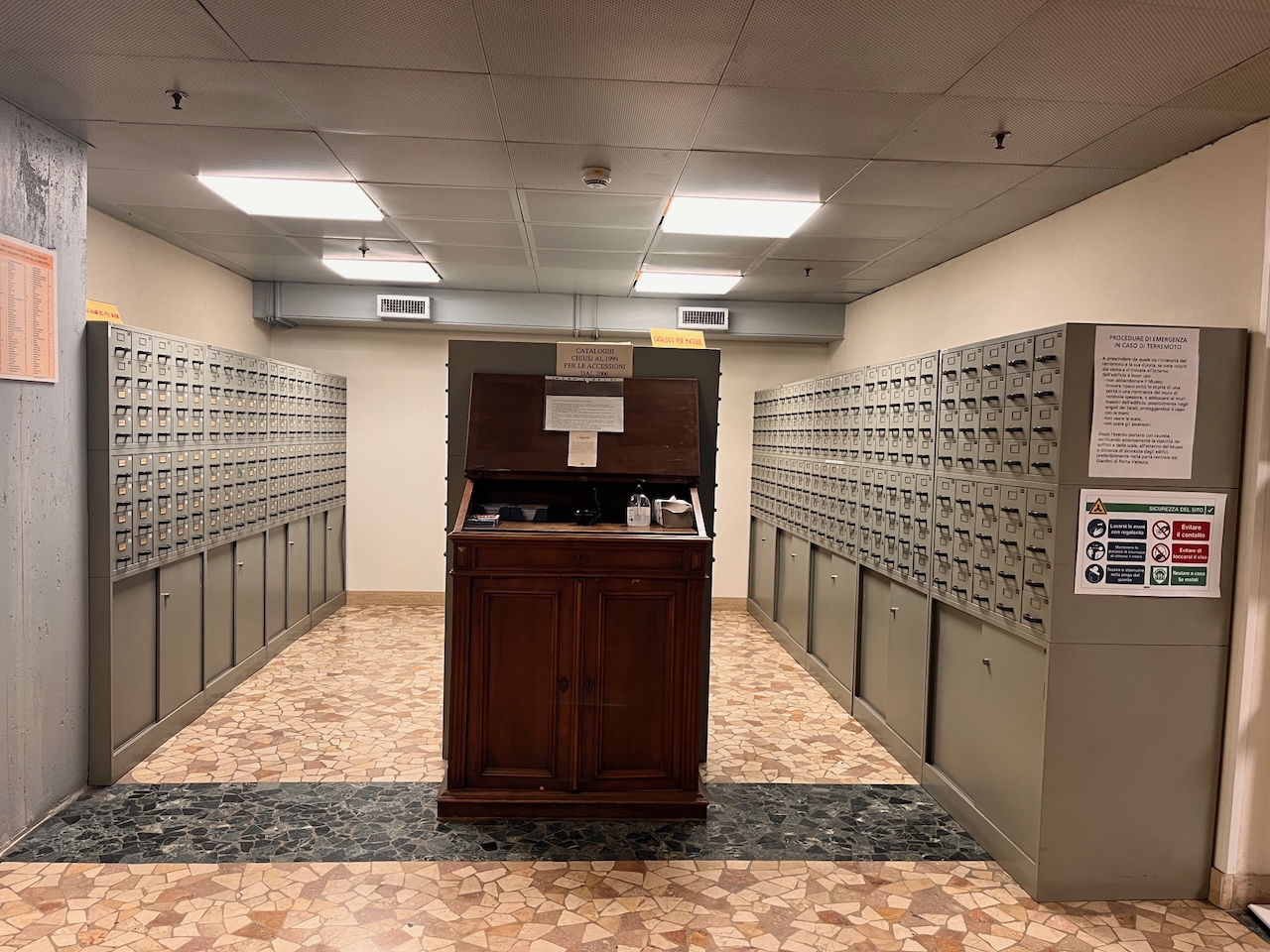
View of the library

The Library of the Civic Museum of Natural History of Milan was founded together with the Museum in 1838 and it took the collections of Georg Jan and Giuseppe De Cristoforis, and it's the biggest library on natural sciences in Italy.

It was soon enlarged by the books inherited by naturalist Carlo Porro, who died during the Five Days of Milan, on malacology, and by Choleoptera expert Carlo Bassi. In 1883 the late director of the Museum Emilio Cornalia left his library to the Museum's one, which enlarged it by 1500 volumes and 4500 pamphlets.

When in 1913 the Mineralogy Museum Borromeo was joined to the Civic Museum, it took its library. In 1981, the library of the Civic Planetarium "Ulrico Hoepli" was absorbed and then in 2015, the library in the Civic Aquarium of Milan had the same fate.
