= Carabus marietti =

Scientific classification
- Kingdom: Animalia
- Phylum: Arthropoda
- Class: Insecta
- Order: Coleoptera
- Suborder: Adephaga
- Family: Carabidae
- Genus: Carabus
- Species: C. marietti

Binomial name
- Carabus marietti De Cristoforis & Jan, 1837

Species of beetle

Carabus marietti is a species of ground beetle in the Carabinae subfamily that can be found in Bulgaria, the European part of Turkey, and the Near East.

== Subspecies ==
These subspecies belong to the species Carabus marietti:

- Carabus marietti akensiculus Cavazzuti, 2006
- Carabus marietti akensis Haury, 1889
- Carabus marietti ativsengueni Schweiger, 1962
- Carabus marietti balboi Cavazzuti, 2005
- Carabus marietti bischoffi Chaudoir, 1848
- Carabus marietti charetianus Auvray, 1992
- Carabus marietti delmastroi Cavazzuti, 2003
- Carabus marietti hroni Deuve, 1997
- Carabus marietti inexpectatus Basquin & Darge, 1987
- Carabus marietti mariettii Cristoforis & Jan, 1837
- Carabus marietti mouthiezi Lassalle, 1991
- Carabus marietti muchei Breuning, 1961
- Carabus marietti necopinatus Basquin & Darge, 1987
- Carabus marietti ormanensis Blumenthal & Breuning, 1967
- Carabus marietti ornatus Heinz, 1976
- Carabus marietti sapancaensis Blumenthal & Breuning, 1967
- Carabus marietti stefaniruspolii Breuning, 1966
- Carabus marietti terahci Charet, 1994
