= Cristofoli =

Cristofoli is an Italian surname. Notable people with the surname include:

- Franceso Cristofoli (born 1932), Danish-Italian Conductor
- Ed Cristofoli (born 1967), Canadian ice hockey player
- Nada Cristofoli (born 1971), Italian cyclist

== See also ==
- Cristofali
- Cristofori (disambiguation)
