= De Cristoforis =

De Cristoforis is an Italian surname. Notable people with the name include:

- Giuseppe De Cristoforis, Italian naturalist and collector
- Tommaso De Cristoforis, Italian Lieutenant Colonel

== See also ==
- Cristofori (surname)
