= Cristofer =

Cristofer is the Spanish spelling of the English language name Christopher. Because this is a non-Spanish name/word, the spelling rules in Spanish are usually not followed. However, it is not uncommon to find this name spelled Crístofer to ensure it is properly pronounced. The Spanish language equivalent of Christopher is Cristóbal.

"Cristofer" can also be a Latin spelling of the name "Christopher."

== People ==
- Cristofer Soto, Peruvian footballer
- Cristofer Suárez, Ecuadorian footballer
- John Cristofer Valladares, Chilean footballer
