= Cristofori (disambiguation) =

Bartolomeo Cristofori (1655–1731) was an Italian maker of musical instruments, famous for inventing the piano.

Cristofori may also refer to:

- Cristofori (surname), Italian surname
- Cristofori school, educational institution Kindergarten-3rd grade for the Living Enrichment Center, a New Thought organization

== See also ==
- Cristofali, Italian surname
- Cristofoli, Italian surname
- Cristofori's Dream, album by David Lanz
- Cristoforia, synonym for Strongygaster, genus of flies
