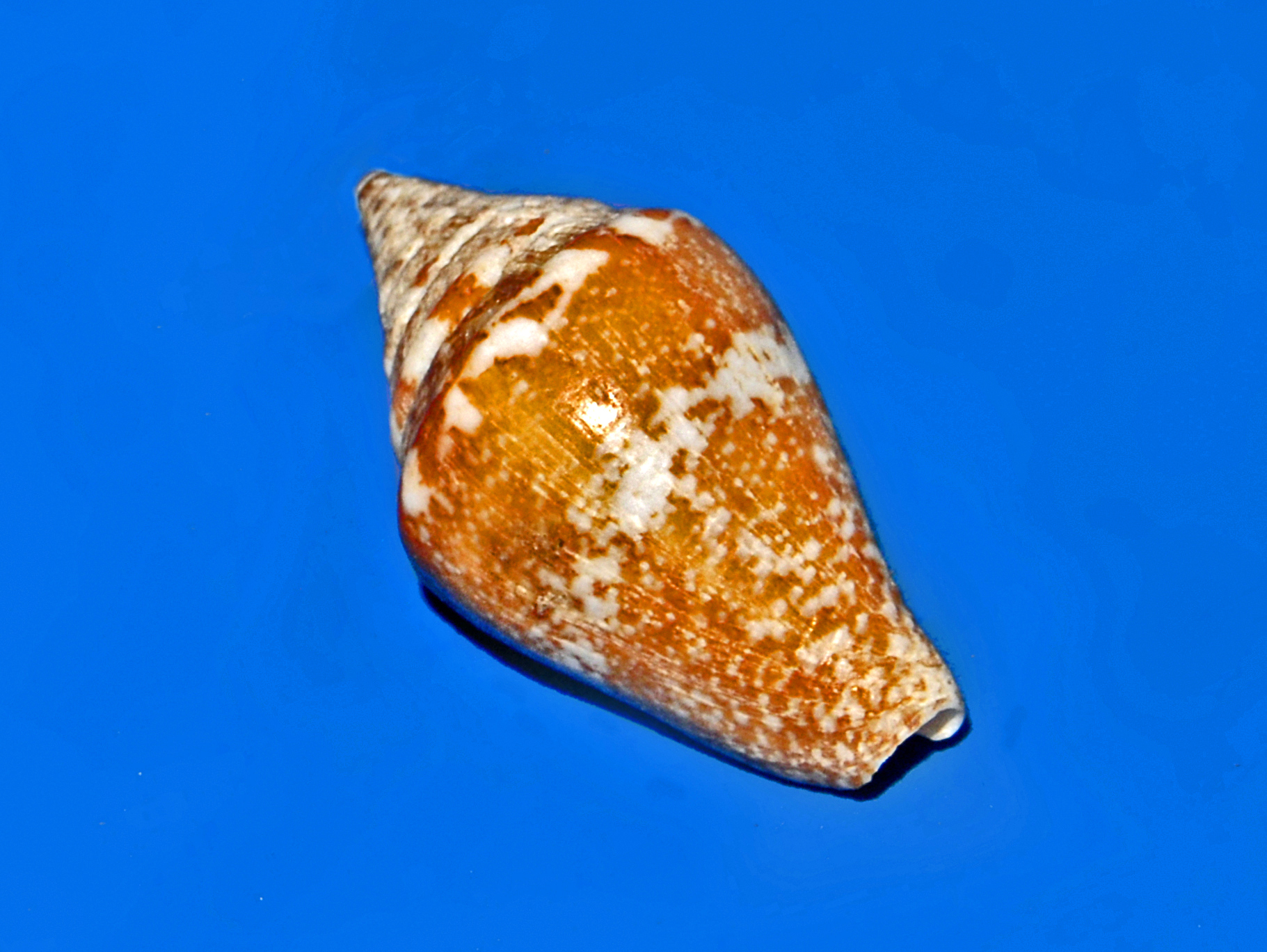
- Shell of Parametaria dupontii from Mexico, on display at the Museo Civico di Storia Naturale di Milano

Scientific classification
- Kingdom: Animalia
- Phylum: Mollusca
- Class: Gastropoda
- Subclass: Caenogastropoda
- Order: Neogastropoda
- Family: Columbellidae
- Genus: Parametaria
- Species: P. dupontii

Binomial name
- Parametaria dupontii Kiener, 1845

Synonyms
- Conus concinnulus Crosse, 1858; Conus concinnus Broderip, 1833; Conus dupontii Kiener, 1845

= Parametaria dupontii =

Species of gastropod

Parametaria dupontii, the Dupont's dove shell or false cone, is a species of sea snail, a marine gastropod mollusc in the family Columbellidae, the dove snails.

== Description ==
Shells of Parametaria dupontii can reach a length of about 13–28 millimetres (0.51–1.10 in).

== Distribution ==
This species can be found in Gulf of California and in Pacific Mexico.
