= Abbondio Sangiorgio =

Italian sculptor (1798–1879)

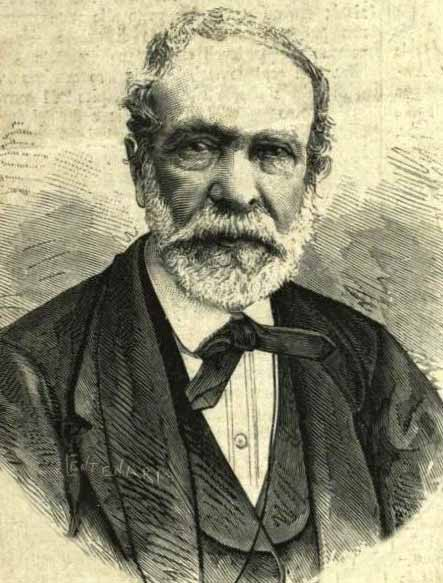
Abbondio Sangiorgio

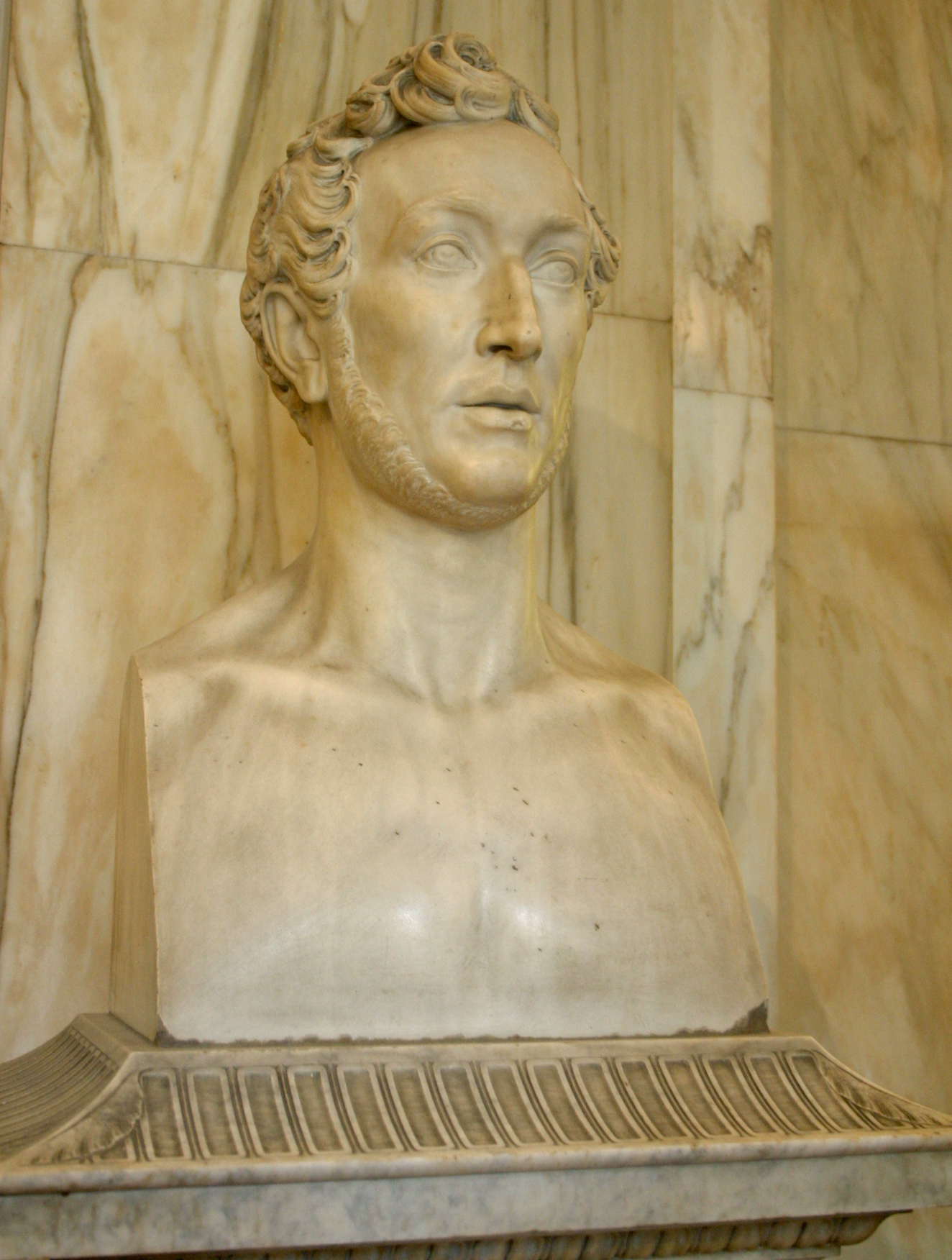
Portrait bust of Giuseppe De Cristoforis

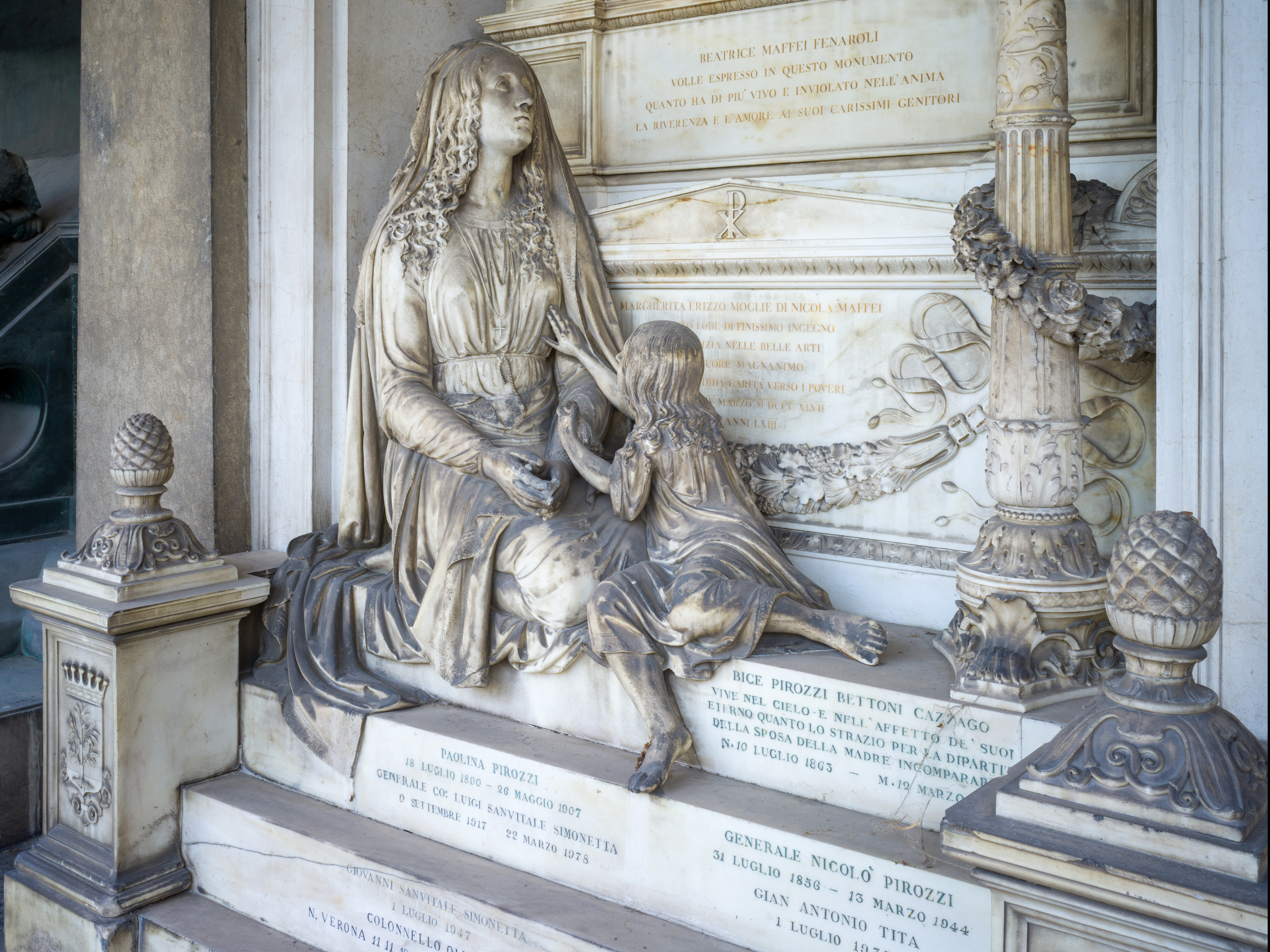
Funerary monument of the Maffei Erizzo family by Abbondio Sangiorgio AD 1848 in the Monumental cemetery of Brescia.

Abbondio Sangiorgio (16 July 1798 – 2 November 1879) was an Italian sculptor of the neoclassical period.

== Biography ==
Born in Milan, Sangiorgio studied at the city's Accademia di Brera. During his early career he worked for the Fabbrica del Duomo di Milano; later he received numerous commissions for large public sculptures in places including Turin (a Castor and Pollux for the Palazzo Reale), Milan, Brescia and Casale Monferrato (an equestrian portrait of Charles Albert of Piedmont-Sardinia). He also produced a large number of portrait sculptures in which he was able to express a predilection for realism over neoclassicism.

Among Sangiorgio's students was Pietro Magni.
