= Cristofali =

Cristofali is an Italian surname. Notable people with the surname include:

- Adriano Cristofali (1717–1788), Veronese architect, whose style bridged between Enlightenment-Baroque and Neoclassicism
- Bartolomeo Cristofori (1655–1731), Italian maker of musical instruments, inventor of piano

== See also ==
- Cristóbal (disambiguation)
- Cristofori (disambiguation)
