= Carabus marietti hroni =

Scientific classification
- Kingdom: Animalia
- Phylum: Arthropoda
- Class: Insecta
- Order: Coleoptera
- Suborder: Adephaga
- Family: Carabidae
- Genus: Carabus
- Species: C. marietti
- Subspecies: C. m. hroni

Trinomial name
- Carabus marietti hroni Deuve, 1997

Subspecies of beetle

Carabus marietti hroni is a subspecies of ground beetle in the Carabinae subfamily that is endemic to Turkey.
