= Carabus marietti necopinatus =

Scientific classification
- Kingdom: Animalia
- Phylum: Arthropoda
- Class: Insecta
- Order: Coleoptera
- Suborder: Adephaga
- Family: Carabidae
- Genus: Carabus
- Species: C. marietti
- Subspecies: C. m. necopinatus

Trinomial name
- Carabus marietti necopinatus Basquin & Darge, 1986

Subspecies of beetle

Carabus marietti bischoffi is a subspecies of ground beetle from Carabinae subfamily that is endemic to Turkey. The subspecies are either brown or green coloured.
