= Carabus marietti bischoffi =

Scientific classification
- Kingdom: Animalia
- Phylum: Arthropoda
- Class: Insecta
- Order: Coleoptera
- Suborder: Adephaga
- Family: Carabidae
- Genus: Carabus
- Species: C. marietti
- Subspecies: C. m. bischoffi

Trinomial name
- Carabus marietti bischoffi Chaudoir, 1848

Synonyms
- Carabus kindermanni Hampe, 1852 nec Waltl, 1838; Carabus terahci Charet, 1994; Carabus delmastroi Cavazzuti, 2003

Subspecies of beetle

Carabus marietti bischoffi is a subspecies of ground beetle in the Carabinae family that is endemic to Turkey. The subspecies are either brown or green coloured.
