= Carabus marietti ornatus =

Scientific classification
- Kingdom: Animalia
- Phylum: Arthropoda
- Class: Insecta
- Order: Coleoptera
- Suborder: Adephaga
- Family: Carabidae
- Genus: Carabus
- Species: C. marietti
- Subspecies: C. m. ornatus

Trinomial name
- Carabus marietti ornatus Heinz, 1976

Synonyms
- Carabus inclarus Darge, 1994

Subspecies of beetle

Carabus marietti ornatus is a subspecies of brown-coloured ground beetle in the Carabinae subfamily that is endemic to Turkey.
