= Carabus marietti muchei =

Scientific classification
- Kingdom: Animalia
- Phylum: Arthropoda
- Class: Insecta
- Order: Coleoptera
- Suborder: Adephaga
- Family: Carabidae
- Genus: Carabus
- Species: C. marietti
- Subspecies: C. m. muchei

Trinomial name
- Carabus marietti muchei Breuning, 1961

Subspecies of beetle

Carabus marietti muchei is a subspecies of black coloured ground beetle in the Carabinae subfamily that is endemic to Turkey.
