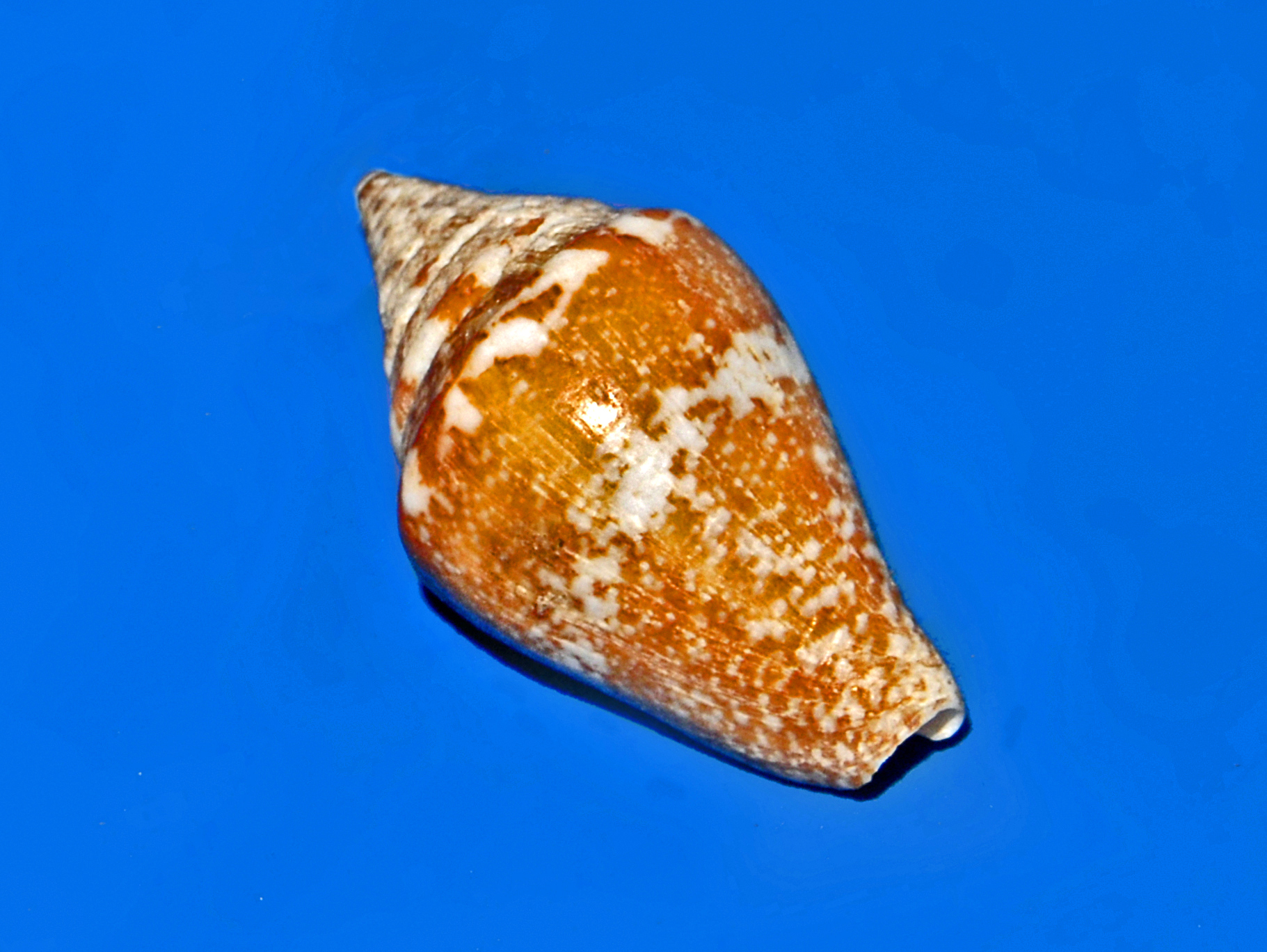
- Shell of Parametaria dupontii

Scientific classification
- Kingdom: Animalia
- Phylum: Mollusca
- Class: Gastropoda
- Subclass: Caenogastropoda
- Order: Neogastropoda
- Superfamily: Buccinoidea
- Family: Columbellidae
- Genus: Parametaria; Dall, 1916

Type species
- Conus dupontii Kiener, 1846

Synonyms
- Columbella (Meta) Reeve, 1859; Meta Reeve, 1859 (Invalid: Junior homonym of Meta Koch, 1835 [Arachnida]; Parametaria is a replacement name); † Parametaria (Dominitaria) Jung, 1994 · accepted, alternate representation; Parametaria (Parametaria) Dall, 1916· accepted, alternate representation

= Parametaria =

Genus of gastropods

Parametaria is a genus of sea snails, marine gastropod mollusks in the family Columbellidae, the dove snails.

== Species ==
Species within the genus Parametaria include:

- Parametaria barbieri K. Monsecour & D. Monsecour, 2019
- Parametaria dupontii Kiener, 1845
- Parametaria epamella P. L. Duclos, 1840
- † Parametaria islahispaniolae (Maury, 1917)
- Parametaria macrostoma (Reeve, 1859)

Species brought into synonymy

- Parametaria ledaluciae Rios & Tostes, 1981: synonym of Eurypyrene ledaluciae (Rios & Tostes, 1981)
- Parametaria philippinarum L. A. Reeve, 1843: synonym of Parametaria epamella (Duclos, 1840)
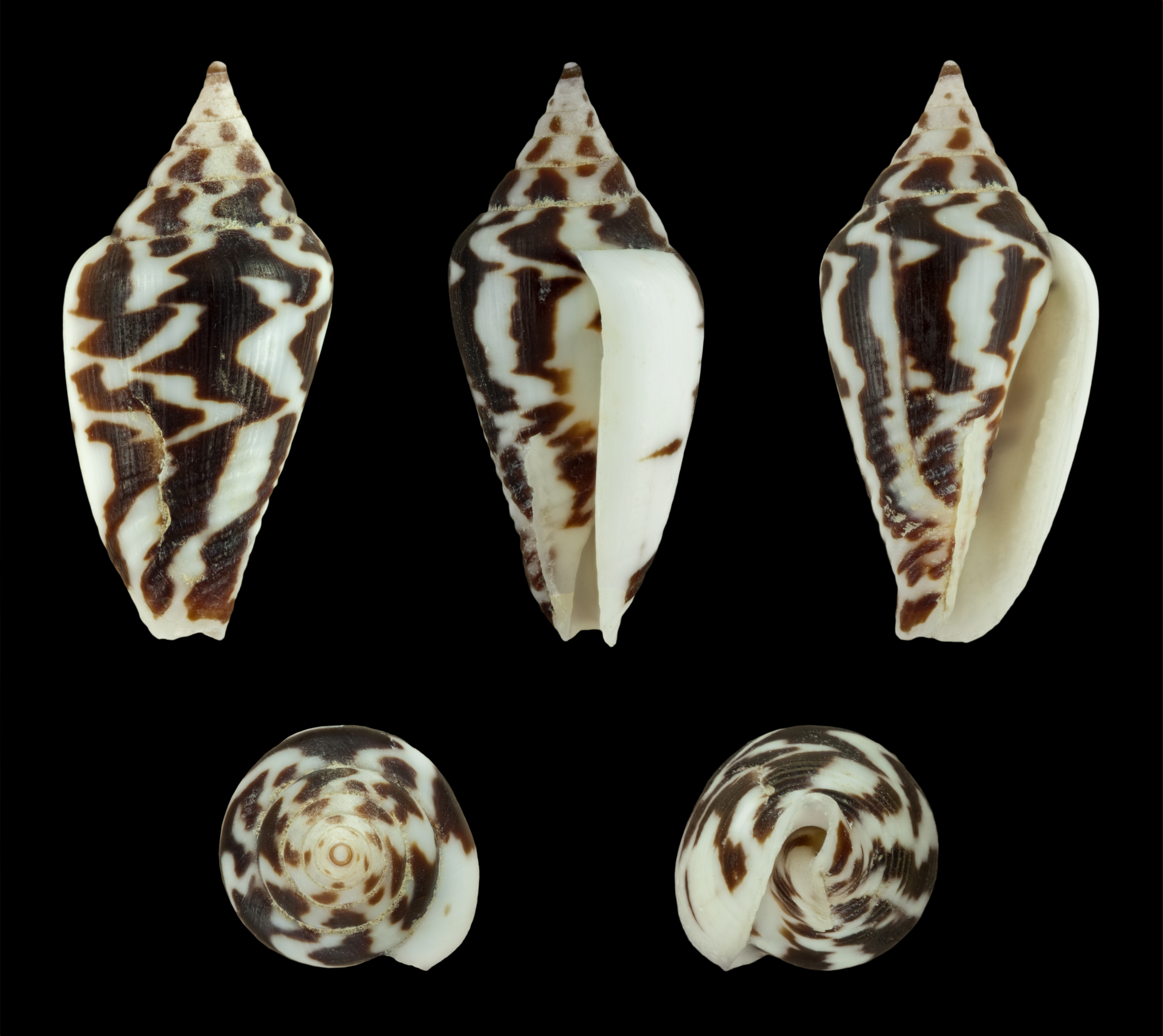
Parametaria epamella

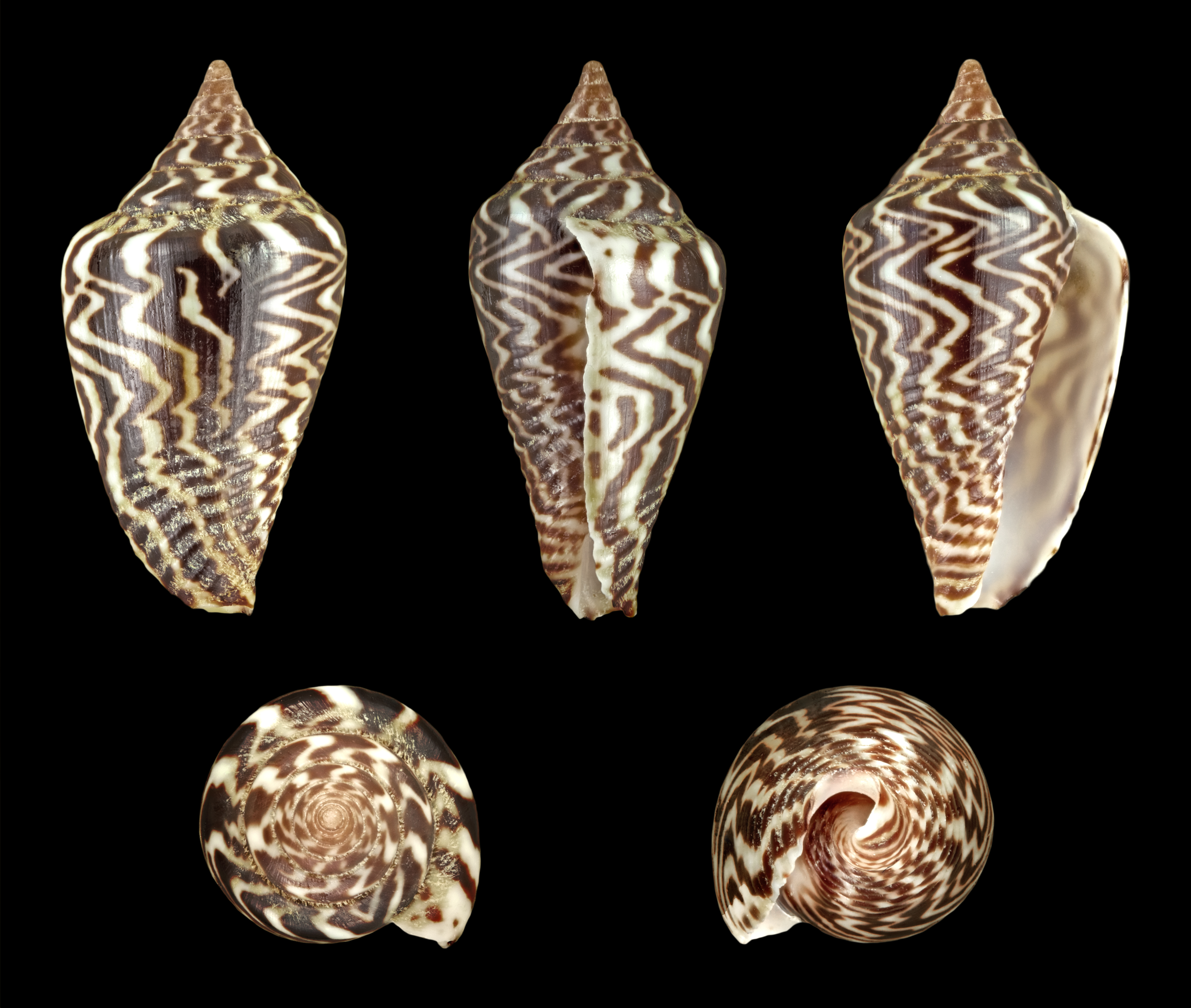
Parametaria epamella

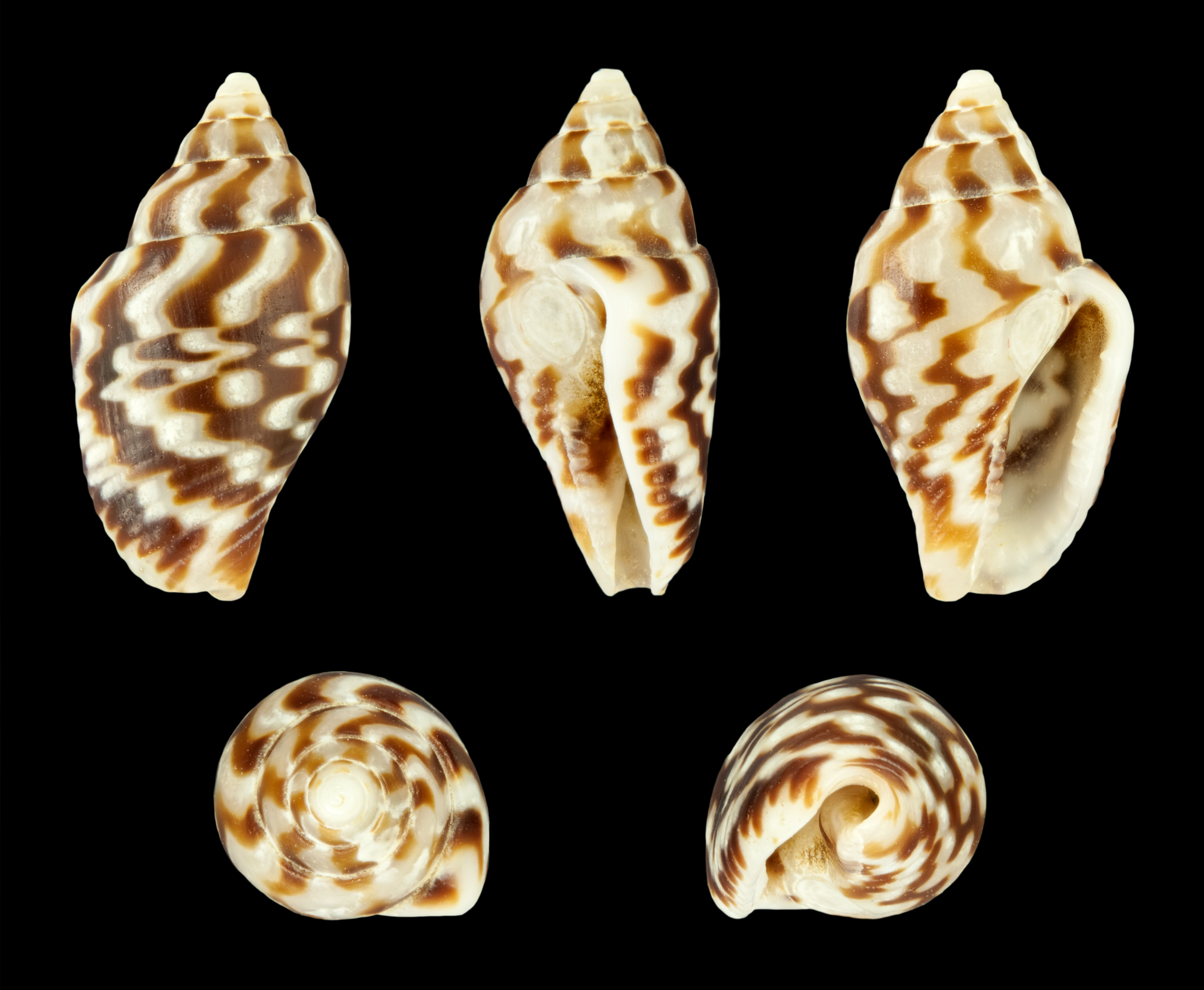
Parametaria philippinarum
