= Civic Aquarium of Milan =

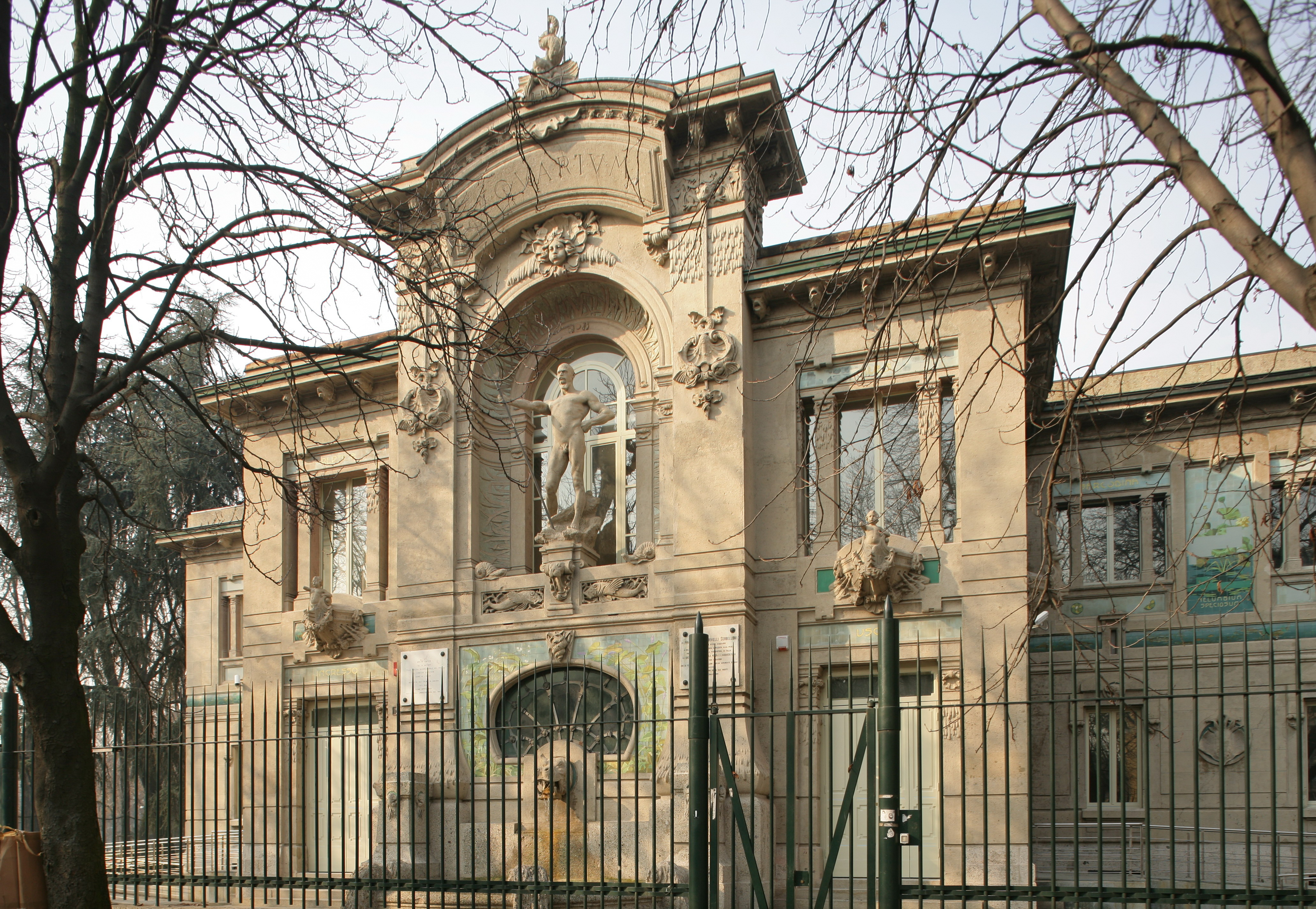
- Civic Aquarium of Milan
- Interactive map of Civic Aquarium of Milan
- 45.4740°N 9.1808°E
- Date opened: 1906
- Location: Viale Gadio, Milan, 20121 Italy
- No. of species: 100+
- Director: Mauro Mariani
- Website: www.acquariodimilano.it

The Civic Aquarium of Milan (Acquario Civico di Milano in Italian) is an aquarium in Milan, Italy, and the third oldest aquarium in Europe. Built in 1906 on the occasion of the Milan International, it is the only surviving building from the event. Sited on the edge of Sempione Park, the aquarium has over 100 different types of underwater life located in several tanks with a particular attention for the fishes and aquatic vegetation of the Italian seacoasts, lakes, and rivers.

The facade of the aquarium includes a Neptune statue, the Roman god of water and the sea, created by sculptor Oreste Labò.

The aquarium library, which was opened to the public, had one of Italy's most prestigious collection of marine biology publications, and it was absorbed by the Library of the Civic Museum of Natural History of Milan in 2015.

== Gallery ==
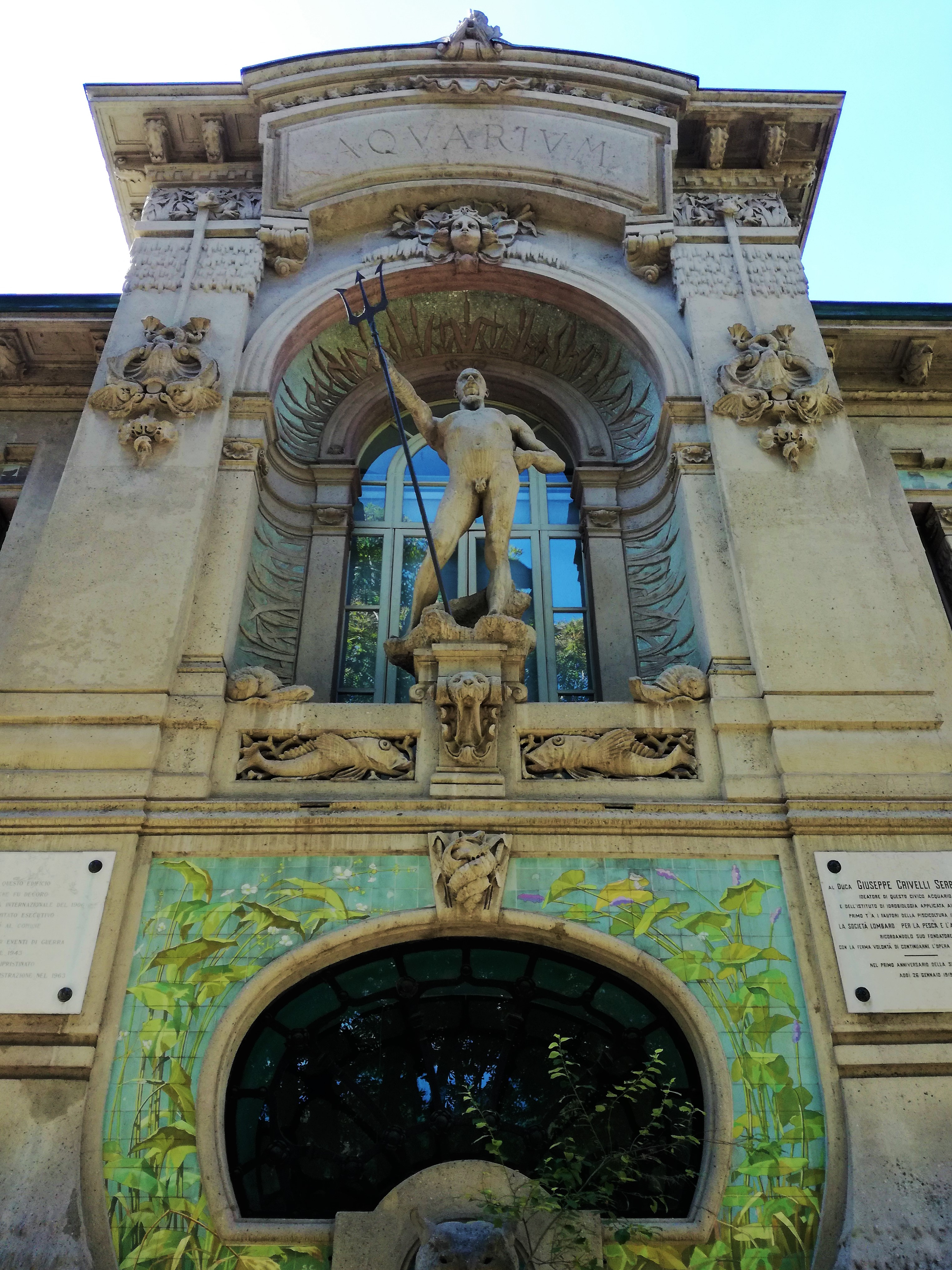
Neptune statue

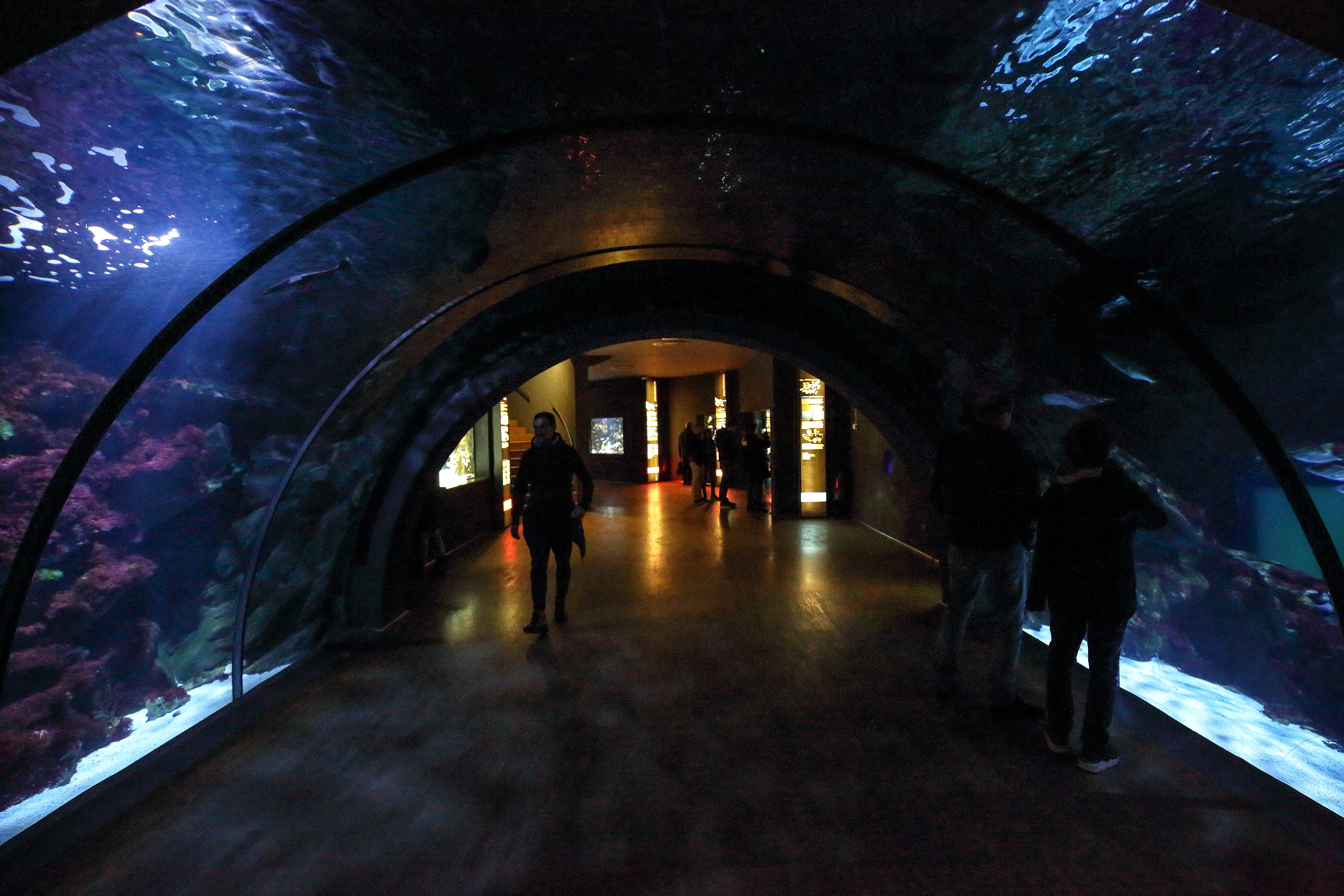
One of the pools of the aquarium

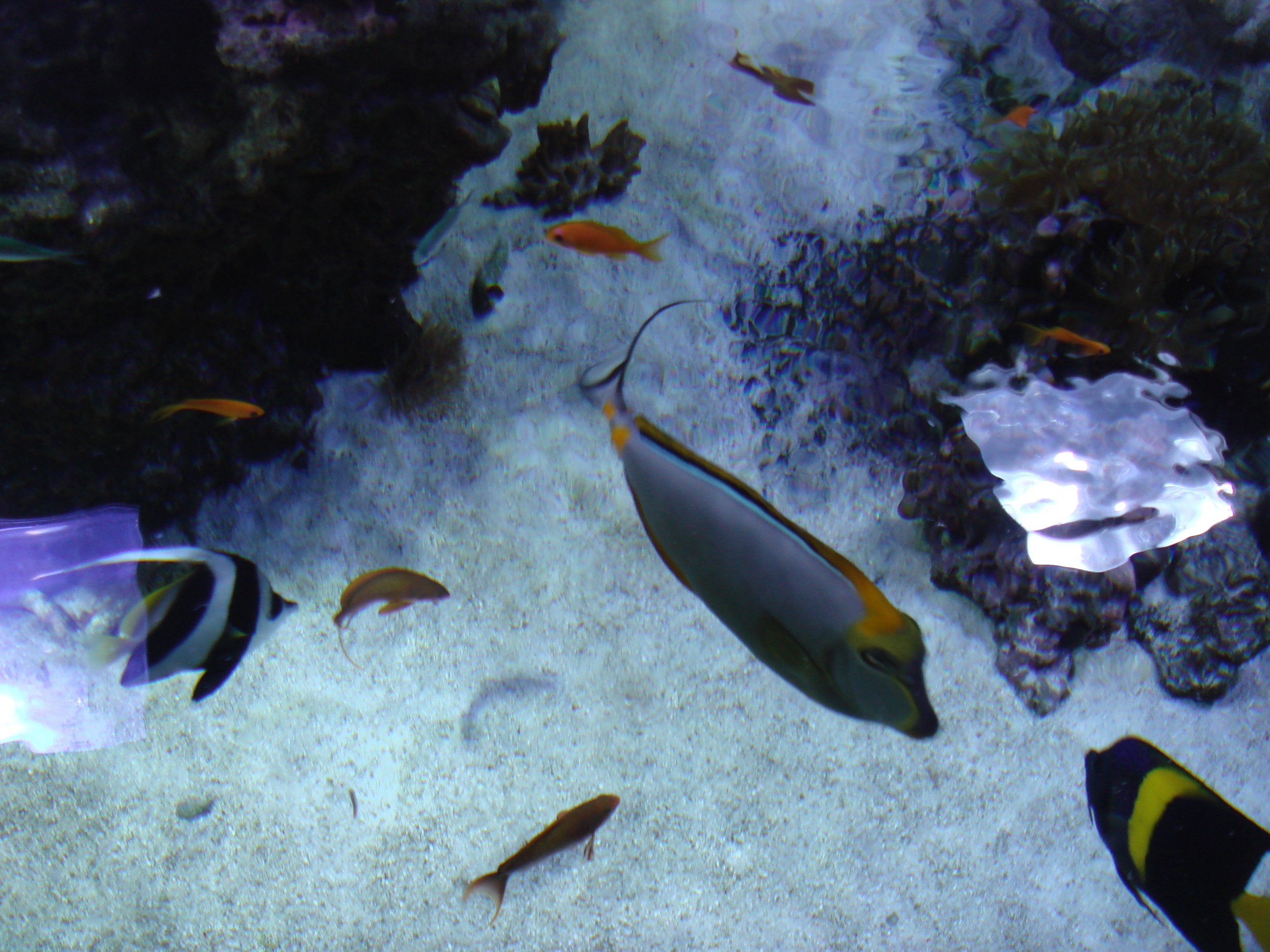
Some fish

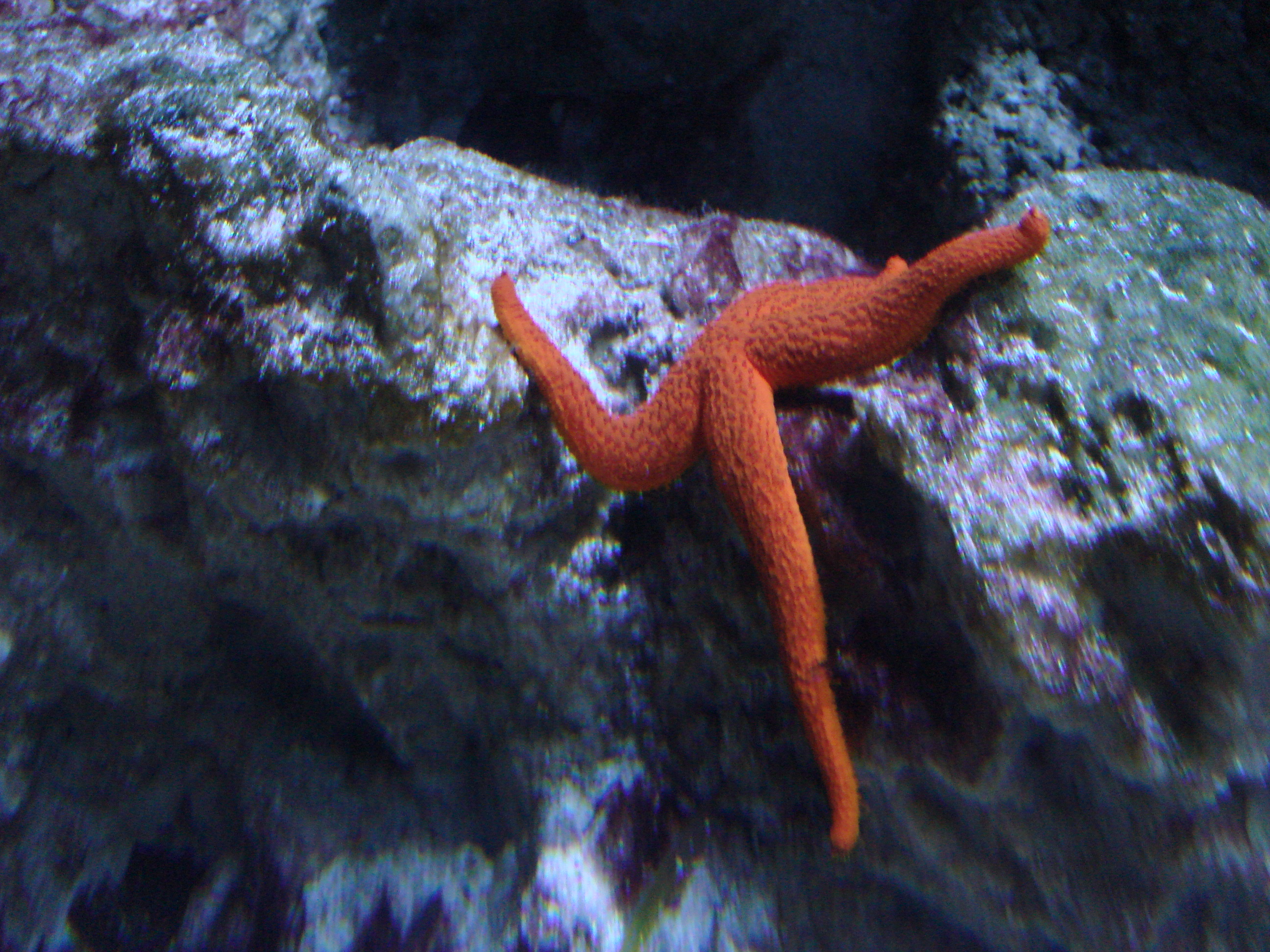
A starfish

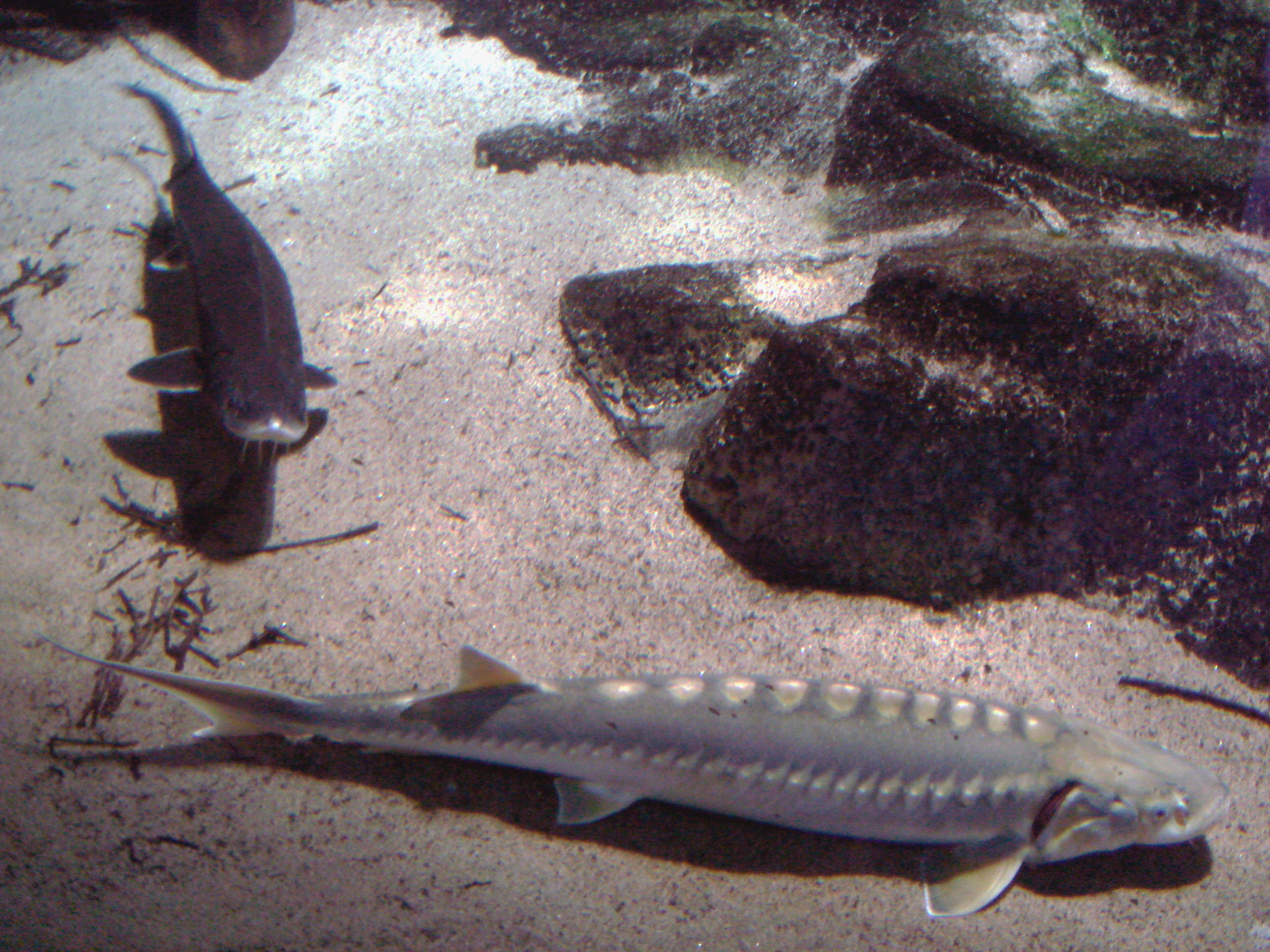
Aquarium with sturgeon

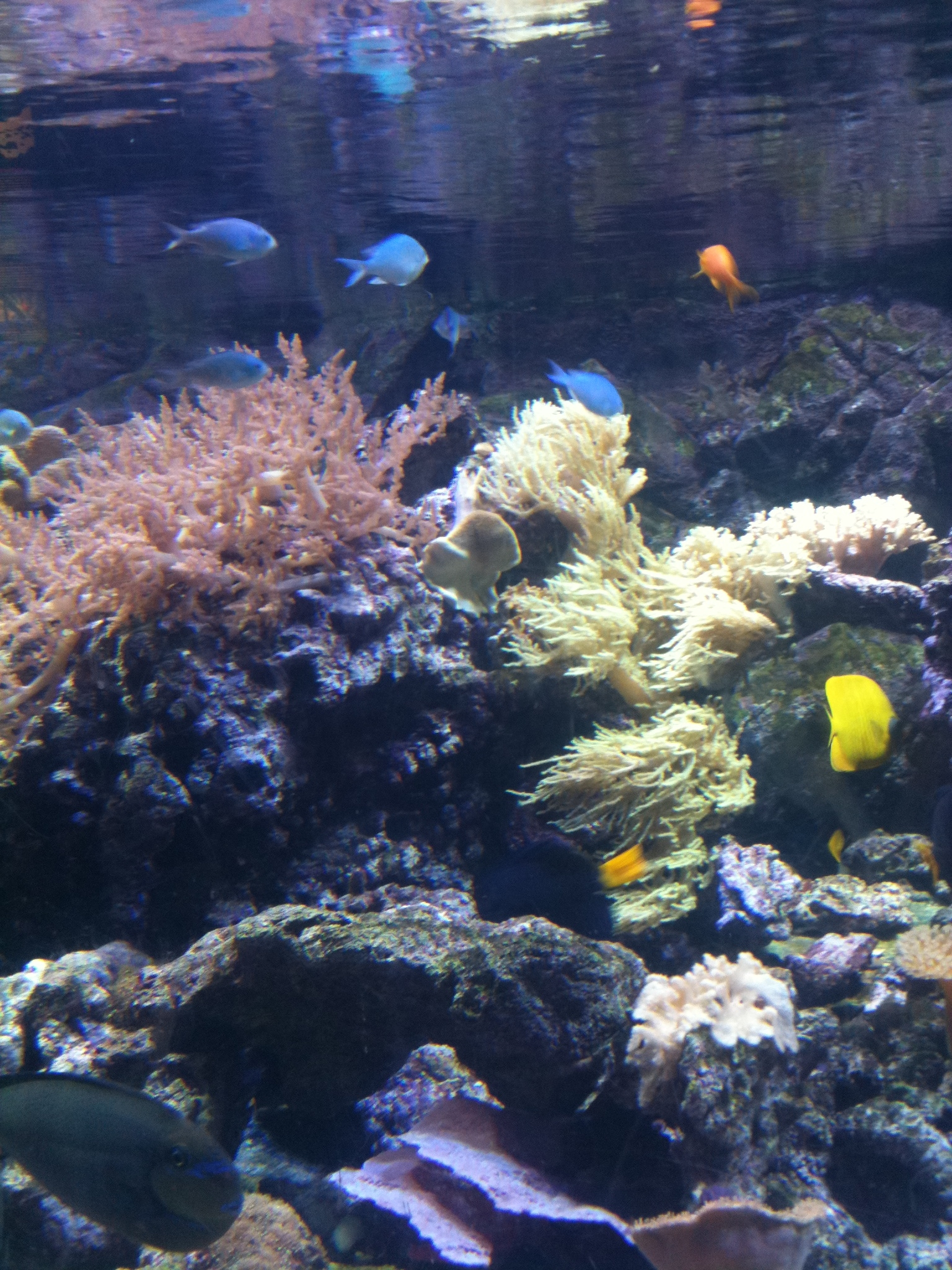
The reef

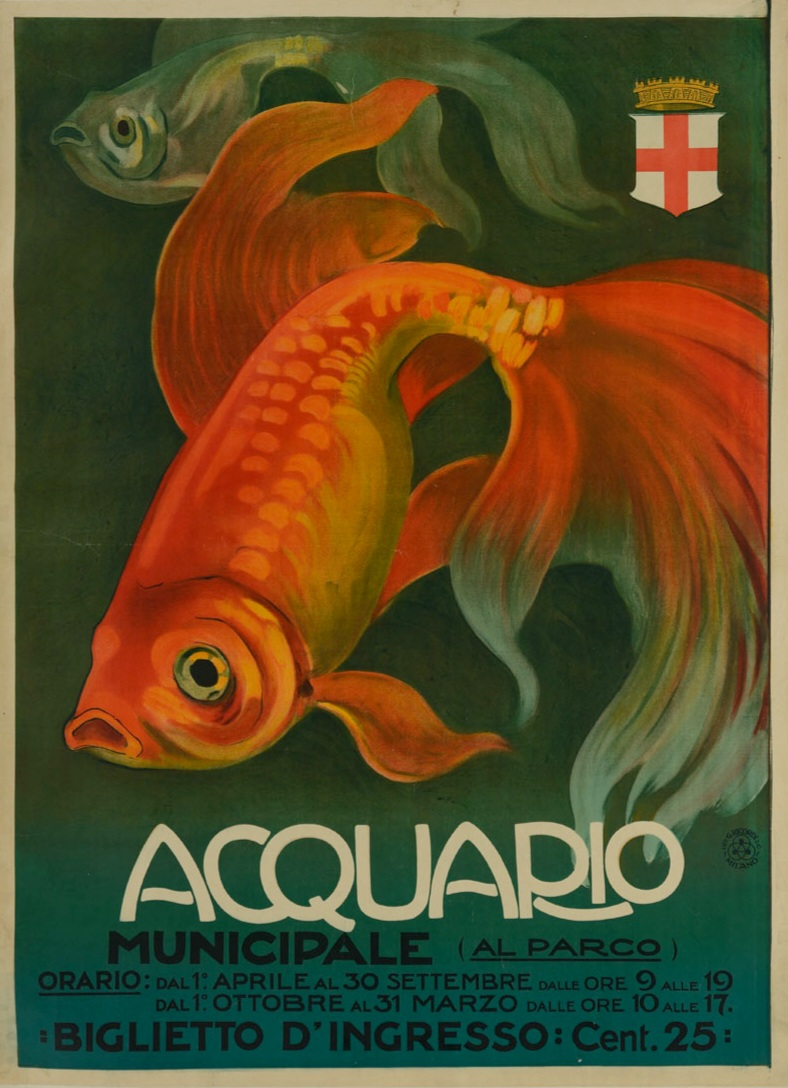
Leopoldo Metlicovitz's poster advertising the Civic Aquarium of Milan
