= Carabus marietti mouthiezi =

Scientific classification
- Kingdom: Animalia
- Phylum: Arthropoda
- Class: Insecta
- Order: Coleoptera
- Suborder: Adephaga
- Family: Carabidae
- Genus: Carabus
- Species: C. marietti
- Subspecies: C. m. mouthiezi

Trinomial name
- Carabus marietti mouthiezi Lassalle, 1991

Subspecies of beetle

Carabus marietti mouthiezi is a subspecies in the beetle family Carabidae. It is endemic to Turkey.
