= Edmund A. Gann =

American businessman and Thoroughbred racehorse owner

- Born: October 10, 1923; Gloucester, Massachusetts, U.S.
- Died: February 5, 2010 (aged 86); Rancho Santa Fe, California, U.S.
- Occupations: Commercial fishing executive Racehorse owner
- Board member of: Johns Hopkins Sidney Kimmell Cancer Center
- Spouse: Bernice
- Children: Diane, Sally

Edmund A. Gann (October 10, 1923 – February 5, 2010) was an American businessman and Thoroughbred racehorse owner.

== Early life and career ==
Born in the fishing port of Gloucester, Massachusetts, the young Gann moved with his family to California, where his father built and operated a commercial fishing clipper. During World War II, he served with the United States Navy. Following his discharge, Edmund Gann went to work managing a grocery store his father had acquired as an investment. From there, he entered the fishing business with his brother Joseph and their company, Caribbean Marine Service Co. Inc., became a highly successful tuna-fishing fleet operator.

== Tri-Union Seafoods ==
In 1997, Edmund Gann partnered with Tri-Marine International, Inc. of Singapore and Thai Union International of Bangkok to create Tri-Union Seafoods LLC which acquired the San Diego, California based canned tuna processing and packing company, Chicken of the Sea. In 2000, Gann sold his twenty-five percent stake in Chicken of the Sea to Thai Union International.

Although the fishing industry has been where he had his principal investment, Edmund Gann also has had interests in the oil industry, banking, hardware, and real estate development.

== Thoroughbred racing ==
Stable Colors - Red, white and blue silks; matching cap

In the mid 1960s Edmund Gann became involved in thoroughbred horse racing by accident after a friend was unable to repay a loan and offered a racing mare, named Bold Producer, instead. With little alternative, Gann took ownership of the horse, which promptly won three straight races. Enamored with racing, he began building a solid stable by buying horses in the United States as well as in Europe. In 1975, he hired future U.S. Racing Hall of Fame inductee Robert Frankel as his trainer. For twenty-one years they worked closely and met with considerable success at racetracks across the United States. However, in October 2006, the two parted company and Gann transferred the bulk of his horses to trainer John Sadler. Along with Marty Wofson in Florida, Bill Mott also trained some of Gann's horses.

Edmund Gann's successful runners have won races in the United States, France and in Japan where in 1988 Pay The Butler won the prestigious Japan Cup. His American-based horses include multiple Grade I winners Peace Rules, Denon, and You, plus Travers Stakes winner Medaglia d'Oro who retired at the end of 2004 having earned more than $5.7 million. Gann was also the owner of Cristobal.

A hobby sailor, Edmund Gann was a member of San Diego Yacht Club. Mr. Gann died from cancer on February 5, 2010.
