= Carabus marietti akensis =

Scientific classification
- Kingdom: Animalia
- Phylum: Arthropoda
- Class: Insecta
- Order: Coleoptera
- Suborder: Adephaga
- Family: Carabidae
- Genus: Carabus
- Species: C. marietti
- Subspecies: C. m. akensis

Trinomial name
- Carabus marietti akensis Haury, 1889

Synonyms
- Carabus akensiculus Cavazzuti, 2006

Subspecies of beetle

Carabus marietti akensis is a subspecies of ground beetle in the Carabinae subfamily that is endemic to Turkey. The species are black coloured with purple pronotum.
