= Carabus marietti inexpectatus =

Scientific classification
- Kingdom: Animalia
- Phylum: Arthropoda
- Class: Insecta
- Order: Coleoptera
- Suborder: Adephaga
- Family: Carabidae
- Genus: Carabus
- Species: C. marietti
- Subspecies: C. m. inexpectatus

Trinomial name
- Carabus marietti inexpectatus Basquin & Darge, 1986

Subspecies of beetle

Carabus marietti inexpectatus is a subspecies of beetle from the family Carabidae that is endemic to Turkey.
