= Carabus marietti sapancaensis =

Scientific classification
- Kingdom: Animalia
- Phylum: Arthropoda
- Class: Insecta
- Order: Coleoptera
- Suborder: Adephaga
- Family: Carabidae
- Genus: Carabus
- Species: C. marietti
- Subspecies: C. m. sapancaensis

Trinomial name
- Carabus marietti sapancaensis Blumenthal & Breuning, 1967

Subspecies of beetle

Carabus marietti sapancaensis is a subspecies of black-coloured beetle from the family Carabidae that is endemic to Turkey.
