= Cristóbal (disambiguation) =

Cristóbal is a given name and surname.

Cristóbal or Cristobal may also refer to:

== Places ==
- Cristóbal, Dominican Republic, a town
- Cristóbal, Colón, Panama, a port town and county
- Cristóbal Island, Panama

== Other uses ==
- Tropical Storm Cristobal, a list of tropical cyclones with the name Cristobal.
- Cristobal (horse) (foaled 2004), a Thoroughbred racehorse
