= Cristobal (horse) =

American-bred Thoroughbred racehorse

- Sire: Aptitude
- Grandsire: A.P. Indy
- Dam: Balenciaga
- Damsire: Gulch
- Sex: Stallion
- Foaled: 2004
- Country: United States
- Colour: Bay
- Owner: Edmund A. Gann
- Trainer: Jean-Claude Rouget
- Record: 10: 4-1-2

Major wins
- Prix Vulcain (2007); Prix Max Sicard (2007)
- Last updated on August 29, 2008

Cristobal (foaled February 20, 2004) is an American-bred Thoroughbred racehorse who has raced in France. He is owned by Rancho Santa Fe, California businessman Edmund A. Gann, best known as the owner of Medaglia d'Oro and Peace Rules as well as the 1988 Japan Cup winner, Pay the Butler.

Cristobal received his name, as did his dam, from the fashion designer, Cristóbal Balenciaga. The colt was sired by Aptitude out of the mare Balenciaga whose sire Gulch was the 1988 U.S. Champion Sprinter. His grandsire was A.P. Indy, the 1992 United States Horse of the Year.

Conditioned in France, Cristobal began racing as a three-year-old in 2007 and has started twice on the turf. Trained by Jean-Claude Rouget and ridden by Ioritz Mendizabal, in his debut Cristobal won a 2000-meter (1¼ miles) Maiden Race at Hippodrome de Marseille Borely on March 14, 2007. In his next start on April 8 at Longchamp Racecourse in Paris, he finished third by half a head in the 2200 meter (1.37 miles) Prix de Ferrieres, a conditions race for testing 3-year-olds notably won in 2005 by European Horse of the Year, Hurricane Run.

Brought to the United States by his owner, Cristobal was scheduled to run on June 9 in the Belmont Stakes, the third leg of the U.S. Triple Crown series. The Belmont is a 1½ mile race on dirt in which his sire finished second in 2000 and which his grandsire won in 1992. He was not entered and continued to race in France. Cristobal has raced twice in 2008, finishing third in his last race, the Prix de Reux Listed race at the Deauville Racecourse on August 9.
