= Museo Civico di Storia Naturale di Milano =

Museum in Milan, Italy

Coordinates: 45°28′22.26″N 9°12′8.07″E

Milan Natural History Museum
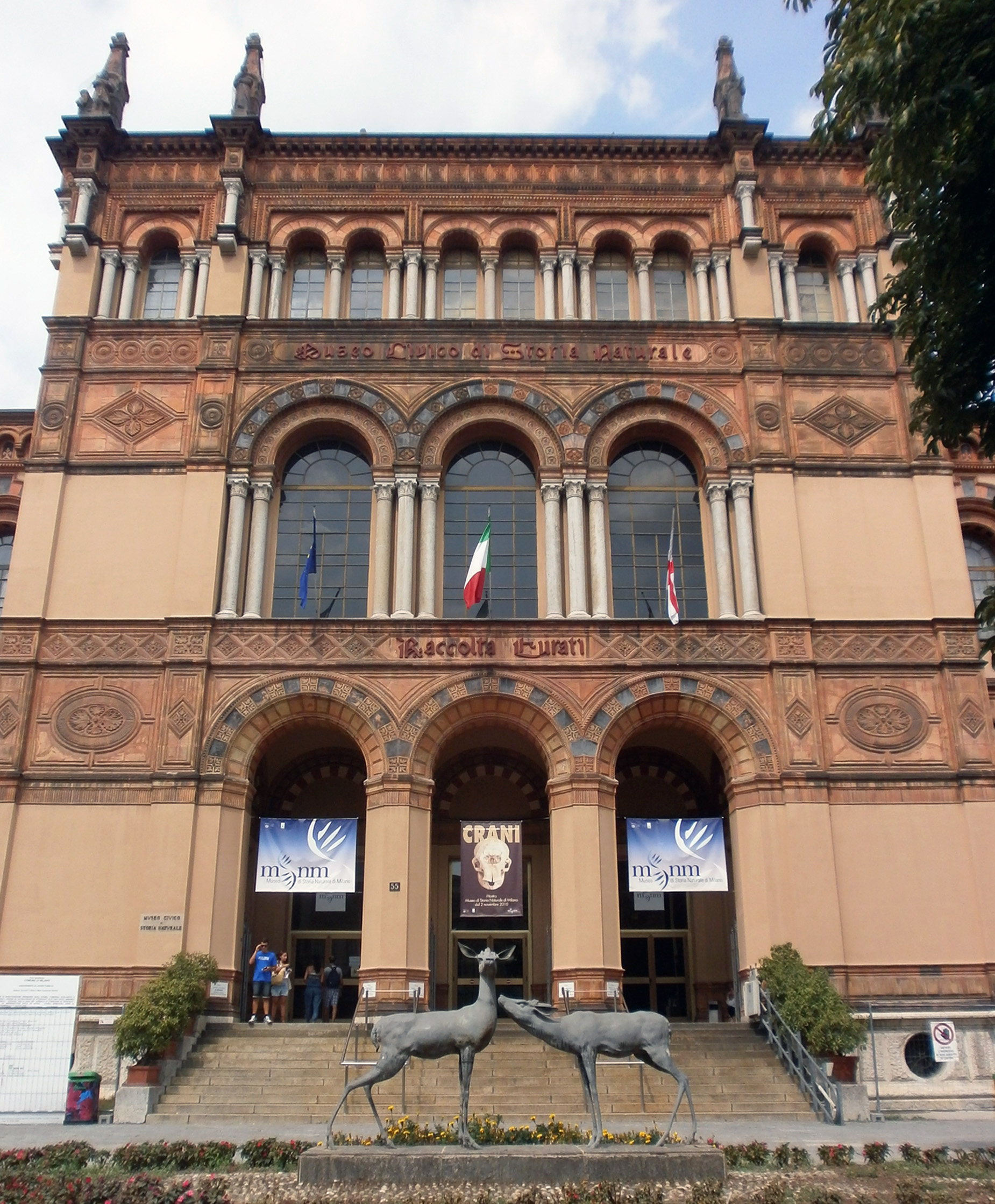
- Established: 1838
- Location: Corso Venezia, 55 - 20121 Milan, Italy
- Director: Domenico Piraina
- Website: Official website

The Museo Civico di Storia Naturale di Milano (Milan Natural History Museum) is a museum in Milan, Italy dedicated to the study of animals, plants, and the natural environment, including geology. Exhibits include dinosaurs and Italy's largest collection of dioramas of ecosystems.

== Museum ==
The museum was founded in 1838 when the naturalist Giuseppe de Cristoforis donated his collections to the city. Its first director was the taxonomist Giorgio Jan.

The museum is housed in a 19th-century building in the Indro Montanelli Garden, near the historic city gate of Porta Venezia. It was built between 1888 and 1893 in Neo-Romanesque style with Gothic elements.

The building incorporates a library.

== Collections ==
The museum is divided into five different permanent sections: Mineralogy (with a large collection of minerals from all over the world); Paleontology (with several fossils of dinosaurs and other prehistoric organisms); Natural History of Man (dedicated to the origins and evolution of humans with a particular attention to the relationship of the latter with the environment); Invertebrate Zoology (dedicated to mollusks, arthropods and entomology); and Vertebrate Zoology (dedicated to vertebrates, both exotic and European).

The museum exhibits the largest Italian collection of over 100 full-size dioramas. These allow visitors to observe many aspects of faraway ecosystems.

=== Mineralogy section ===
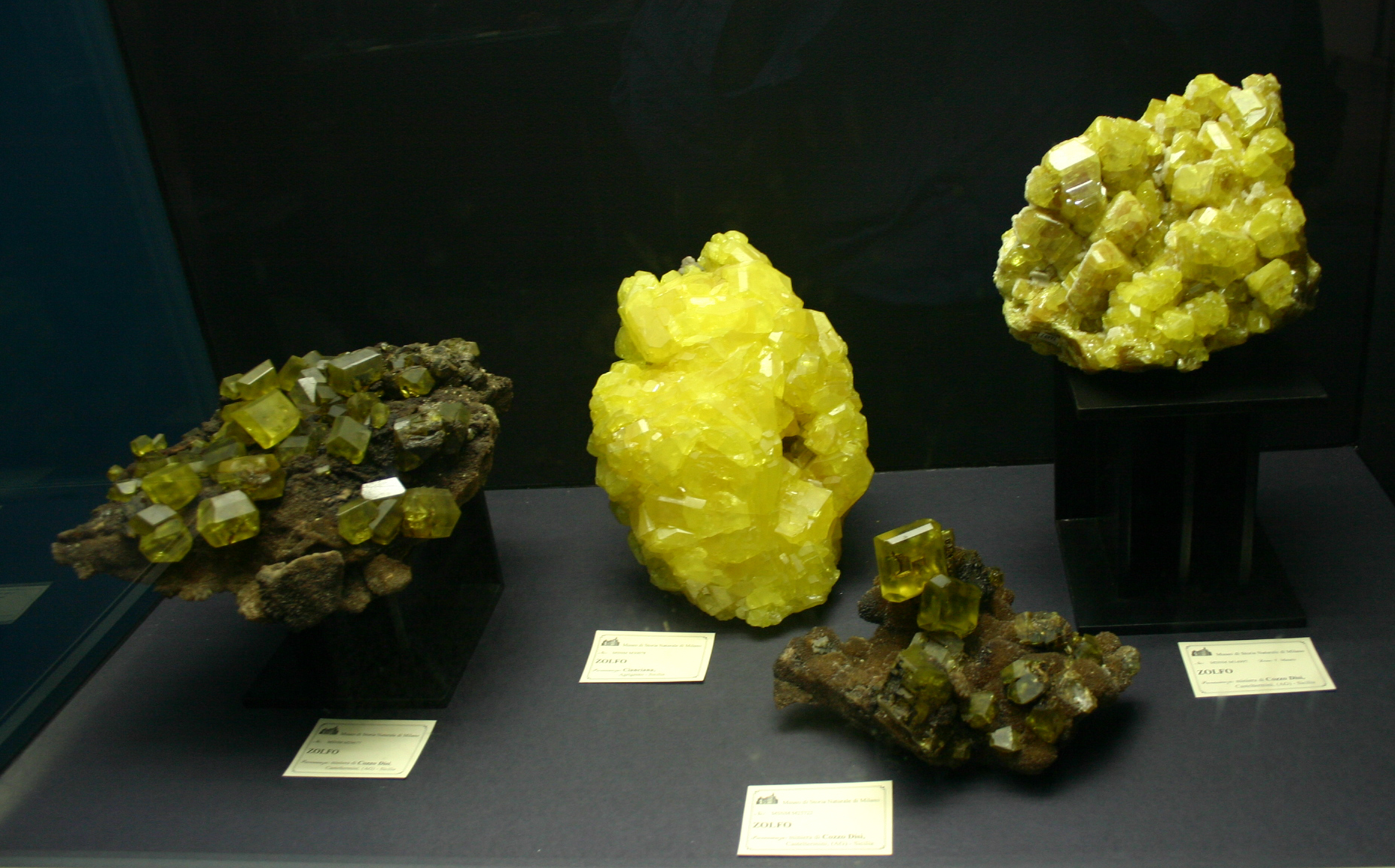
Sulfur crystals

The mineralogy section showcases several minerals from all over the world, including the world's largest sulfur crystal (from the province of Pesaro-Urbino) and an 8,000-carat Brazilian topaz crystal. Also displayed are examples of londonite, quartz, phosgenite, fluorite, malachite and other minerals.

=== Palaeontology section ===
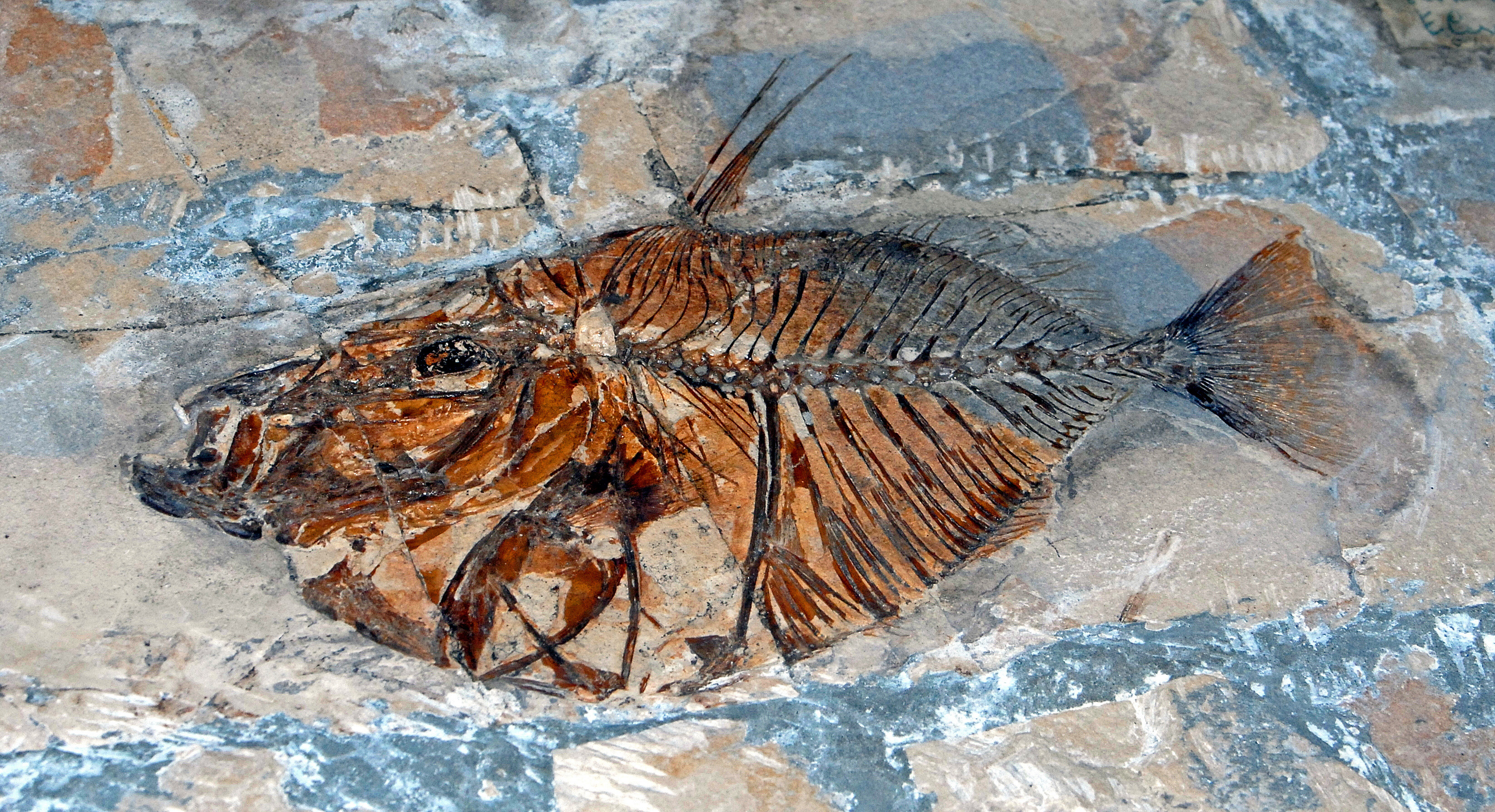
Fossil of Vomeropsis triurus

The palaeontology section explains the basics of paleozoology and palaeobotany. Displays include fossils of several plants and animals. Among the most valuable pieces are a Spinosaurus snout, the skeletons of two pygmy elephants (Palaeoloxodon falconeri) from Sicily and the only existing fossil of the coelurosaurian theropod Scipionix samniticus. The museum also houses several other casts of dinosaur skeletons such as Allosaurus, Stegosaurus, Dromaeosaurus, Plateosaurus, and Stan (dinosaur), the fifth most complete Tyrannosaurus ever found.

=== Natural history of man section ===
The natural history of man section is dedicated to the origins of humans from early primates to Homo sapiens. Human evolution is described from the phylogenetic, morphological and ecological points of view with several archaeological objects and realistic plastic models. One of the most valuable pieces is the cast of an Australopithecus afarensis skeleton.

=== Invertebrate zoology section ===
The invertebrate zoology section is divided into two exhibitions. The first is about mollusks and arthropods: displays include a giant clam, which is the largest living bivalve, two Japanese spider crabs (male and female), Scolopendra gigantea, and arachnids like many spiders and scorpions from all over the world. The second exhibition is dedicated to entomology and displays many insects.

=== Vertebrate zoology section ===
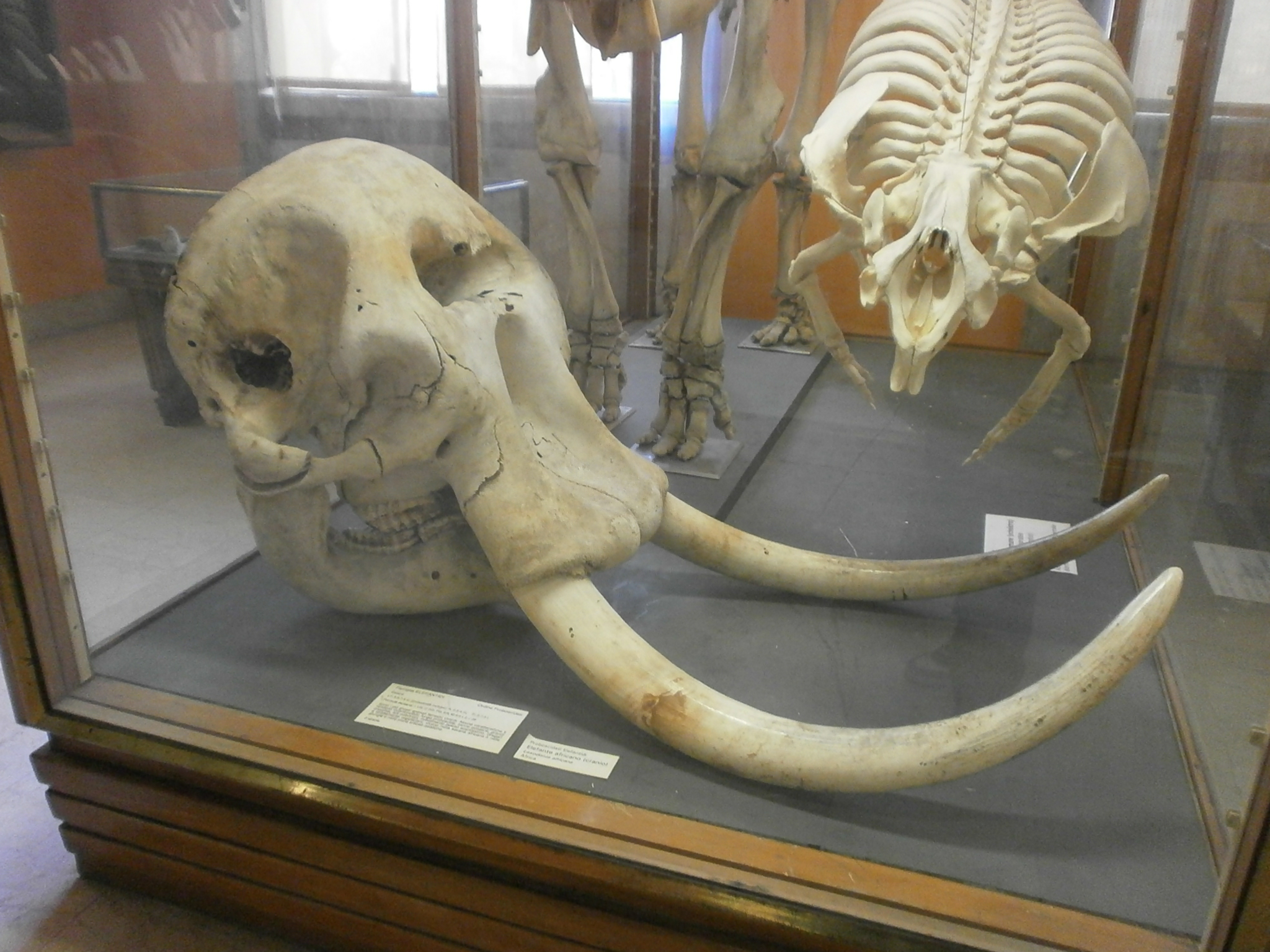
African bush elephant cranium

On the second floor of the building is the vertebrate zoology section. It displays many taxidermied animals from both Europe and abroad, and many animal skeletons, including that of a sperm whale that measures approximately twelve metres in length. There are also many full-scale dioramas with mounted specimens displayed in realistic settings.

The collection is notable for about 30 primary types of reptiles, many of which have been described by the museum's first director, Giorgio Jan, who is also one of the most prolific herpetologists of all time with about 100 reptile species described.

== Directors ==
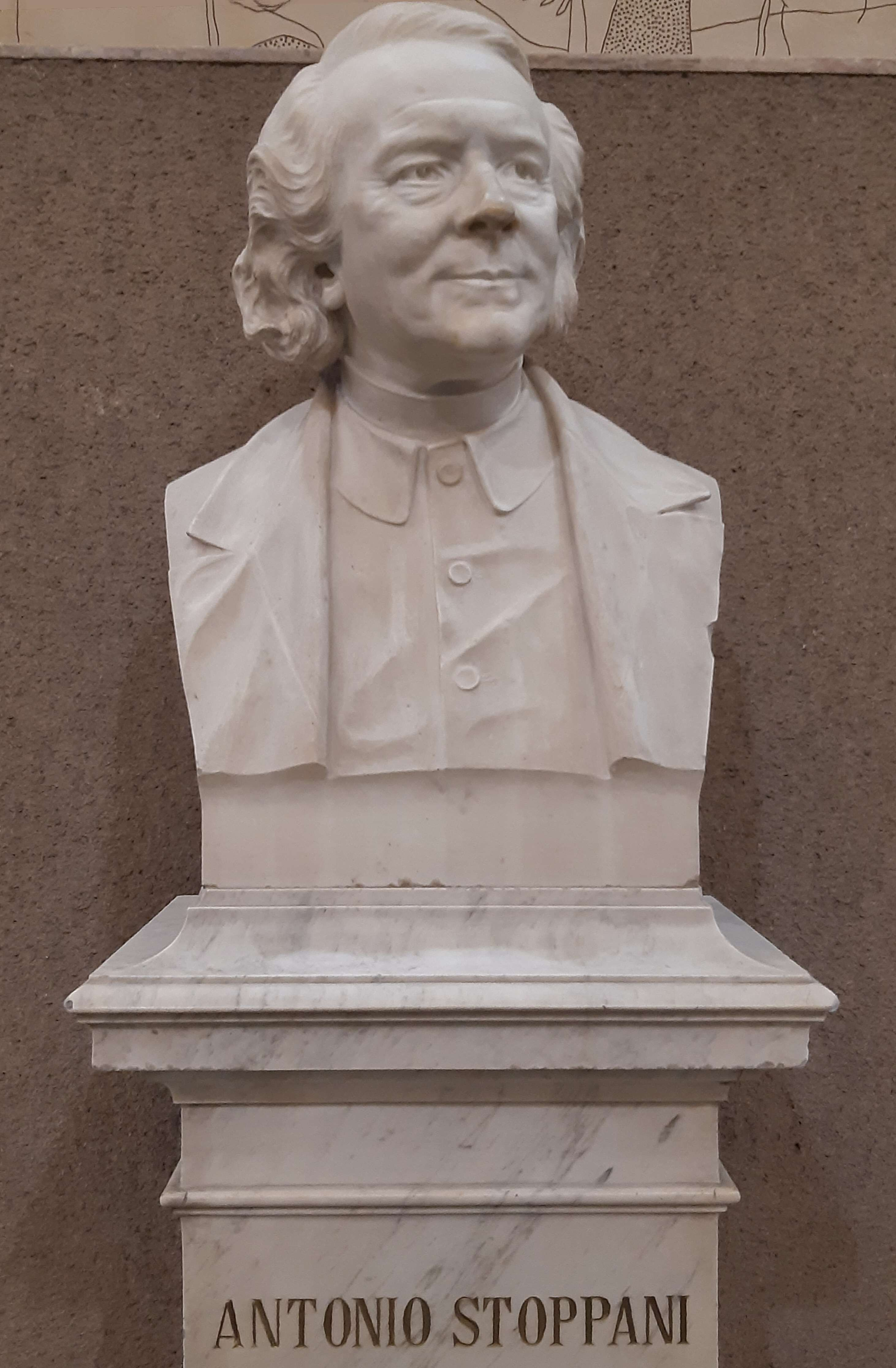
Statue of Antonio Stoppani, third director of the museum

- 1838–1866 Giorgio Jan
- 1866–1882 Emilio Cornalia
- 1882–1891 Antonio Stoppani
- 1892–1911 Tito Vignoli
- 1911–1927 Ettore Artini
- 1928–1951 Bruno Parisi
- 1951–1964 Edgardo Moltoni
- 1964–1981 Cesare Conci
- 1981–1994 Giovanni Pinna
- 1994–2001 Luigi Cagnolaro
- 2001–2010 Enrico Banfi
- 2010–2012 Mauro Mariani
- since 2012 Domenico Piraina

== Gallery ==
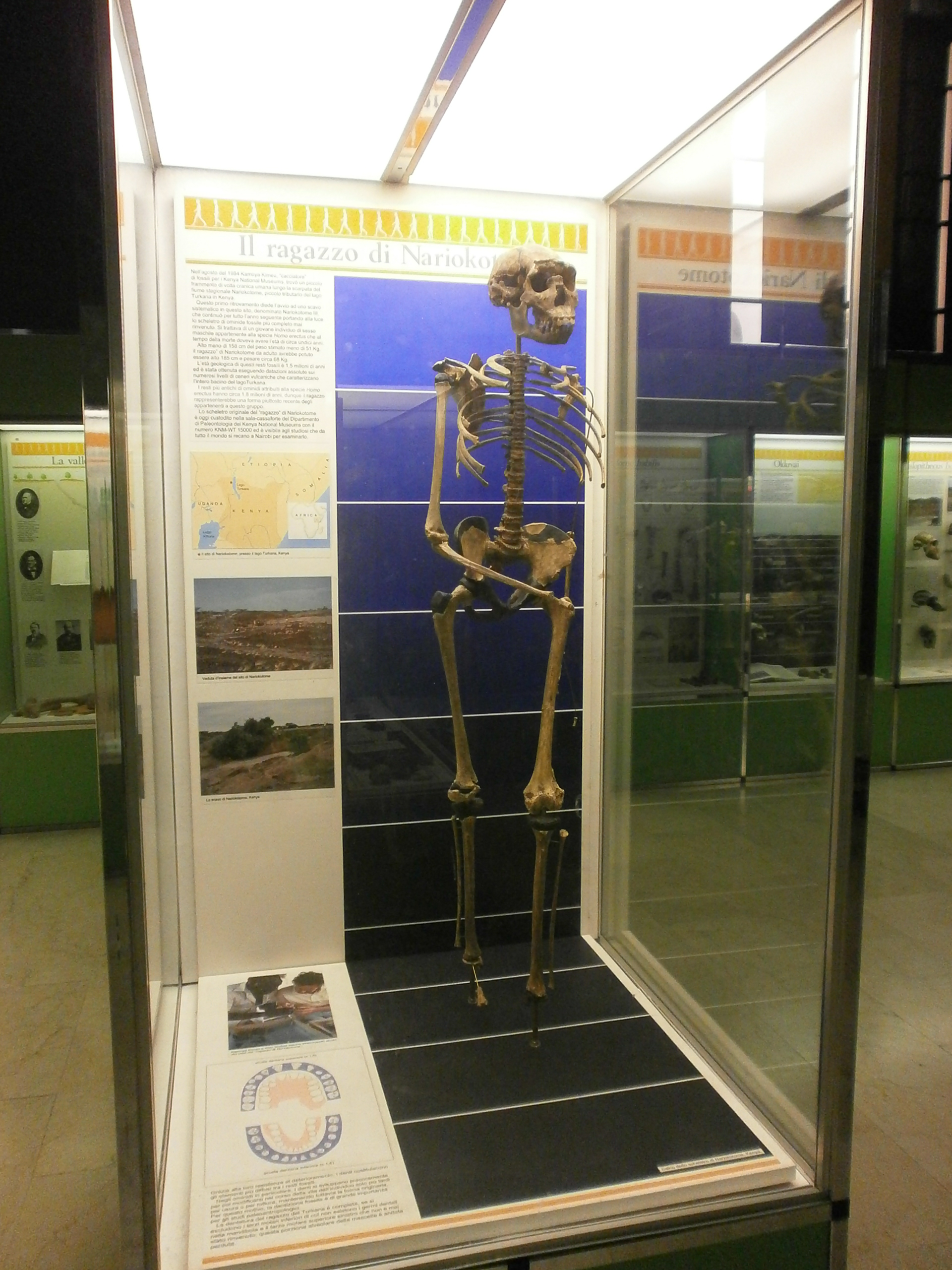
Turkana Boy (Homo ergaster)

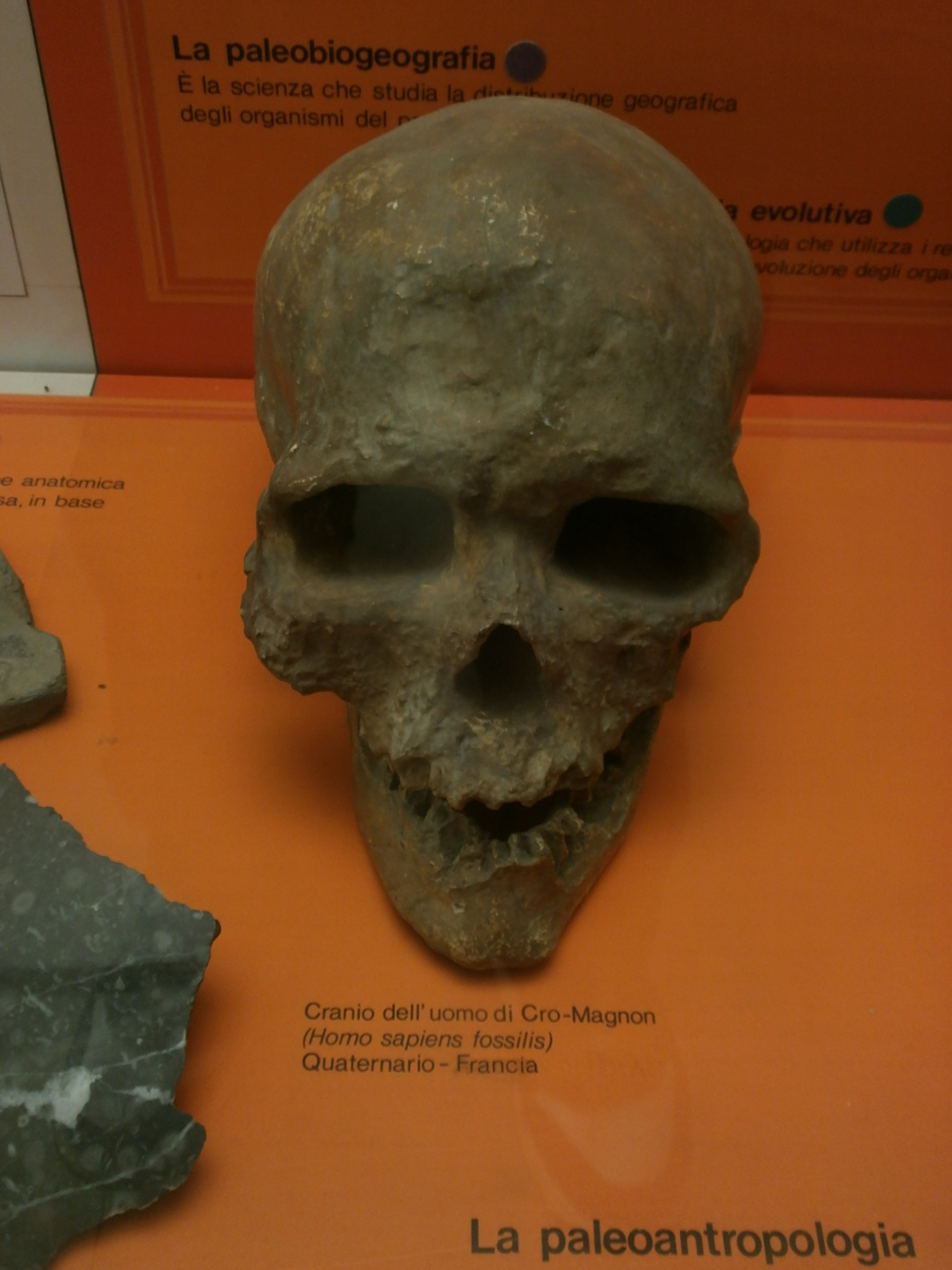
A Cro-Magnon skull from France

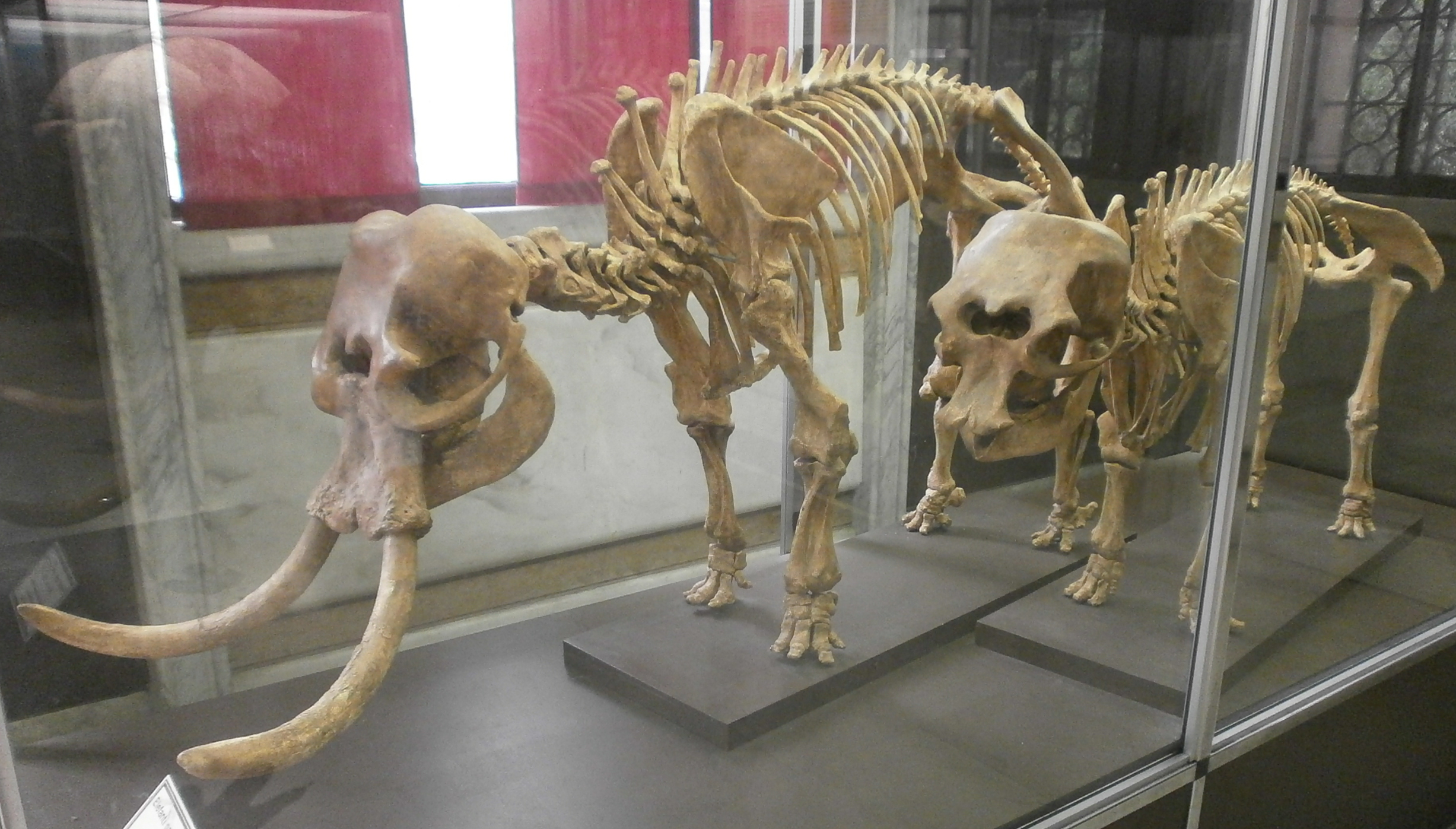
Pygmy elephant skeletons

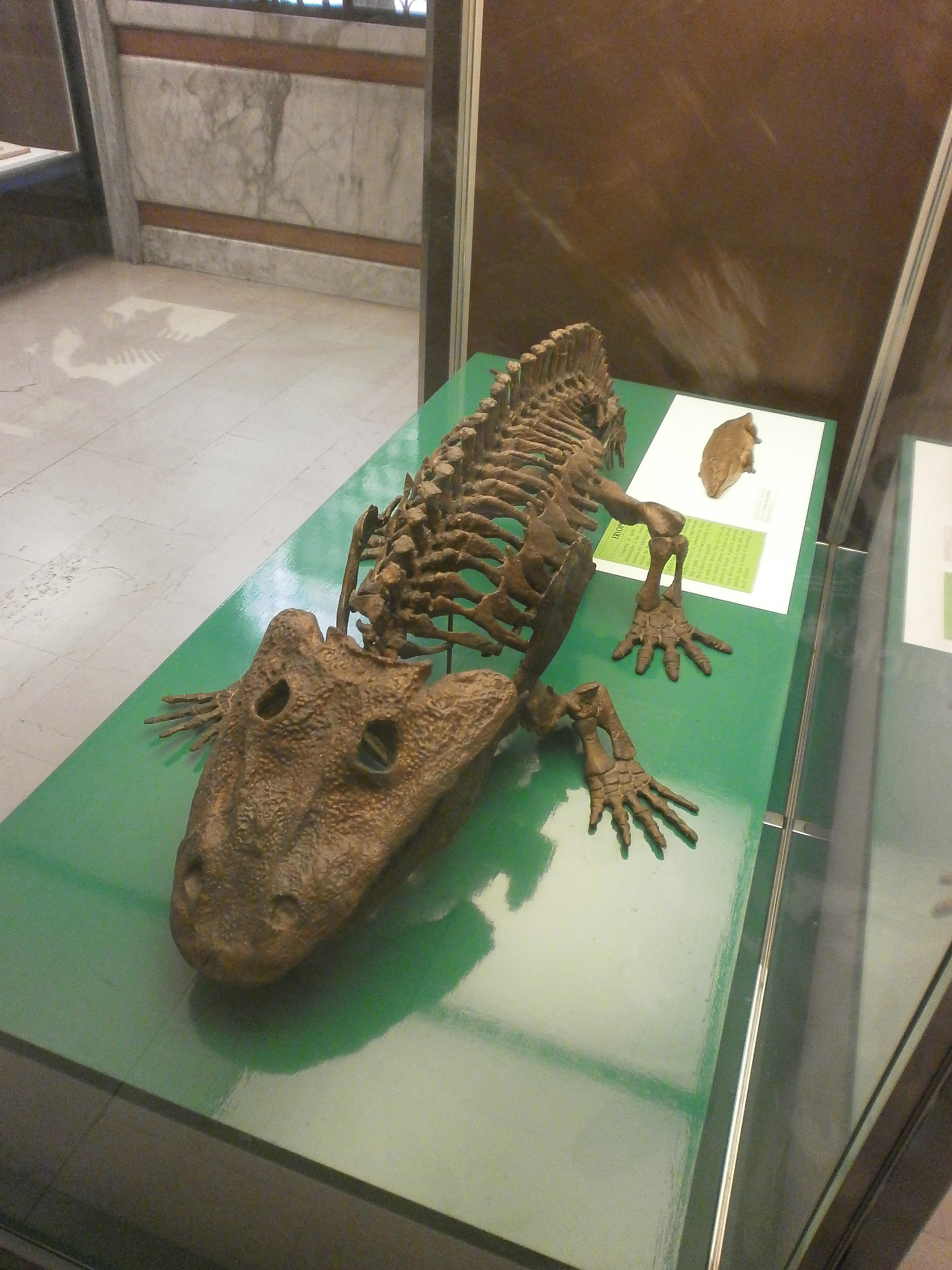
Eryops megacephalus

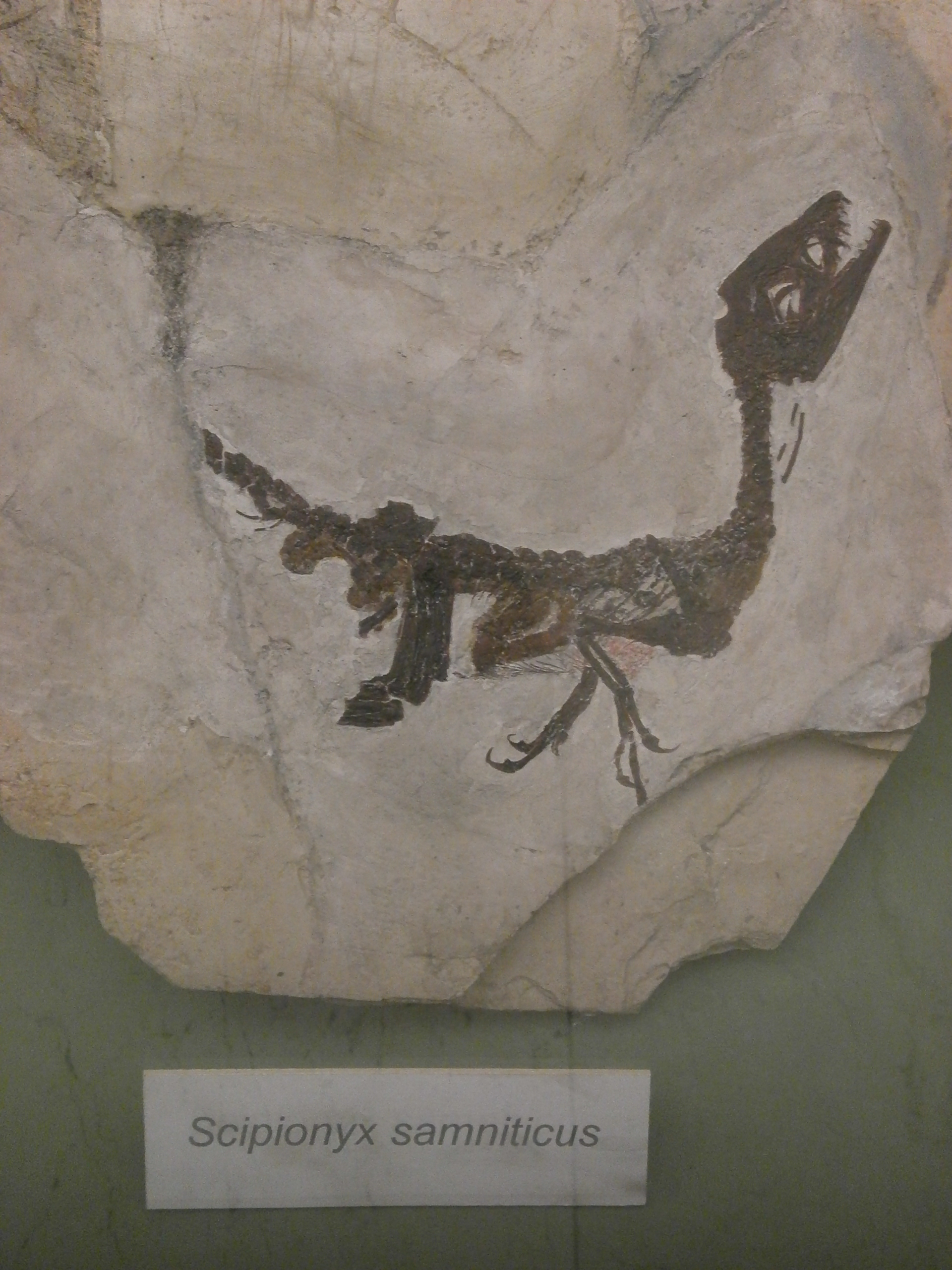
Scipionyx samniticus

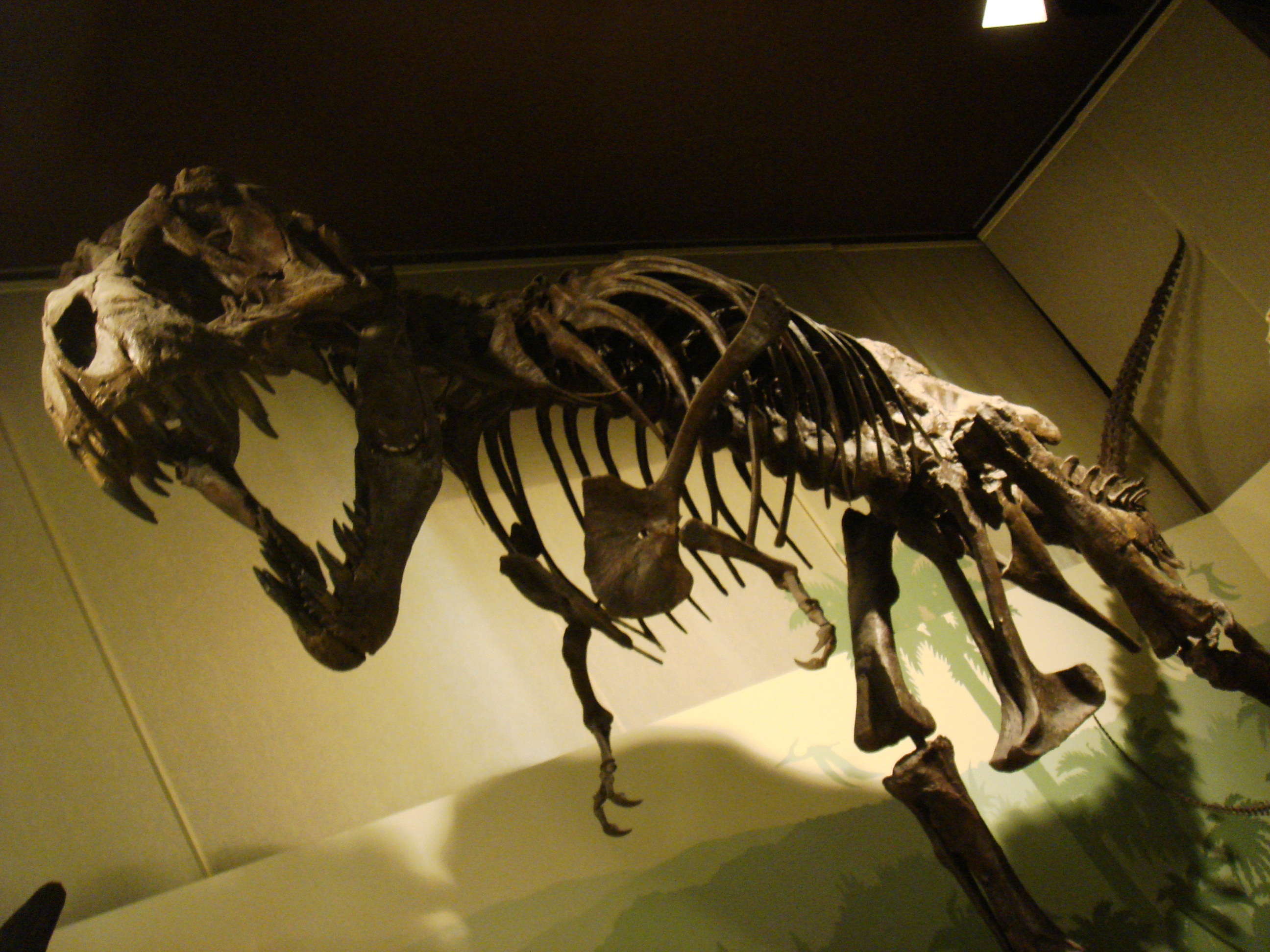
A Tyrannosaurus rex

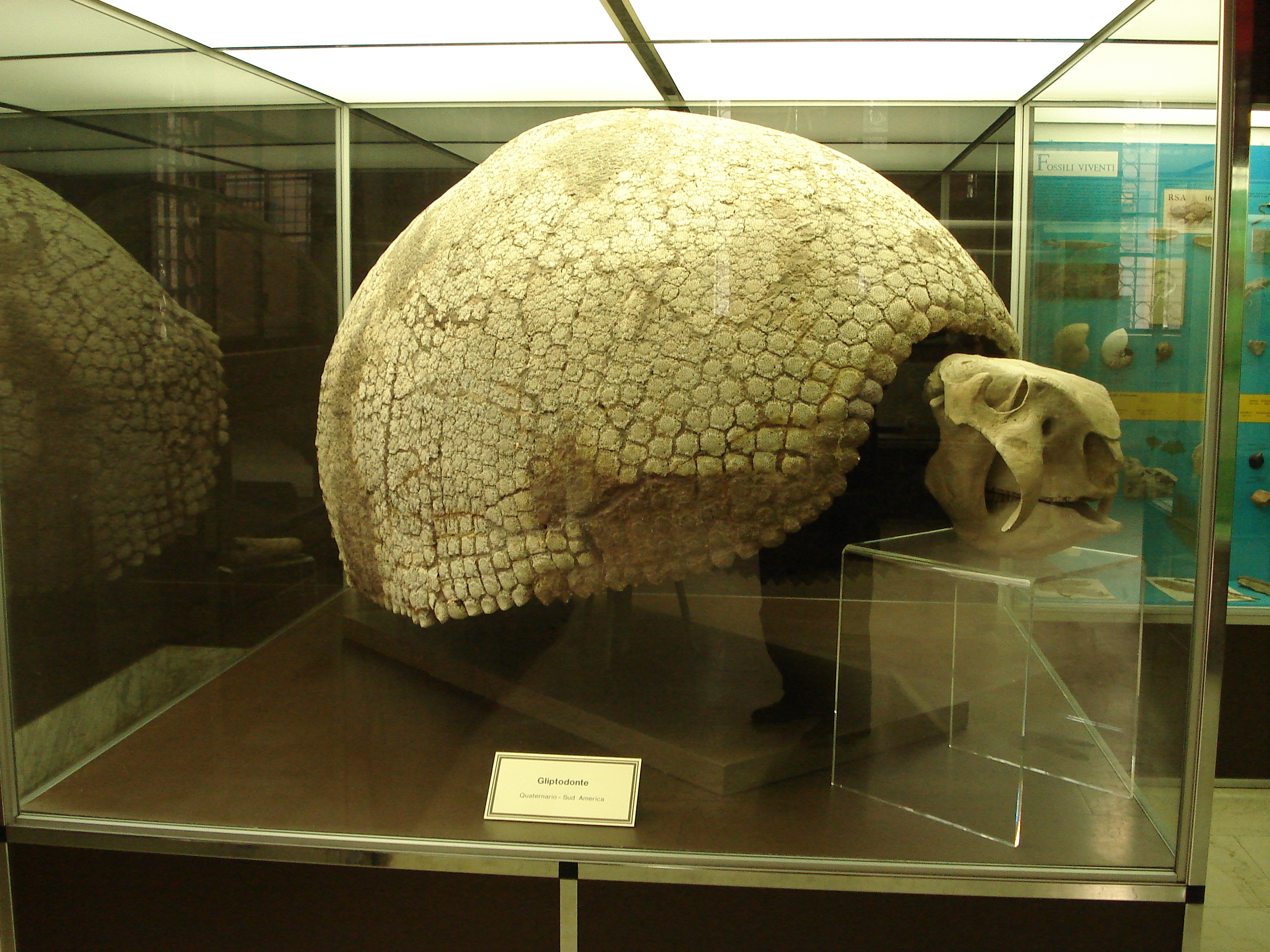
A Glyptodon

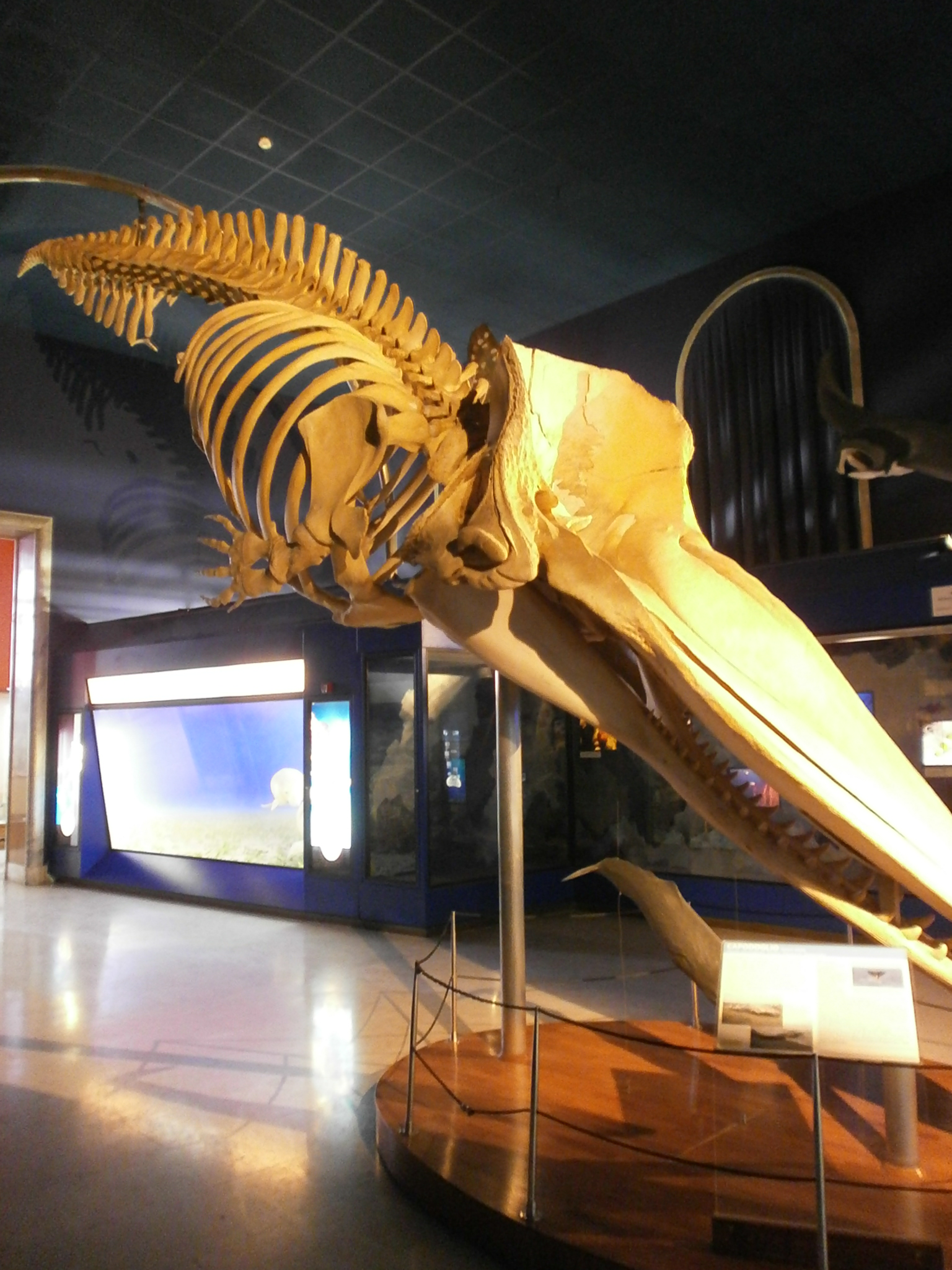
Sperm whale skeleton.

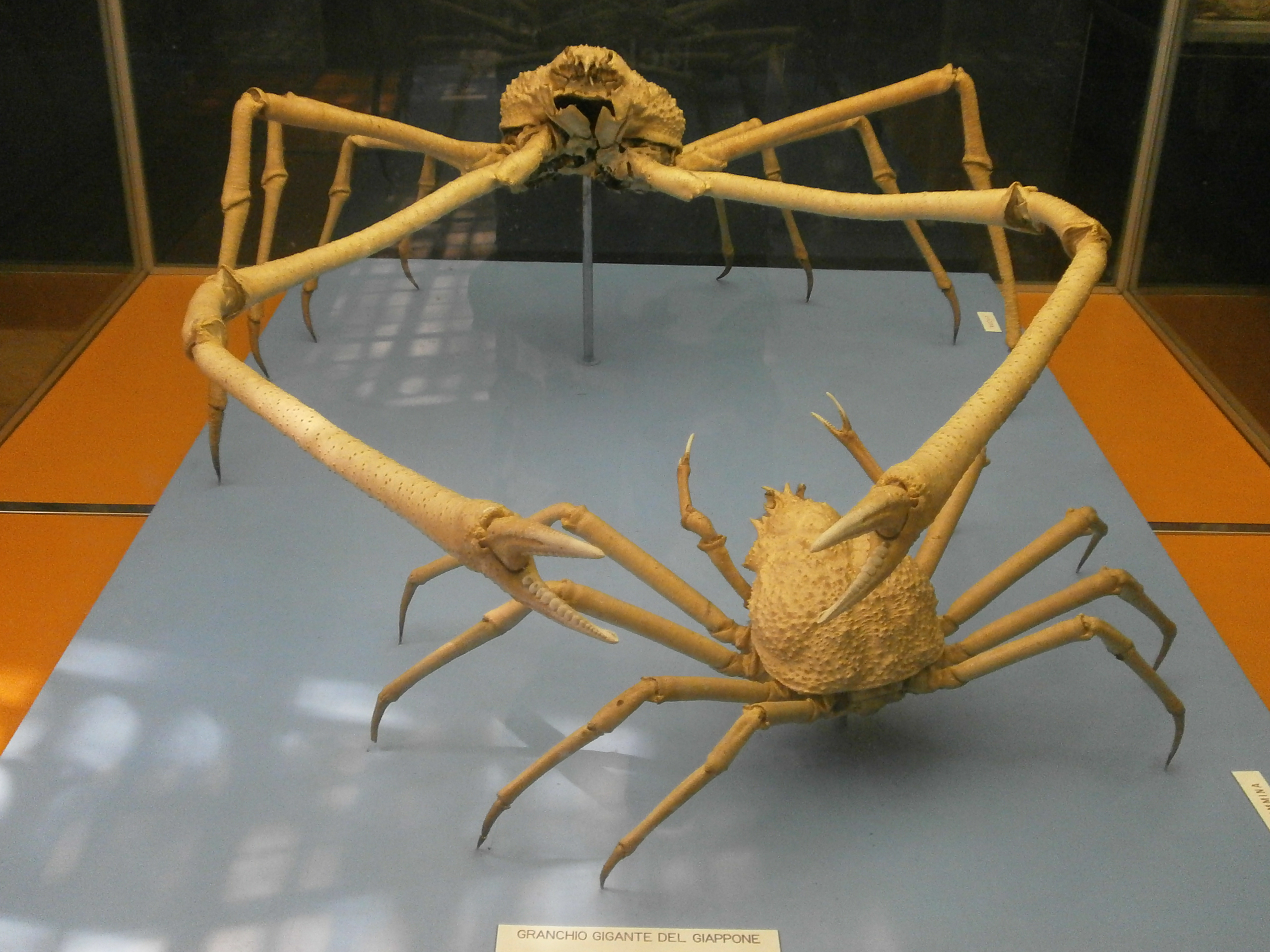
Japanese spider crabs

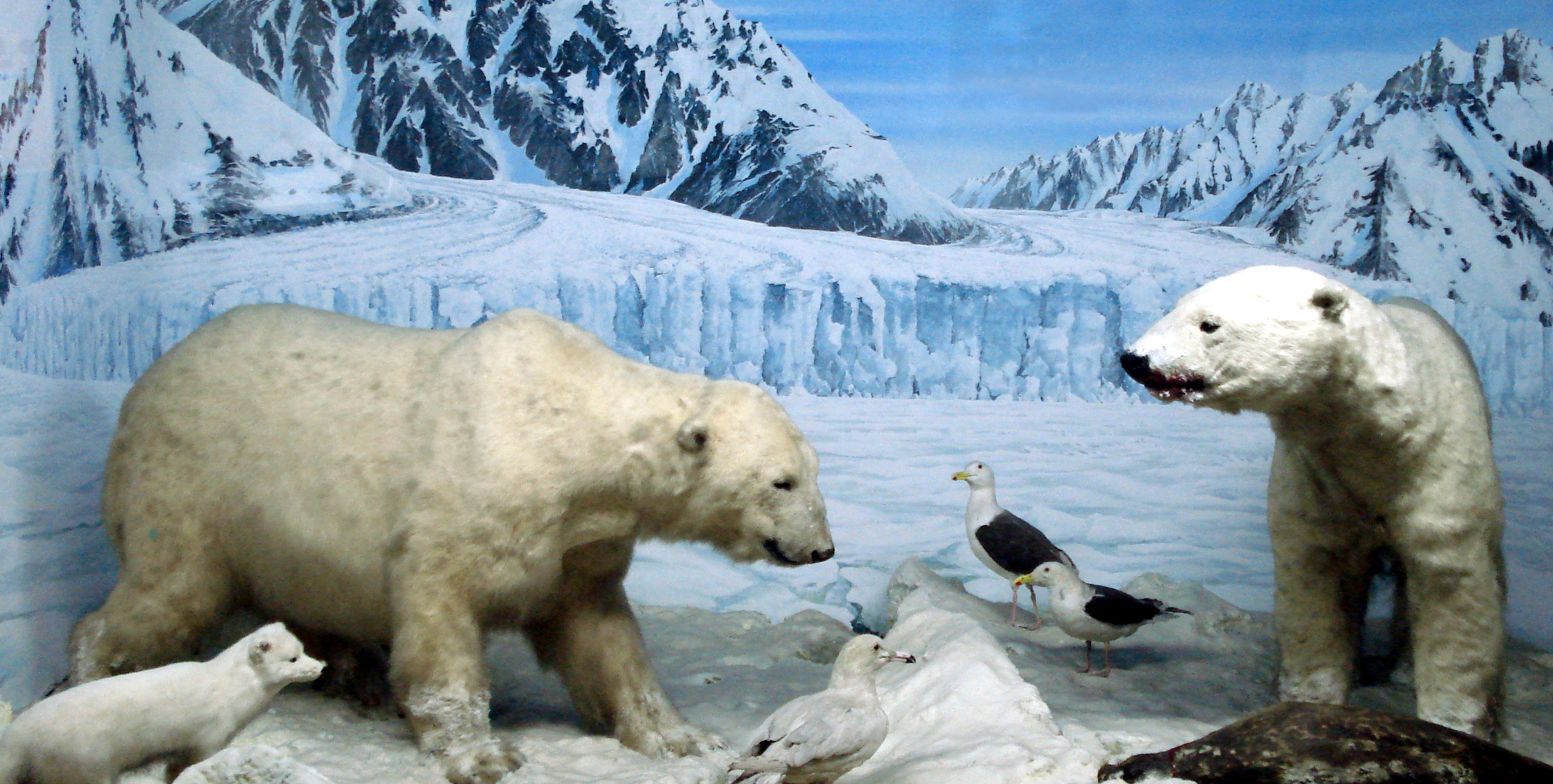
Mounted polar bears in a diorama

== See also ==
- Giuseppe De Cristoforis
- List of museums in Milan
- List of natural history museums in the World
- Lake Leffe
