= Giuseppe De Cristoforis =

Italian naturalist and collector

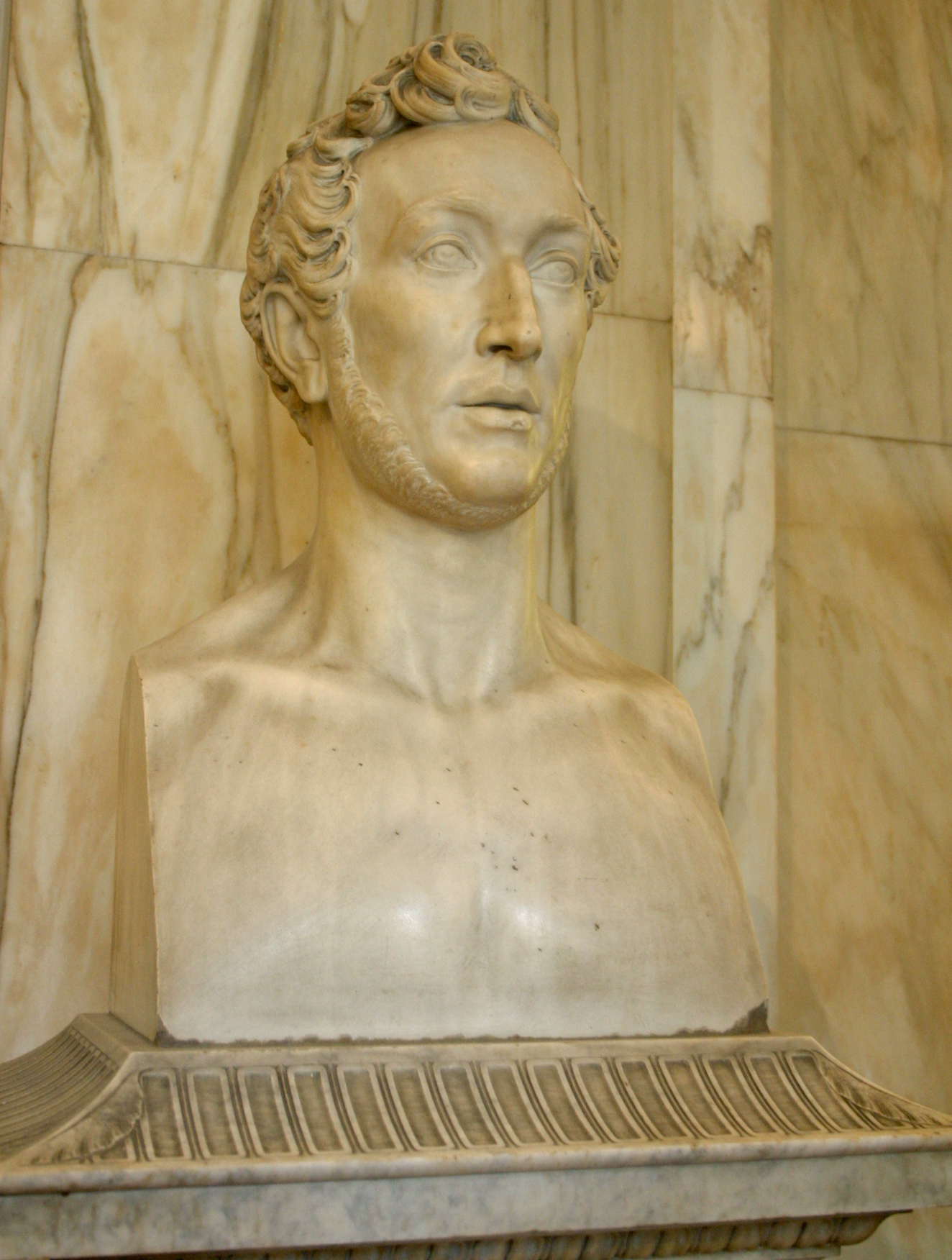
Portrait bust of Giuseppe De Cristoforis made by Abbondio Sangiorgio.

Giuseppe De Cristoforis (or De Cristofori) (11 October 1803 – 27 December 1837, also Milan) was an Italian naturalist and collector.

Also known as Joseph de Cristoforis or Giuseppe Cristofori, he was born in Milan. He studied entomology, specialising in Coleoptera. He was a natural history and insect dealer in Milan.

His collections, merged with those of Giorgio Jan, were the basis of Museo Civico di Storia Naturale of Milan. He bequeathed them to the city in 1832 on the condition that the municipality created a natural history museum curated by his friend Giorgio Jan.

He died at Milan in 1837.

== Works ==
- 1832 with G Jan Catalogus in IV. sectiones divisus rerum naturalium in museo exstantium Josephi de Cristofori et Georgii Jan. Sectio 2, [Conchyliologia]. Pars 1, [Conspectus methodicus Molluscorum. Fasc. 1., Testacea terrestria et fluviatilia].Mediolani
- 1832 with G Jan Catalogus in IV. sectiones divisus rerum naturalium in Museo exstantium Josephi de Cristofori et Georgii Jan .. : [Sectio III.a Entomologia, Pars I.a Conspectus methodicus insectorum, Fasc. I.us Coleoptera.
- 1832 Testacea terrestria et fluviatilia.Parmae, Typographia Carmignani, 1832 [Series:Parma. Museo di storia naturale di G.e de Cristofori e G.o Jan. Catalogus sect. 2 [Conchyliologia] pars 1, fasc. 1]
- 1832 with G Jan and Georges Cuvier, baron Il regno animale distribuito secondo la sua organizzazione opera del Baron Cuvier; compendiata e recata in lingua italiana per servir di base alla Storia naturale degli animali e d'introduzione al prodromo della Fauna dell'Italia superiore, compreso nei cataloghi sistematici e descrittivi della raccolte zoologiche. Parte IIa., I molluschi Parma : Stamperia Carmignani, 1832.
- 1832 with G Jan Descrizione dei generi degli animali : per servire d'introduzione al prodromo della Fauna dell'Italia superiore : compreso nei cataloghi del Museo di storia naturale / Parte IIa, fasc. Io, I molluschi terrestri e fluviatili. Parma : Stamperia Carmignani, [1832]
- 1832? with G Jan Enumeratio methodica plantarum exsiccatarum : quarum copiam offerunt anni 1832 mense Januario DeCristofori et Jan. Parma?

== Bibliography ==
- 1832. Testacea terrestria et fluviatilia.
