= Cristofori (surname) =

Cristofori is an Italian surname. Notable people with the surname include:

- Bartolomeo Cristofori (1655–1731), Italian musical instrument maker and inventor
- Carlo Cristofori (1813–1891), Italian cardinal
- Guido Cristofori (1880–?), Italian gymnast in the Gymnastics at the 1908 Summer Olympics – Men's team
- Nino Cristofori (1930–2015), Italian politician
- Pierpaolo Cristofori (born 1956), Italian modern pentathlete
