= Giorgio Jan =

Italian taxonomist, zoologist, botanist, herpetologist, and writer

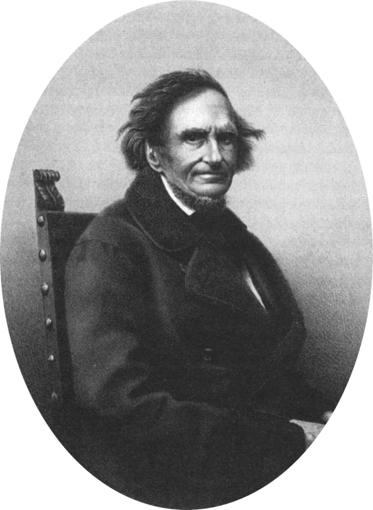
- Born: Giorgio Jan; 21 December 1791
- Died: 8 May 1866 (aged 74)

Giorgio Jan (21 December 1791 in Vienna – 8 May 1866, Milan) was an Italian taxonomist, zoologist, botanist, herpetologist, and writer. He is also known as Georg Jan or Georges Jan. He was the first director of the natural history museum in Milan.

== Biography ==
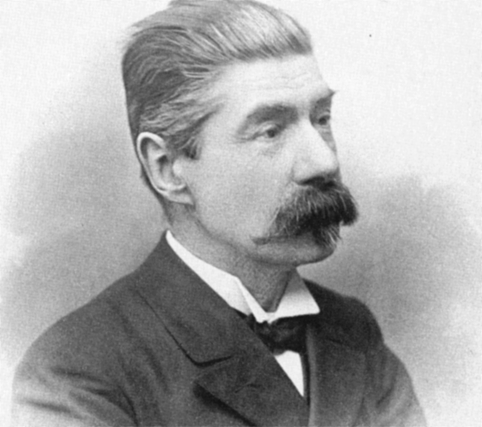
Ferdinando Sordelli.

After having been an assistant at the University of Vienna until 1816, Jan obtained the post of professor of botany at the university of Parma, as well as becoming Director of the botanical garden. Already in his time at Wien, he started offering herbaria for purchase to princely courts - an example being the Oesterreichs Flora (Flora Austriae), sent between 1815 and 1818 to Karl August, Grand Duke of Saxe-Weimar-Eisenach. In Parma, he continued to offer exsiccata-like series with plant specimens for sale, an example being the Herbarium portatile with the species list published in 1820. At that time, the Duchy of Parma was no longer under Austrian jurisdiction following the Congress of Vienna after the defeat of Napoleon at Waterloo. Giuseppe de Cristoforis died in 1837, bequeathing his collections to the town of Milan on condition that the municipality created a natural history museum whose direction had to be entrusted to Giorgio Jan, who offered his own collections. The Museo Civico di Storia Naturale di Milano was created the following year and is the oldest natural history museum in Italy. Later on, Jan engaged Ferdinando Sordelli (1837–1916), artist and naturalist, who illustrated his publications starting in 1860.

Jan's main interest was botany, but he made immense collections of natural history, including fossils and minerals. With Giuseppe de Cristoforis, he published many catalogues of specimens, often offered for sale or exchange. In these many new species, mainly insects and molluscs were described.

In the scientific field of herpetology he is credited with having described more than 85 new species of snakes, and is honoured by having several species and subspecies named after him, such as the Texas night snake (Hypsiglena jani), the Mexican pine snake (Pituophis deppei jani), Jan's shovelsnout snake (Prosymna janii), and Jan's centipede snake (Tantilla jani). In the 1860s, he began compiling what was to become the Iconographie Général des Ophidiens, an extensive illustrated collection of scientific papers relating to snakes, but he died before it was completed. The work was eventually finished and published in several parts by Sordelli.

== Publications (incomplete list) ==
- Iconographie Générale des Ophidians (1860–1866). (in French).
