= Borana National Park =

National park in Oromia Region, Ethiopia

- IUCN category II (national park)
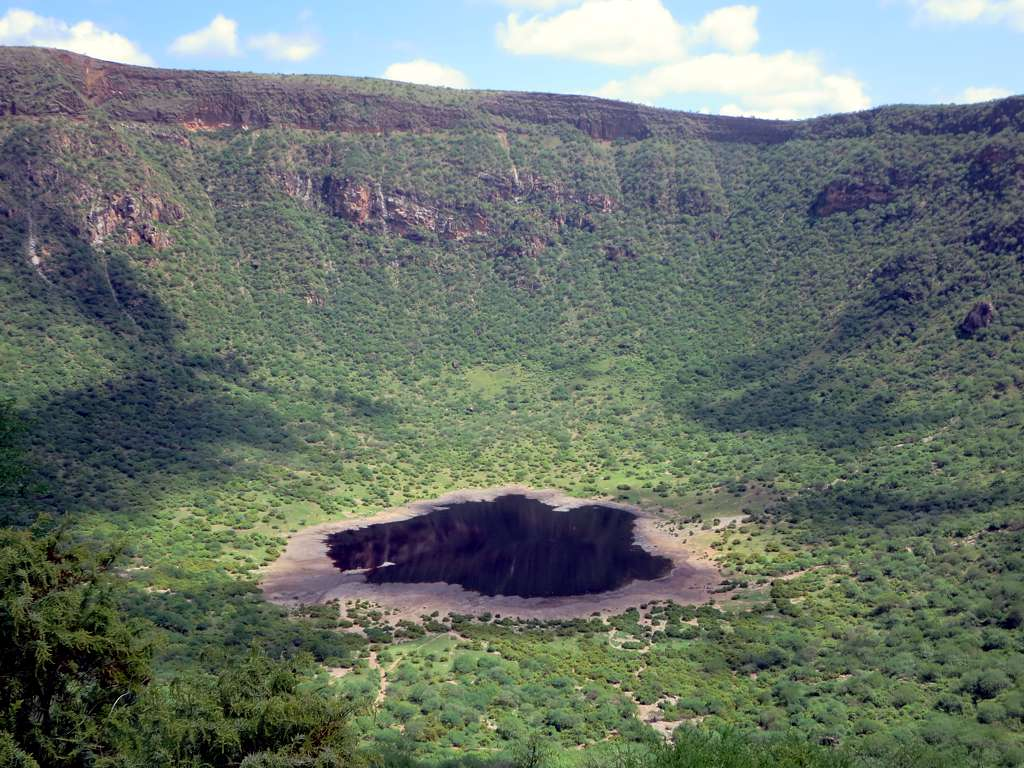
- The saline crater lake at El Sod

- Location within Ethiopia
- Location: Borena Zone of Oromia Region and Liben Zone of Somali Region, Ethiopia
- Nearest city: Yabelo; Moyale
- Coordinates: 04°07′N 38°34′E
- Area: 45,366 km^{2} (17,516 sq mi)
- Established: 1986
- Governing body: Oromia Forest and Wildlife Enterprise; Ethiopian Wildlife Conservation Authority

Borana National Park (also known as Borena National Park) is a wildlife sanctuary located in the Borena Zone of the Oromia Region in Ethiopia.

== Geography ==
Borana National Park is located in southern Ethiopia. It covers an area of 45,366 km^{2}. The park lies at the southern edge of the Ethiopian Highlands. It is bounded on the south by the Kenya–Ethiopia border. It adjoins Chelbi Wildlife Reserve to the west, Geraille National Park to the east, and Yabelo Wildlife Sanctuary and Arero National Forest Priority Area to the north.

The park conservation sites are divided into multiple blocks based on their biodiversity, community, and environment: Yabello, Dida-Hara, Gammedo, Danbala-Dhibayu, and Sarite blocks. The park is home to Booqee Sadeen, three maar lakes that were introduced as the main tourist attraction, including El Sod which is known for providing access to mineral water and salt varieties for the locals.

== Wildlife ==
=== Flora ===
Borana national park contains about 327 species discovered in Borena region which are distributed among 197 genera and 69 families are documented: 40% are trees/shrubs, 30% are forbs (non-woody plants other than grasses and sedges), 16% are grass, 10% are climbers, 2% are sedges, and 2% are succulents. Most of the park areas are part of the Somali Acacia–Commiphora bushlands and thickets ecoregion. The Ethiopian montane forests ecoregion extends into the north-central portion of the park and includes dry Afromontane regions located on the mountainous region close of Arero along with dry evergreen trees, and juniper trees. The Sarite block is mostly covered with widespread grassland and dry open savannah whereas the Dida-hara block contains drought-resistant woodlands that consisted of Boscia mossambicensis and Acacia tortilis.

=== Fauna ===
Borana National Park is home to at least 40 species of mammals. It is uniquely known for providing sanctuary for two separate species of zebras that are found within grasslands and woodland areas: the Plain zebras and the endangered Grevy's zebras. Other mammals that are rarely found in Borana National Park include lesser kudus, greater kudus, black-backed jackals, Beisa oryxes, gerenuks, warthogs, Soemmerring's gazelles, and Grant's gazelles. The herds of Swayne's hartebeest once thrived here but were extirpated from these regions.

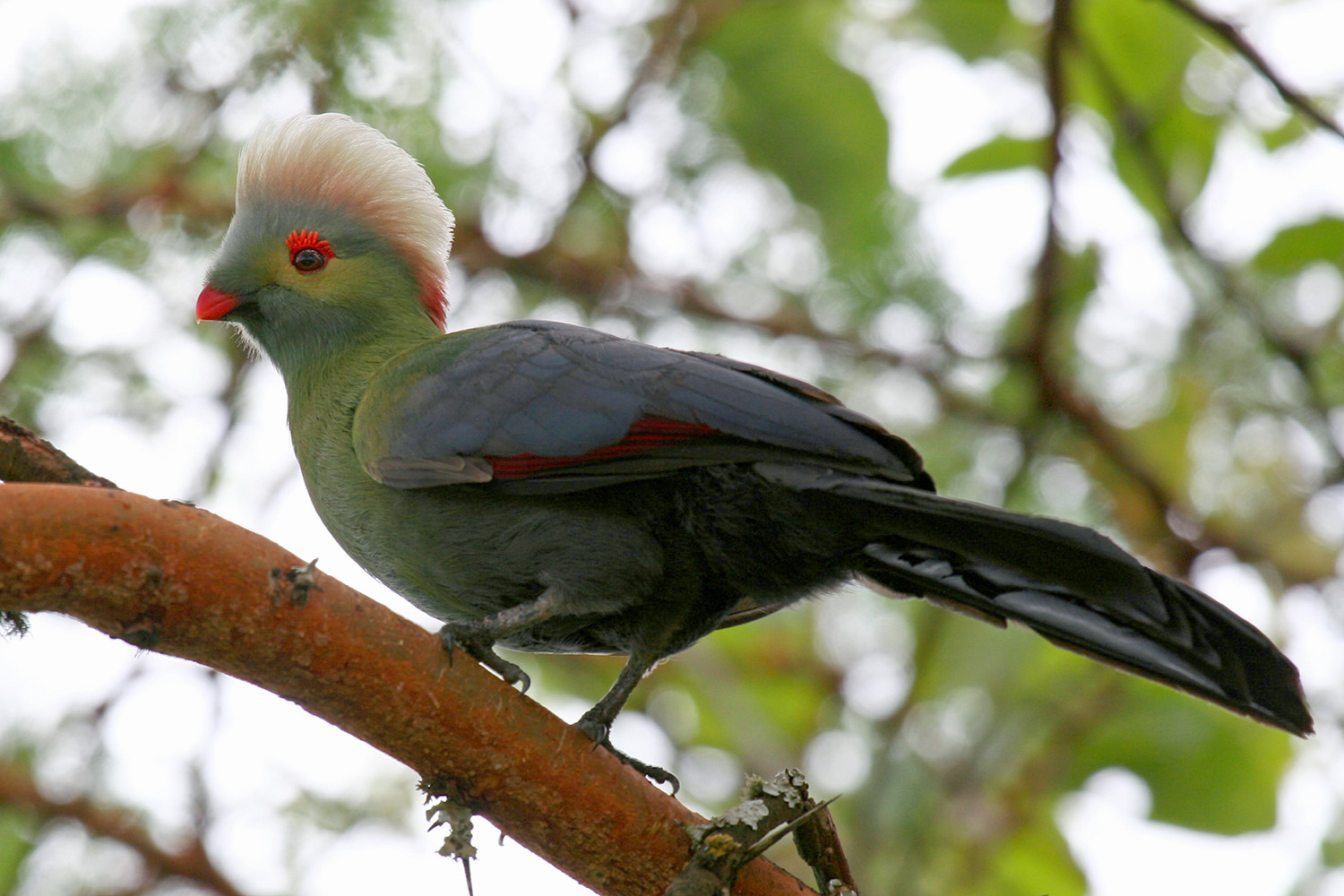
Ruspoli's turaco, one of the endemic bird species settled in Borana national park

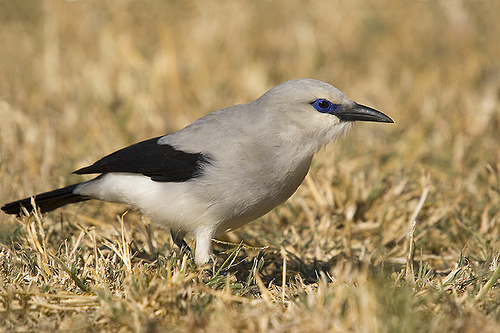
The Endangered Ethiopia Bushcrows from Yabelo settles Borana National Park as their home.

Similar to Yabelo Wildlife Sanctuary, Borana National Park provides multiple bird species recorded at least 280. Ethiopian bushcrows, white-tailed swallows, Prince Ruspoli’s turacoes, and black-fronted spurfowls are four endemic species found within the park that are considered endangered. Other birds include ostriches, short-tailed larks, Red-bellied parrots, Pringle's puffbacks, northern grey tits, eastern yellow-billed hornbill, Abyssinian grosbeak-canaries, Superb starling, vulturine guineafowl, Somali sparrows, black-capped social weavers, Donaldson Smith's nightjars, star-spotted nightjars, grey-headed social weavers, magpie starlings, little spotted woodpeckers, grey-headed silverbills, and tawny pipits are found within Borana National Park.

== Conservation ==
The park's area is established to help restore wildlife along with the community based on environmental recovery and ecological changes, which include repopulating zebra species, protecting the Bush crow's population, and drought prevention. During its establishment, the area was formerly designated as a controlled hunting zone and was later redesignated as a national park because of its poor management. The park is administered by the Oromia Forest & Wildlife Enterprise (OFWA) of the Oromia Region government along with the Ethiopian Wildlife Conservation Authority (EWCA). Today, the area was now facing multiple threats and challenges that might threaten the park's ecosystem such as droughts, invasive species expansions, livestock overgrazing, and road collisions.
