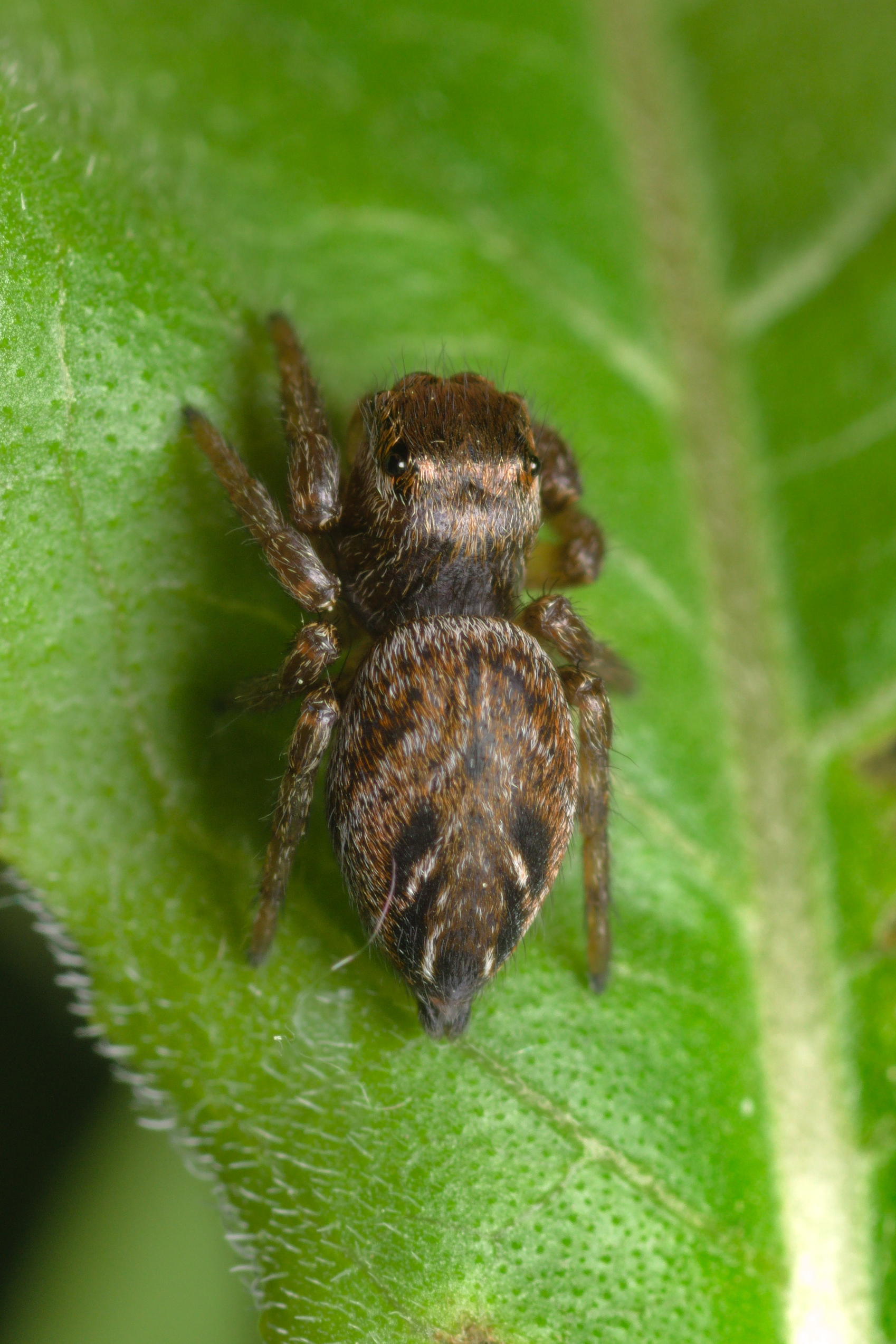
- The related Evarcha arcuata

Scientific classification
- Kingdom: Animalia
- Phylum: Arthropoda
- Subphylum: Chelicerata
- Class: Arachnida
- Order: Araneae
- Infraorder: Araneomorphae
- Family: Salticidae
- Genus: Evarcha
- Species: E. russellsmithi

Binomial name
- Evarcha russellsmithi Wesołowska & Tomasiewicz, 2008

= Evarcha russellsmithi =

Species of spider

Evarcha russellsmithi is a species of jumping spider in the genus Evarcha that lives in Ethiopia. The species was first described in 2008 by Wanda Wesołowska and Beata Tomasiewicz. The spider is small to medium-sized, with a cephalothorax measuring typically 2.2 mm (0.09 in) long and an abdomen 1.8 mm (0.07 in) long. The carapace is yellowish with dark rings around the spider's eyes. The abdomen is brown with an indistinct pattern of spots and lines. The legs are generally brown. The copulatory organs are distinctive. The male has a projection, or apophysis, from the palpal tibia that has a series of tooth-like features, and a very short embolus that is attached to another very small apophysis. The female has multi-chambered spermathecae and distinctive accessory glands.

== Taxonomy ==
Evarcha russellsmithi is a species of jumping spider that was first described by Wanda Wesołowska and Beata Tomasiewicz in 2008. It was one of over 500 species identified by the Polish arachnologist Wesołowska during her career, making her one of the most prolific authors in the field. They allocated it to the genus Evarcha, first circumscribed by Eugène Simon in 1902. The genus is one of the largest genera of jumping spiders, with members found on four continents.

In 1976, Jerzy Prószyński placed the genus in the subfamily Pelleninae of the family Plexippoida, along with the genera Bianor and Pellenes. In Wayne Maddison's 2015 study of spider phylogenetic classification, the genus Evarcha was moved to the subtribe Plexippina. This is a member of the tribe Plexippini, in the subclade Simonida in the clade Saltafresia. It is closer to the genera Hyllus and Plexippus. Analysis of protein-coding genes showed it was particularly related to Telamonia. In the following year, Prószyński added the genus to a group of genera named Evarchines, named after the genus, along with Hasarinella and Nigorella based on similarities in the spiders' copulatory organs. The species is dedicated to the arachnologist Anthony Russell-Smith.

== Description ==
Evarcha russellsmithi is a small to medium-sized with looks that are typical for the genus. The spider's body is divided into two main parts: a larger, almost rectangular cephalothorax and a smaller, rounded, almost pod-like abdomen. The male has a cephalothorax that is typically 2.2 mm (0.09 in) long and 1.7 mm (0.07 in) wide. The carapace, the hard upper part of the cephalothorax, is high and generally yellow. There are translucent and white hairs on the eye field and long dark bristles and black rings around the eyes themselves. The slopes of the carapace are brown and have grey and brown hairs. The underside, or sternum, is yellowish with a covering of short dark hairs in the middle. The spider's face, or clypeus, is brownish and has a scattering of white hairs on its cheeks. Externally, the spider's mouthparts, are distinctive. It has brownish chelicerae and yellowish labium, although the latter has lighter tips.

The spider's abdomen is smaller than the carapace, measuring typically 1.8 mm (0.07 in) in length and 1.3 mm (0.05 in) in width. The top is covered in brownish and whiteish hairs, amongst which are a scattering of long brown bristles. It is brown with a wide yellow stripe across the front. The remaining surface has a pattern of indistinct spots in the middle and stripes to the rear. The underside is greyish brown with four rows of yellow dots stretching down it from towards the front rearwards. The spider's spinnerets are grey. It has generally brown legs with brown hairs and long spines. The front legs are a bit longer than the others and darker. The other legs are marked with dark rings. The pedipalp is brownish grey.

The spider has distinctive copulatory organs. The male has a wide projection from the palpal tibia called a tibial apophysis. It is shaped like a shovel with two claw-like teeth about halfway along and a smaller tooth at the end. The palpal bulb is rounded with a bulge sticking out of the bottom and a very short forked embolus, the embolus joined to a very short apophysis with a membrane. The tibia has very long hairs, with shorter hairs projecting from the palpal bulb itself.

The female has a relatively small epigyne with simple copulatory openings situated in a central depression and a groove to the rear. Internally, the insemination ducts are narrow and sclerotized with complex many-chambered spermathecae. The accessory glands have a distinctive shape. The copulatory organs help to distinguish the species from others in the genus.

== Distribution and habitat ==
Evarcha spiders live across the world, although those found in North America may be accidental migrants. Although the genus is found across Africa, Evarcha rotundibulbis is endemic to Ethiopia. The holotype was found 60 km (37 mi) east of Nazret, East Shewa Zone, in 1986 at an altitude of 1,400 m (4,600 ft) above sea level. The spider lives amongst Acacia–Commiphora bushlands and thickets amongst woodland dominated by Acacia and Commiphora species.
