= Turati =

Turati is a surname. Notable people with the surname include:

- Augusto Turati (1888–1955), Italian journalist and politician
- Emilio Turati (1858-1938), Italian entomologist
- Filippo Turati (1857–1932), Italian sociologist, criminologist, poet and politician
- Hercules Turati or Ercole Turati (1829–1881), Italian banker and naturalist
- Marco Turati (born 1982), Italian footballer
- Stefano Turati (born 2001), Italian footballer

== See also ==
- The Defense § Major characters
