= Northern Acacia–Commiphora bushlands and thickets =

Ecoregion in eastern Africa

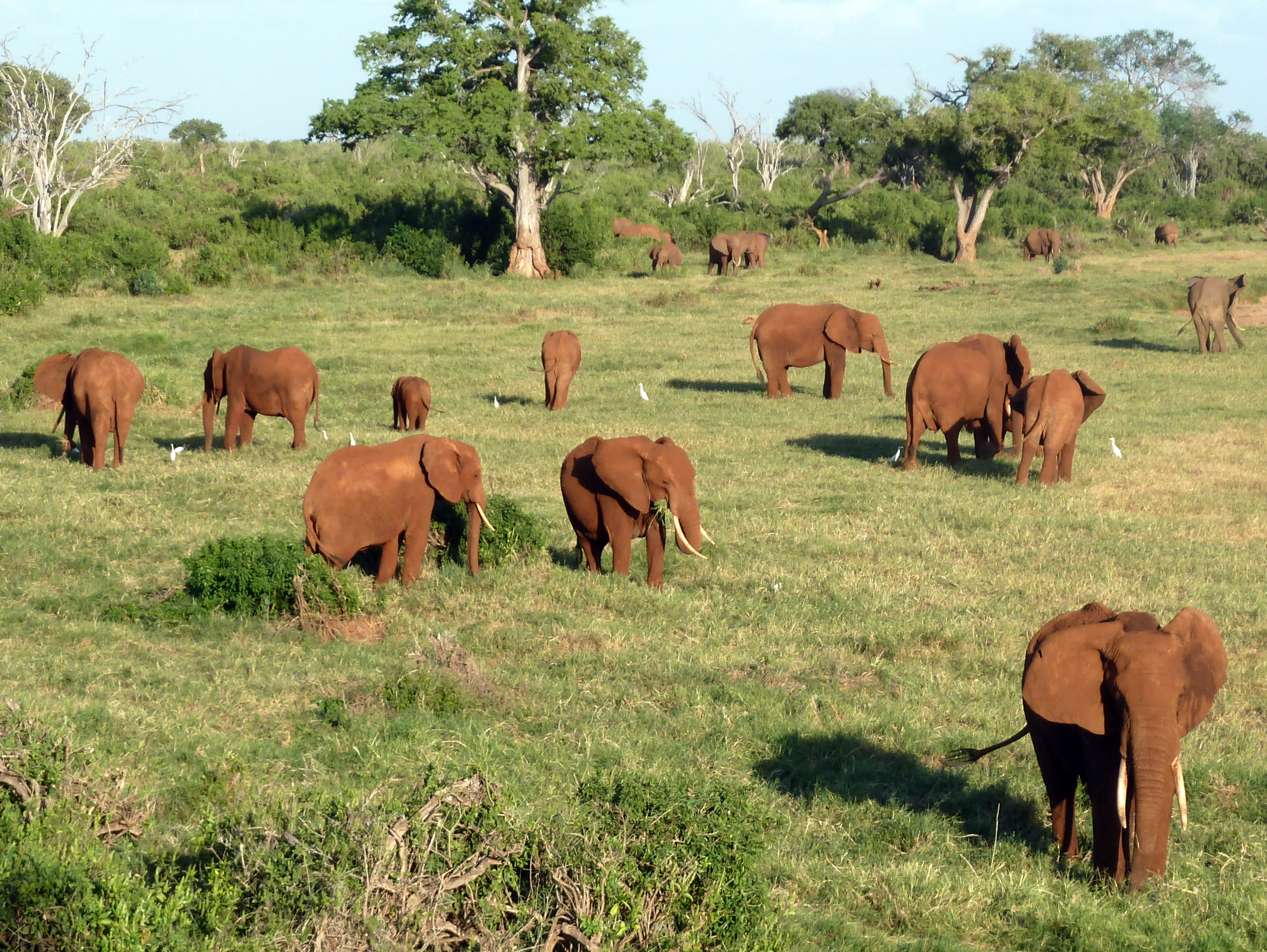
- Elephants in Tsavo East National Park

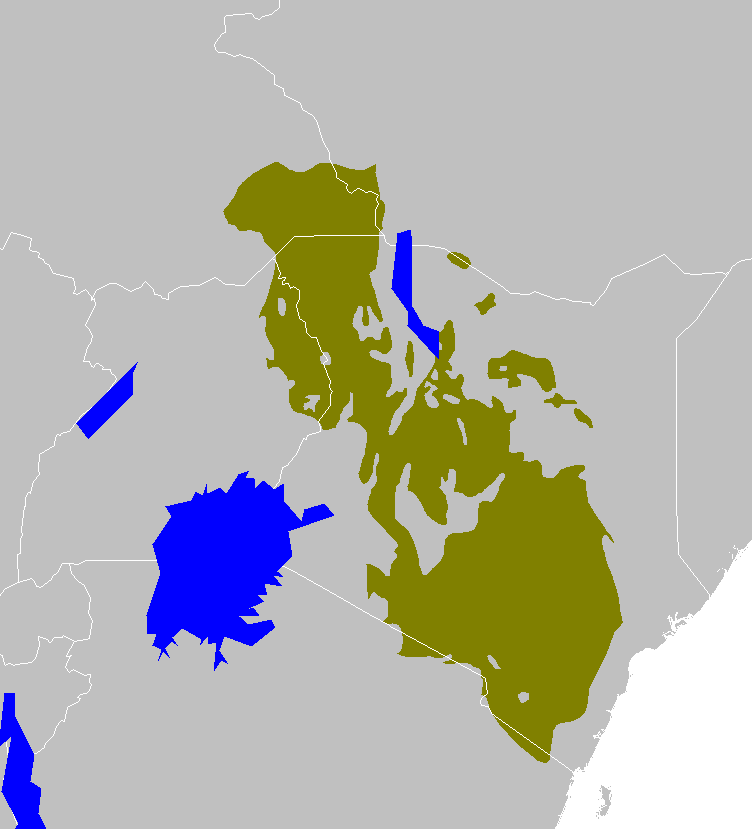
- Map of the Northern Acacia-Commiphora bushlands and thickets ecoregion

Ecology
- Realm: Afrotropical
- Biome: tropical and subtropical grasslands, savannas and shrublands
- Borders: List: East African montane forests; East Sudanian savanna; Masai xeric grasslands and shrublands; Northern Zanzibar–Inhambane coastal forest mosaic; Somali Acacia–Commiphora bushlands and thickets; Southern Acacia–Commiphora bushlands and thickets

Geography
- Area: 326,000 km^{2} (126,000 sq mi)
- Countries: Kenya, Ethiopia, South Sudan, Tanzania, Uganda

Conservation
- Conservation status: vulnerable
- Global 200: yes
- Protected: 20.46%

The Northern Acacia–Commiphora bushlands and thickets are a tropical grasslands, savannas and shrublands ecoregion in eastern Africa. The ecoregion is mostly located in Kenya, extending north into southeastern South Sudan, northeastern Uganda and southwestern Ethiopia and south into Tanzania along the Kenya-Tanzania border.

== Setting ==
The ecoregion occupies the middle and upper reaches of Kenya's Tana River watershed and the closed basins in the Kenyan portion of the East African Rift including those of lakes Magadi, Naivasha, Nakuru, Baringo and the uplands south and west of Turkana. Kenya's capital Nairobi is in the ecoregion.

The Northern Acacia–Commiphora bushlands and thickets are bounded on the southeast by the humid coastal Northern Zanzibar–Inhambane coastal forest mosaic along the lower Tana River and the Indian Ocean coast. To the south and southeast, they transition to the more humid Southern Acacia–Commiphora bushlands and thickets. To the east and northeast they transition into the drier Somali Acacia–Commiphora bushlands and thickets and Masai xeric grasslands and shrublands. East Sudanian savanna lies the northwest. In Kenya's mountains, the Acacia–Commiphora bushlands transition to humid East African montane forests at higher elevations.

== Flora ==
The ecoregion is mostly made up of grasslands, savannas and open-canopy woodlands. Species of Vachellia and Commiphora are the principal trees.

== Fauna ==
Elephants (Loxodonta africana) are major shapers of the ecoregion, knocking down trees for forage and opening up areas of grassland and savanna.

In addition to elephants, large mammals include the Eastern Black Rhinoceros (Diceros bicornis michaeli), Grevy’s Zebra (Equus grevyi), Beisa Oryx (Oryx beisa), Gerenuk (Litocranius walleri) and Lesser Kudu (Tragelaphus imberbis).

== Protected areas and conservation ==
20.46% of the ecoregion is in protected areas. Protected areas include portions of Kenya's South Turkana and Samburu national reserves, Maralal National Sanctuary and Amboseli, Chyulu Hills, Kora, Longonot, Marsabit, Meru, Nairobi, Ol Donyo Sabuk, Tsavo East and Tsavo West national parks. Tanzania's Umba and Mkomazi Game Reserves are in the ecoregion, as are Uganda's Matheniko and Pian Upe wildlife reserves.
