= Edgardo Moltoni =

Italian ornithologist

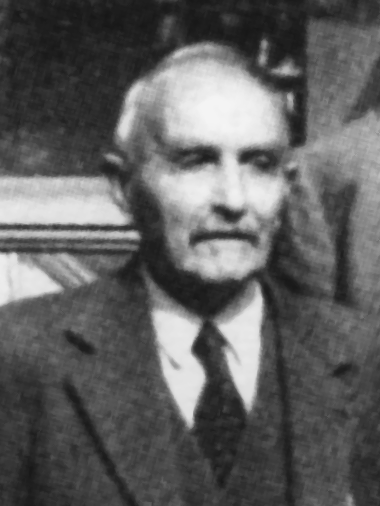

Edgardo Moltoni (5 June 1896 – 12 January 1980) was an Italian ornithologist who worked in the Natural History Museum at Milan. He worked at the museum collections for nearly fifty eight years and was the author of a four volume treatise on the birds of East Africa. Moltoni's warbler is named after him.

Moltoni was born in Oneglia, Liguria and studied natural sciences at the University of Turin and became an assistant to the chair in zoology and vertebrate anatomy at Sassari in 1920. In 1922 he moved to the natural history museum in Milan where he took charge of the collection of birds bequeathed by Ercole Turati. He became a deputy director of the museum in 1933 taking over from Giacinto Martorelli. He made collection expeditions in Italy and also in Italian colonies in Africa. In 1943, the museum was damaged heavily in an air raid and the collections were reorganized after the war along with Bruno Parisi, the director. Moltoni succeeded as director in 1952 and retired in 1962.

Moltoni was editor of the Rivista Italiana di ornitologia and published numerous papers and books including the four volume Gli uccelli dell’Africa orientale Italiana and described the genus Zavattariornis. He died of a heart attack while working at the natural history museum.
