= Bruno Parisi =

Italian zoologist and museum director (1884-1957)

Bruno Parisi (6 June 1884 – 26 January 1957) was an Italian zoologist and museum director. His main research field were the crustaceans (Crustacea). From 1928 to 1951 he was director of the Museo Civico di Storia Naturale di Milano.

== Career ==
Parisi was born in Taio. As a student at the University of Innsbruck, he was involved in a 1904 revolt by Italian students, who asked for an Italian-speaking university in Trieste, which was at that time under Austrian sovereign. Parisi was arrested, sentenced to three months in jail and then banned from all Austrian universities. Then he moved to Turin, where he graduated in natural sciences in 1908. In 1910 he became assistant in the Zoological Department of the Museo Civico di Storia Naturale di Milano, where he took over the management in 1921. In 1928, he was the successor of Ettore Artini (1866-1928) as the museum director, a post he held until his retirement in 1951.

Parisi studied a large collection of Japanese decapods (Decapoda), which the museum acquired from Alan Owston (1853-1915), a British merchant and collector of natural history objects based in Yokohama. He described 23 new taxa of decapods in the Zoological notices I decapodi giapponesi del museo di Milano, published from 1914 to 1919 in the Museum Journal. A further seven taxa first described by Parisi come from the Mediterranean and other regions.

During the air raids to Milan of Allied forces in August 1943, the museum was severely damaged by firebombs, whereby an important part of the collections and the library get lost. Parisi's office was also destroyed. From a collection of benthic decapods Parisi collected during a cruise to the Red Sea in 1923 and 1924, just a few glasses were saved, as well as a brief note on the mantis shrimps (Stomatopoda) collected during this expedition, which was published in 1940. After the war Parisi devoted to the reconstruction of the museum, where he was actively supported by his successor Edgardo Moltoni.

In 1924, Italian zoologist Oscar de Beaux commemorated Parisi in the epithet of Parissi's slit-faced bat (Nycteris parisii). In 1956, Dutch zoologist Lipke Holthuis named the Malagasy decapod genus Parisia in honor of Bruno Parisi. Parisi died in Roverè della Luna.
