= Masai xeric grasslands and shrublands =

Dry grasslands region in Africa

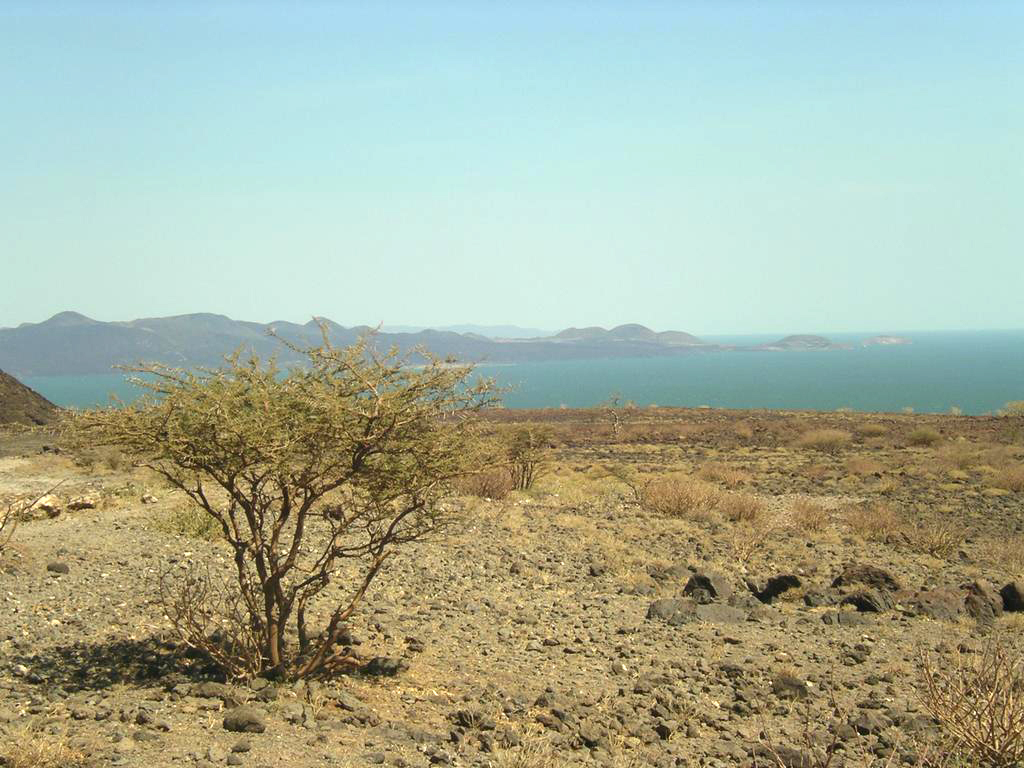
- Shrublands near Lake Turkana

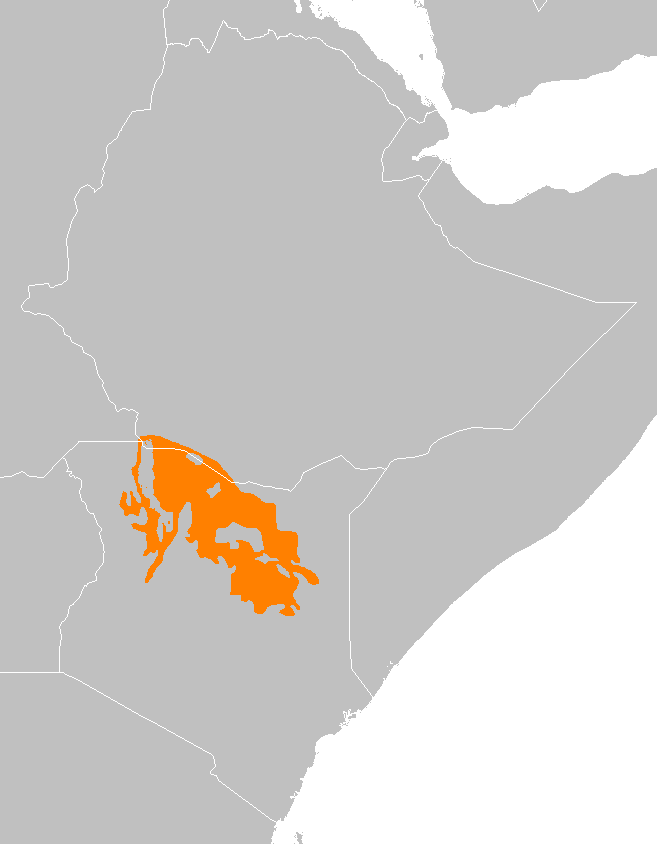
- map of the Masai xeric grasslands and shrublands

Ecology
- Realm: Afrotropical
- Biome: Deserts and xeric shrublands
- Borders: Northern Acacia–Commiphora bushlands and thickets; Somali Acacia–Commiphora bushlands and thickets

Geography
- Area: 101,000 km^{2} (39,000 sq mi)
- Countries: Kenya; Ethiopia

Conservation
- Conservation status: vulnerable

The Masai xeric grasslands and shrublands is a Desert and xeric shrubland ecoregion in Kenya and Ethiopia. It includes the lowlands around Lake Turkana and the Chalbi Desert east of the lake.

The ecoregion is surrounded by Acacia–Commiphora bushlands and thickets – the Northern Acacia–Commiphora bushlands and thickets to the south and west, and the Somali Acacia–Commiphora bushlands and thickets to the north and east.

== Protected areas ==
Protected areas include Lake Turkana National Parks in Kenya.
