= Yabelo Wildlife Sanctuary =

Wildlife sanctuary in Oromia Region, Ethiopia

- IUCN category II (national park)
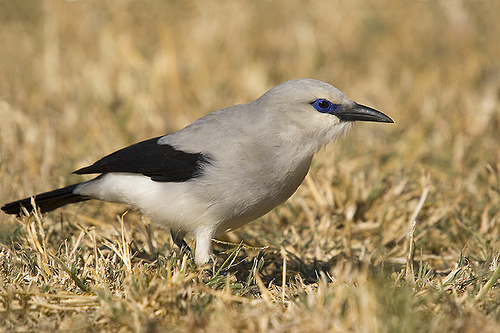
- Stresemann's bushcrow in Yabello Wildlife Sanctuary

- Location within Ethiopia
- Location: Borena Zone, Oromia Region, Ethiopia
- Nearest city: Yabelo
- Coordinates: 4°55′N 38°25′E
- Area: 2,496 km^{2} (964 sq mi)
- Established: 1985
- Governing body: Oromia Forest & Wildlife Enterprise (OFWA)

Yabelo Wildlife Sanctuary is a protected area and wildlife sanctuary in southern Ethiopia. It is located in the Borena Zone of the Oromia Region west of the town of Yabelo, having an area of 2,500 square kilometers and elevations ranging from 1430 to 2000 meters above sea level. The wildlife sanctuary borders on Borana National Park to the south.

== Ecology ==
=== Flora ===
The area of the sanctuary is notable for its red soils which have little organic matter. The general vegetation-type is Acacia savanna, the major trees being A. drepanolobium on black cotton soil, and A. brevispica and A. horrida on the slopes. There are also patches of Balanites aegyptiaca, and several species of Commiphora and Terminalia at the lower altitudes. The higher parts of the hills were formerly covered with forest dominated by Juniperus procera and Olea europaea cuspidata.

=== Fauna ===
Burchell's zebras are known to be abundant within the sanctuary along with small populations of Gerenuks, Grant's Gazelles, Beisa oryxes, and Günther's dik-diks. The park also provides a suitable habitat for Beisa oryx, Bohor reedbuck, bushpig, Ethiopian hare, Greater kudu, Lesser kudu, and warthog. Giraffes are one of the rare endangered species thought to thrive within the sanctuary but their population is uncertain and their presence is ambiguous. Carnivores including lion, leopard, cheetah, African wild dog, golden jackal, serval cat, side-striped jackal, spotted hyena, and Olive baboons.

==== Avifauna ====
Yabello Wildlife Sanctuary is home to 210 species of birds. Endemic species of birds found in this protected area include Stresemann's bushcrow and white-tailed swallow. Other birds that live within these areas include Ostriches, Short-tailed Larks, Pringle's puffbacks, Northern Grey Tits, Abyssinian Grosbeak Canary, Vulturine Guineafowls, Somali Sparrow, Black-capped Social Weavers, Donaldson Smith's Nightjars, Star-spotted Nightjars, Grey-headed Social Weavers, and Magpie Starlings.

== Conservation ==
Yabelo reportedly suffers from a great deal of deforestation, and illegal hunting of the spotted cats and ostrich is common. Some ex-servicemen have also settled within the sanctuary boundaries.
