= Hercules Turati =

Milanese banker and naturalist

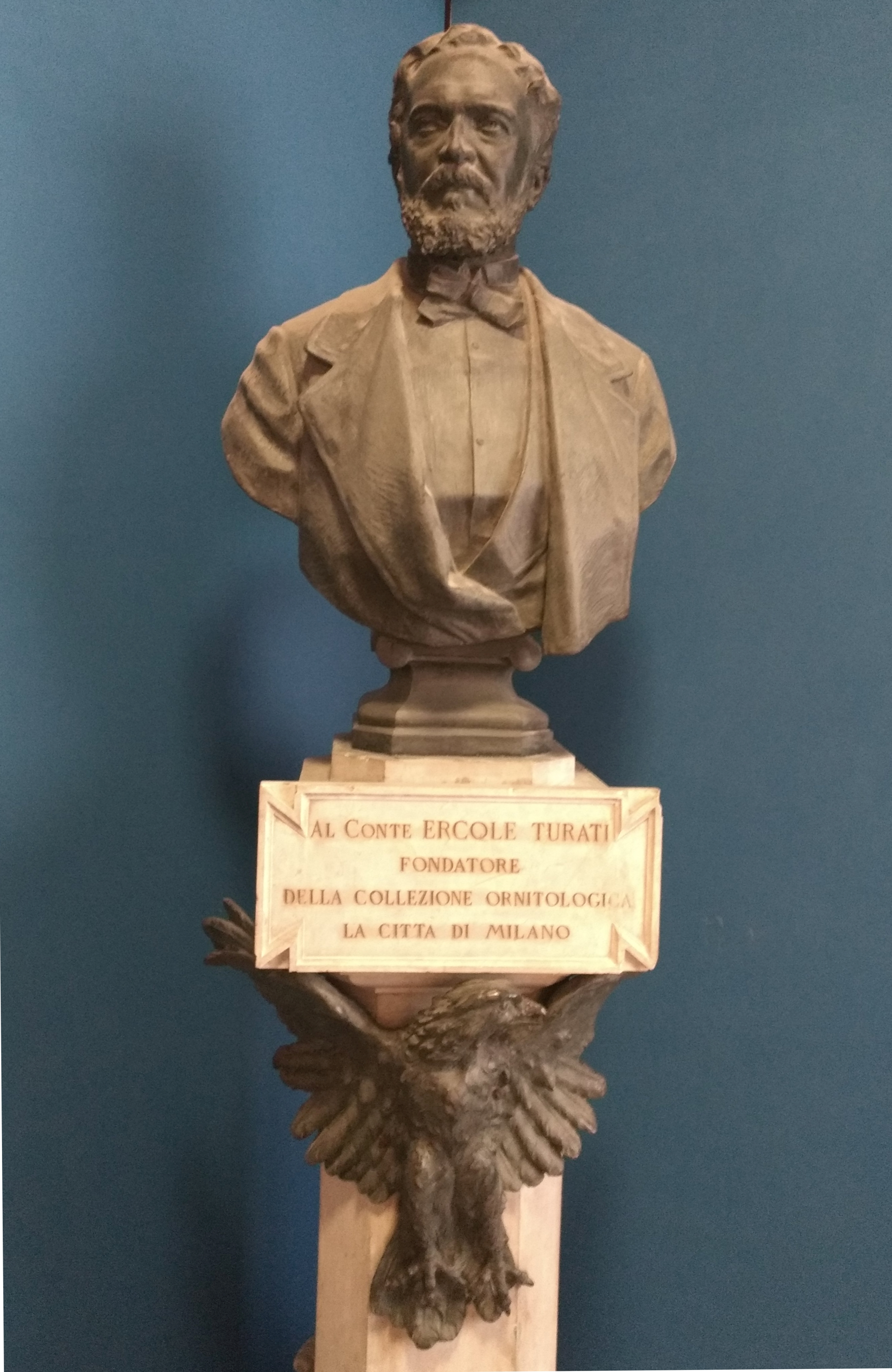
Bust of Turati

Count Hercules Turati or Ercole Turati (1829 –1881, Milano) was a wealthy Milanese banker and naturalist. He purchased natural history specimens and built up a very large private collection of more than 20,000 bird specimens, mostly mounted, which include the now extinct Great Auk. The Museo Civico di Storia Naturale di Milano was constructed to house the specimens that his heirs donated to the city after his death. A large number of specimens were however destroyed during an air raid in 1943.

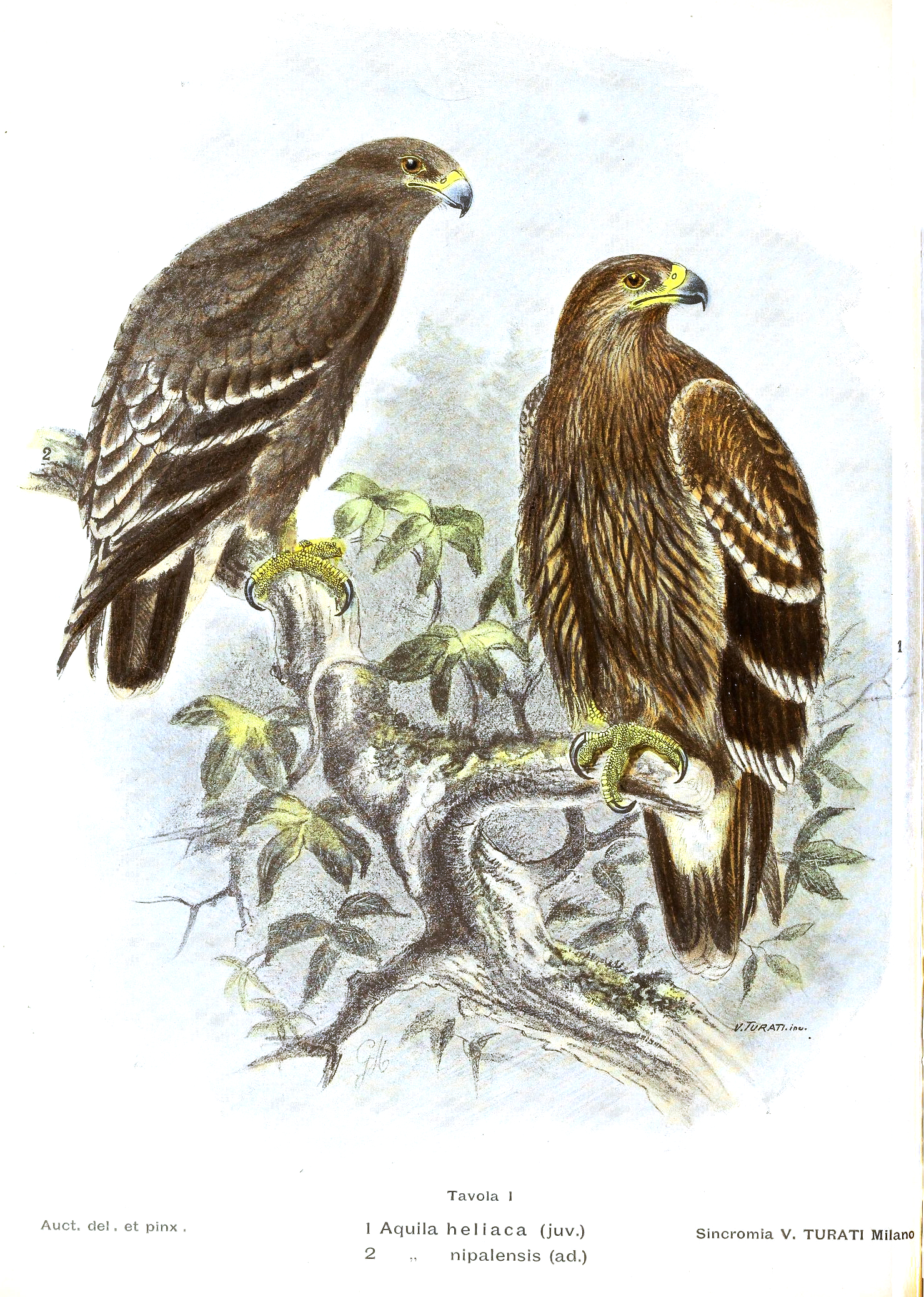
Illustration of Aquila nipalensis and A. heliaca by Vittorio Turati printed using the Sincromio process

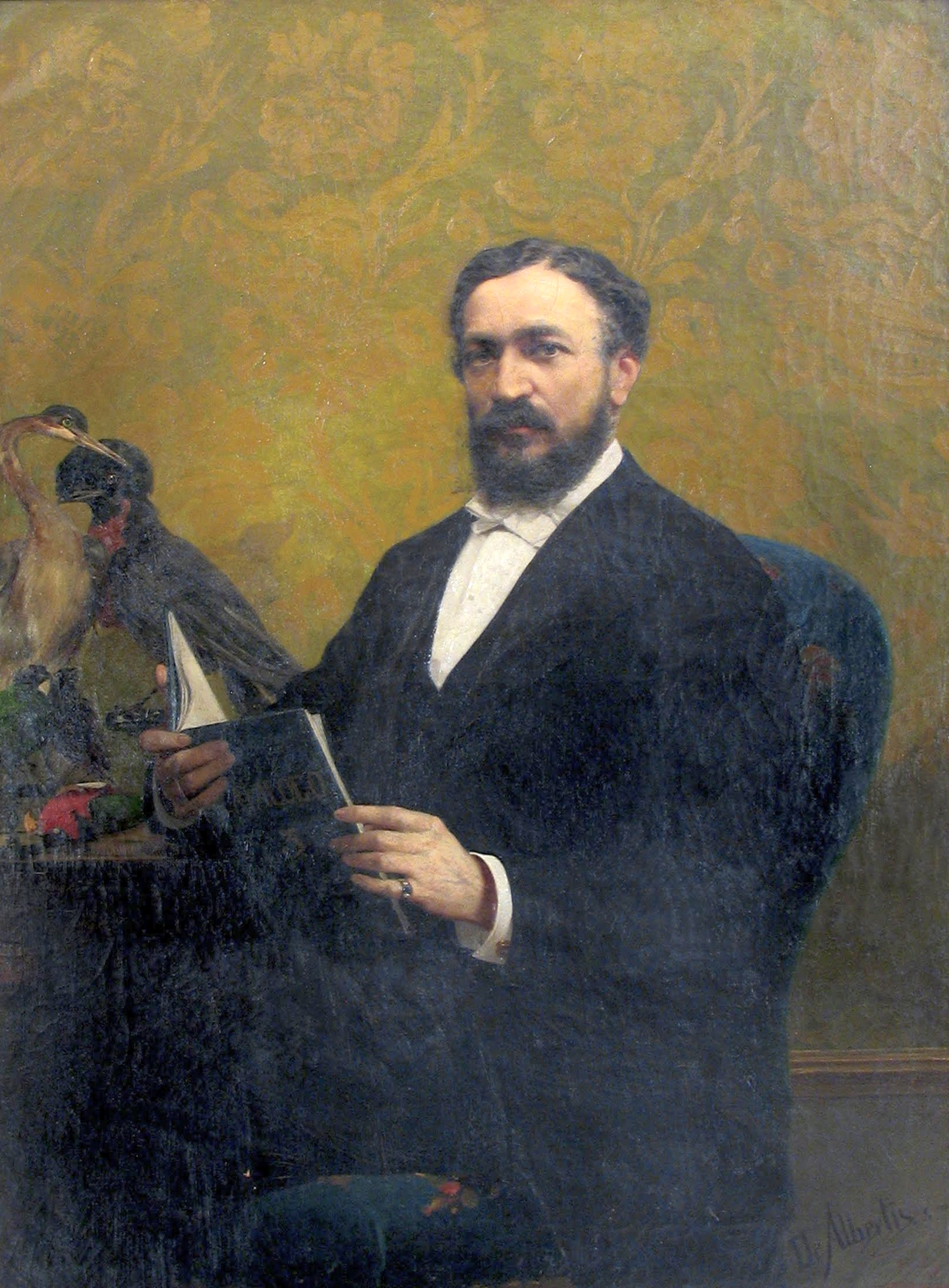
Portrait of Turati by Sebastiano De Albertis (1828–1897)

Along with his brother Ernesto, he also made collections of the nests and eggs of the birds of Lombardy. Along with Tommaso Salvadori, he described Pharomachrus xanthogaster in 1874 as the yellow-billed quetzal from Bogota which was considered later as a colour variant of Pharomachrus auriceps but may represent a hybrid. After his death, his collection was transferred to the Museo Civico di Storia Naturale di Milano which was constructed to house it. This collection was curated by Giacinto Martorelli and Edgardo Moltoni. Several species of birds are named after him including Picoides pubescens turati and Laniarius turatii. A brother, Vittorio Turati was a pioneer photographer who developed a process of printing varying tints called Sincromia or Synchromie. Some prints made using this process were included in Martorelli's catalogue of Turati's raptor collections. His son Emilio Turati (1858 - 1938) was an entomological collector.
