= Somali Acacia–Commiphora bushlands and thickets =

Ecoregion in the Horn of Africa

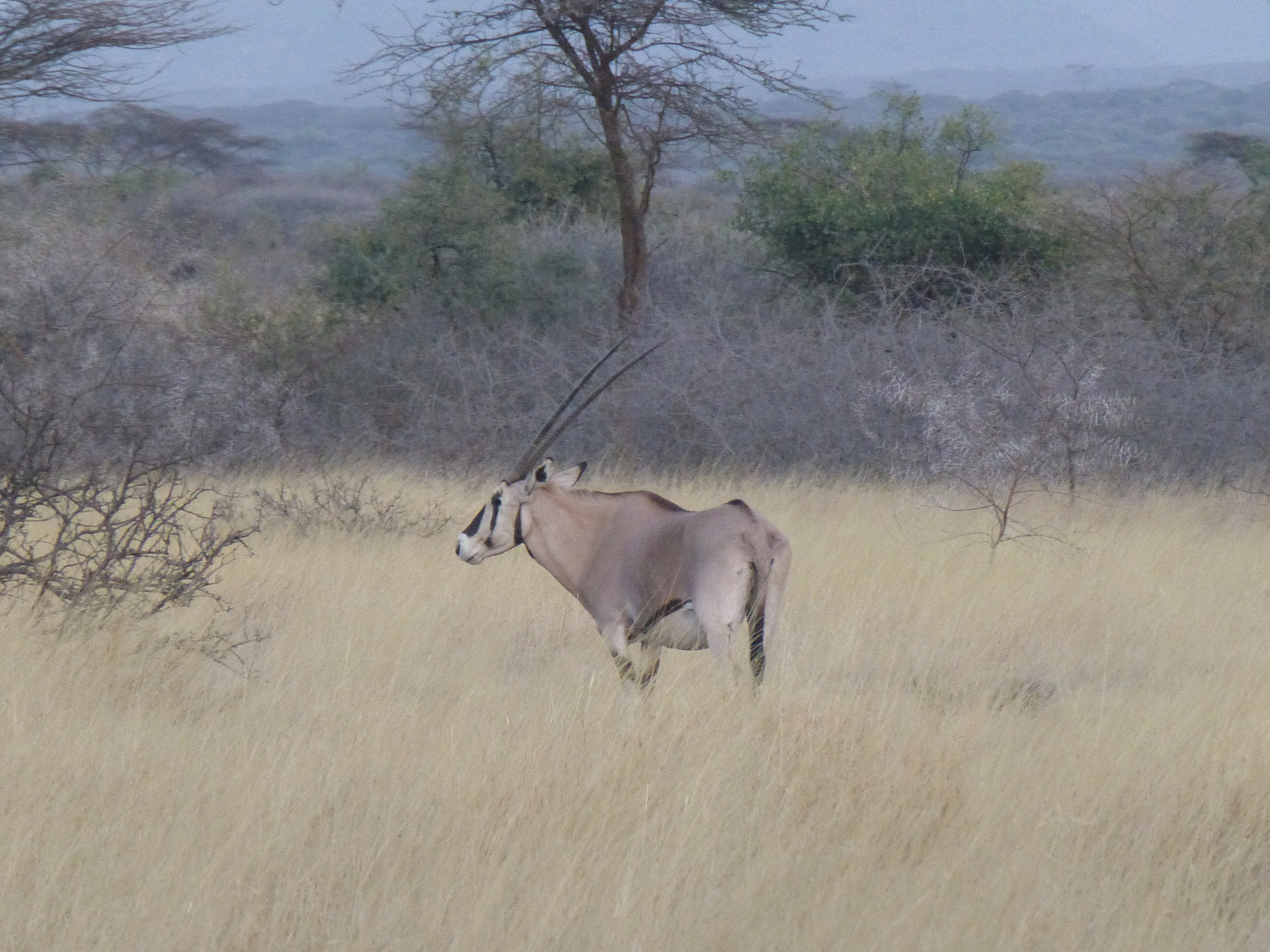
- East African Oryx (Oryx beisa) in Awash National Park, Ethiopia.

- Map of the Somali Acacia-Commiphora bushlands and thickets ecoregion

Ecology
- Realm: Afrotropical
- Biome: Tropical and subtropical grasslands, savannas, and shrublands Deserts and xeric shrublands
- Borders: List: Ethiopian montane forests; Ethiopian xeric grasslands and shrublands; Hobyo grasslands and shrublands; Northern Acacia–Commiphora bushlands and thickets; Northern Zanzibar–Inhambane coastal forest mosaic; Somali montane xeric woodlands

Geography
- Area: 1,053,300 km^{2} (406,700 mi^{2})
- Countries: List: Eritrea; Ethiopia; Kenya; Somalia; Somaliland; Sudan

Conservation
- Conservation status: vulnerable
- Protected: 10.88%

The Somali Acacia–Commiphora bushlands and thickets is a semi-arid tropical grasslands, savannas, and shrublands ecoregion in the Horn of Africa. It is home to diverse communities of plants and animals, including several endemic species.

== Setting ==
The Somali Acacia–Commiphora bushlands and thickets ecoregion occupies most of the Horn of Africa east and south of the Ethiopian Highlands, including eastern Ethiopia's Haud plateau and adjacent parts of Somaliland, Somalia and northeastern Kenya.

It also extends along the floor of the East African Rift, bisecting the Ethiopian highlands, and along the northeastern edge of the highlands into Eritrea and Sudan.

The ecoregion is bounded on the southwest by the Northern Acacia–Commiphora bushlands and thickets and the Masai xeric grasslands and shrublands. To the south, it is bounded by the humid Northern Zanzibar–Inhambane coastal forest mosaic in the lower Shebelle–Jubba River valley. The Hobyo grasslands and shrublands occupy a narrow strip of coastal dunes along Somalia's central Indian Ocean coast. To the northeast, the Somali montane xeric woodlands occupy the Ogo Mountains along Somalia’s northern coast, and the Ethiopian xeric grasslands and shrublands occupy the lowlands along the Red Sea. Between 1100 and 1500 meters elevation in the Ethiopian Higlands, the Acacia–Commiphora woodlands transition to the Ethiopian montane forests.

== Climate ==
The ecoregion has a hot semi-arid to hot desert climate. Rainfall ranges from below 100 mm annually in the Ogaden to 600 mm on the lower slopes of the Ethiopian Highlands. Rainfall can be erratic and vary widely from year to year.

== Flora ==
The plant communities include woodlands, shrublands, grasslands, and thickets. The predominant trees are deciduous species of Acacia and Commiphora, with a low herbaceous understory. Dactyloctenium aegyptium and Panicum turgidum are the principal grass species. Where rainfall is lower, the Acacia–Commiphora woodlands yield to low bushlands and grasslands.

== Fauna ==
The ecoregion is home to many species of gazelle, including the endemic dibatag (Ammodorcas clarkei, VU), beira (Dorcatragus megalotis, VU), hirola (Damaliscus hunteri, CR) and Speke's gazelle (Gazella spekei, VU).

== Protected areas and conservation ==
10.88% of the ecoregion is in protected areas. Protected areas include Yangudi Rassa National Park, Nechisar National Park, Awash National Park, Omo National Park, Mago National Park, Borena National Park, Chelbi Wildlife Reserve, Babille Elephant Sanctuary, Senkelle Swayne's Hartebeest Sanctuary, and Yabello Sanctuary in Ethiopia, Malka Mari National Park in Kenya, and the Alifuuto Nature Reserve in Somalia.
