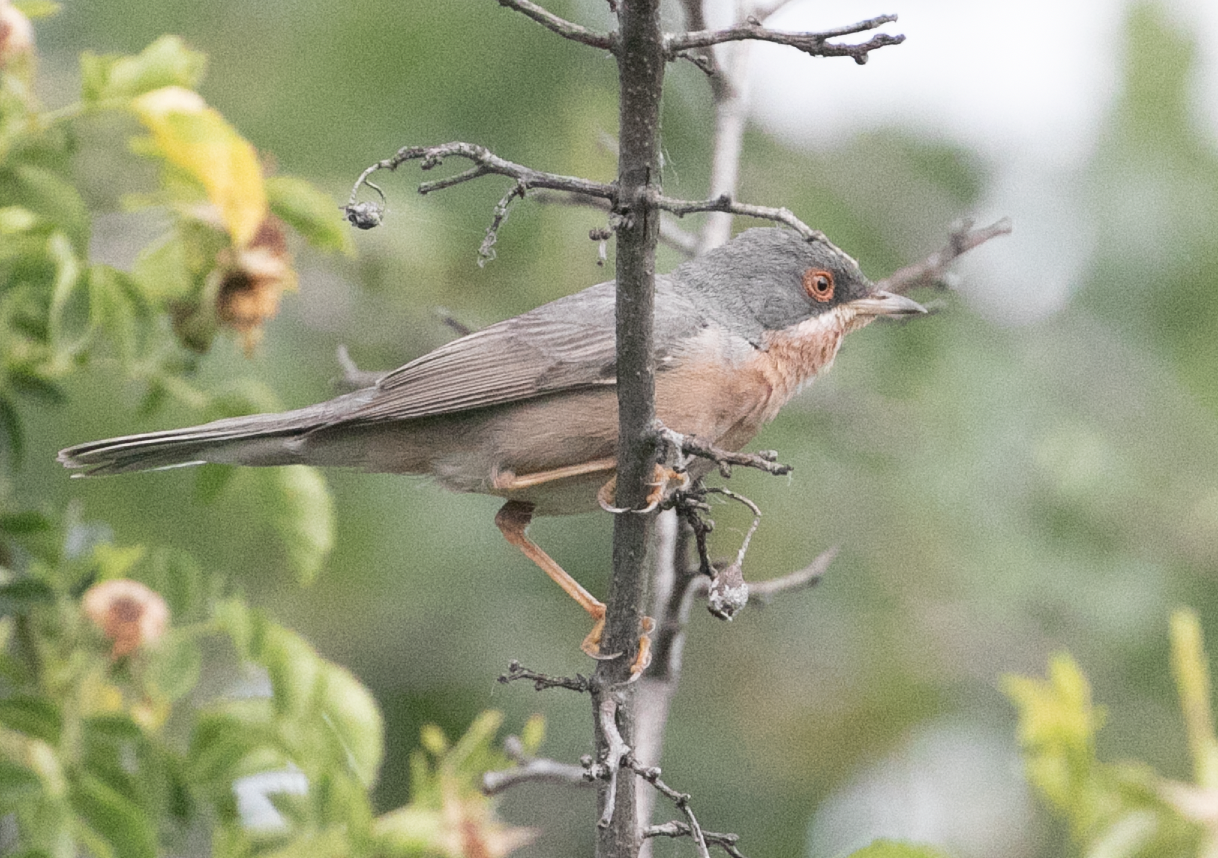

Conservation status
- Least Concern (IUCN 3.1)

Scientific classification
- Kingdom: Animalia
- Phylum: Chordata
- Class: Aves
- Order: Passeriformes
- Family: Sylviidae
- Genus: Curruca
- Species: C. subalpina

Binomial name
- Curruca subalpina (Temminck, 1820)

Synonyms
- Sylvia moltonii; Sylvia subalpina; Sylvia cantillans moltonii

= Moltoni's warbler =

Species of bird

Moltoni's warbler (Curruca subalpina) is a small bird species belonging to the family Sylviidae, often referred to as the typical warblers. This species is native to Italy and islands of the Tyrrhenian Sea.

== Taxonomy ==
Moltoni's warbler was first formally described as Sylvia subalpina in 1820 by the Dutch zoologist Coenraad Jacob Temminck from specimens collected in Northern Italy. In 1937 C. Orlando named a subspecies of the subalpine warbler Sylvia cantillans moltonii from Sardinia and this is now regarded as a synonym of Temminck's name. This taxon was regarded as a synonym of the subalpine water (Sylvia cantillans) until the 2000s when morphological, phylogenetic and biogeographical data were used to show that Moltoni's Warbler was a valid species which bred sympatrically with Sylvia cantillans. The result was that the subalpine warbler sensu lato was split into three species, the Western subalpine warbler (Curruca iberiae), the Eastern subalpine warbler (Curruca cantillans) and Moltoni's warbler. This species is classified in the genus Curruca in the family Sylviidae.

== Etymology ==
The specific name subalpina is Latin for "below the mountains". The common name honours the Italian ornithologist Edgardo Moltoni.

== Description ==
Moltoni's warbler is similar to the Western subalpine warbler. In the males the underparts in Moltoni's warbler are salmon pink while that of the Western subalpine warbler are orange. The females and juveniles are almost identical to those of the Western subalpine warbler. The main difference is vocalisations with the song of Moltoni's warbler being described as being faster paced and higher pitched than that of Western subalpine warbler, making a sound that is a rapid succession of insect-like notes, with the normal dry "trill zerr" call included in the song.

== Distribution and habitat ==
Moltoni's warbler breeds around the Tyrrhenian Sea in the Mediterranean Sea on the Balearic Islands, Corsica, Sardinia and in northern Italy wintering in the western Sahel in between the Atlantic coast and Niger and northern Nigeria. It is a vagrant in northwestern Europe. It breeds in Mediterranean scrubland and winters in semiarid savanna dominated by acacia.
