= Turati's boubou =

Conservation status
- Least Concern (IUCN 3.1)

Scientific classification
- Kingdom: Animalia
- Phylum: Chordata
- Class: Aves
- Order: Passeriformes
- Family: Malaconotidae
- Genus: Laniarius
- Species: L. turatii

Binomial name
- Laniarius turatii (Verreaux, 1858)

Species of bird

Turati's boubou (Laniarius turatii) is a species of bird in the family Malaconotidae. It is found in Guinea, Guinea-Bissau, and Sierra Leone. Its natural habitat is moist savanna.

The common name and Latin binomial commemorates the Milanese banker Ercole Turati (1829-1881) who also collected natural history specimens.
