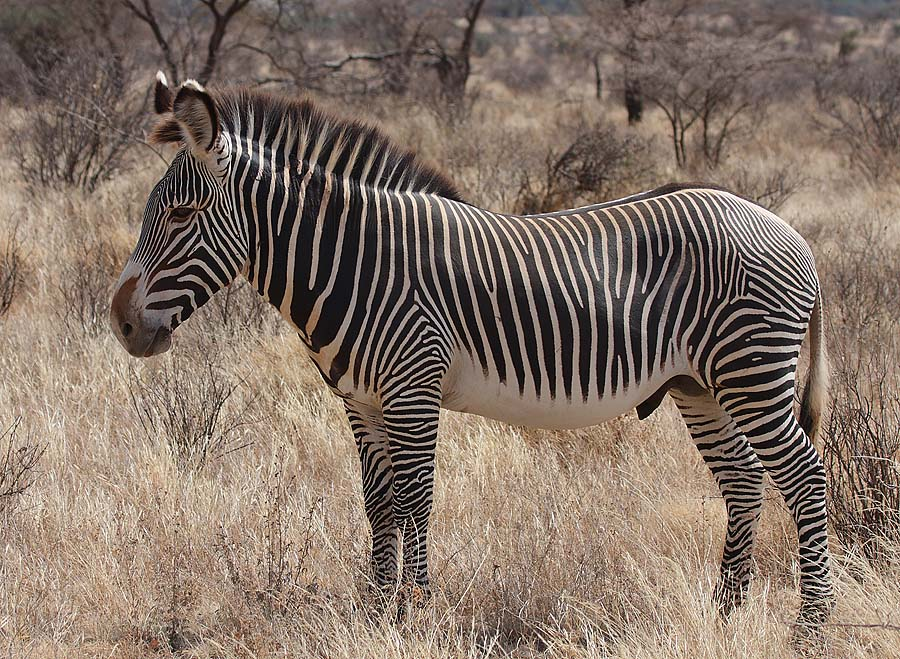
- A Grévy's zebra at Buffalo Springs National Reserve

Conservation status
- Endangered (IUCN 3.1)
- CITES Appendix I

Scientific classification
- Kingdom: Animalia
- Phylum: Chordata
- Class: Mammalia
- Order: Perissodactyla
- Family: Equidae
- Genus: Equus
- Subgenus: Hippotigris
- Species: E. grevyi

Binomial name
- Equus grevyi Oustalet, 1882
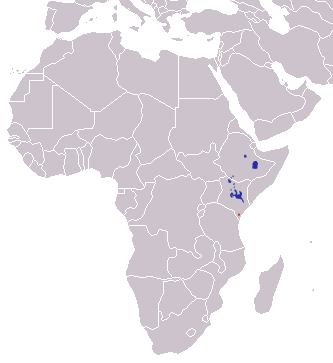
- Grévy's zebra range native introduced

= Grévy's zebra =

Grévy's zebra Temporal range: Middle Pleistocene – Recent

Species of zebra

Grévy's zebra (Equus grevyi), also known commonly as the imperial zebra, is the largest living species of wild equid and the most threatened of the three species of zebras, the other two being the plains zebra and the mountain zebra. Named after French president Jules Grévy, it is found in parts of Kenya and Ethiopia. Superficially, Grévy's zebra's physical features can help to identify it from the other zebra species; its overall appearance is slightly closer to that of a mule and donkey, compared to the more "equine" (horse) appearance of the plains and mountain zebras. Compared to other zebra species, Grévy's zebra is the tallest; it has mule-like, larger ears, and has the narrowest stripes of all zebras. It has a distinctively erect mane, and a more slender snout.

Grévy's zebra lives in semi-arid savanna, where it feeds on grasses, legumes, and browse, such as acacia; it can survive up to five days without water. It differs from the other zebra species in that it does not live in a harem, and it maintains few long-lasting social bonds. Stallion territoriality and mother–foal relationships form the basis of the social system of the Grévy's zebra. Despite a handful of zoos and animal parks around the world having had successful captive-breeding programs, in its native home this zebra is listed by the IUCN as endangered. Its population has declined from 15,000 to 2,000 since the 1970s. In 2016, the population was reported to be "stable"; however, as of 2020, the wild numbers are still estimated at only around 2,250 animals, in part due to anthrax outbreaks in eastern Africa.

== Taxonomy and naming ==
The Grévy's zebra was first described by French naturalist Émile Oustalet in 1882. He named it after Jules Grévy, then president of France, who, in the 1880s, was given one as a gift by the government of Ethiopia. Traditionally, this species was classified in the subgenus Dolichohippus with plains zebra and mountain zebra in Hippotigris. Groves and Bell (2004) place all three species in the subgenus Hippotigris.

Fossils of zebra-like equids have been found throughout Africa and Asia in the Pliocene and Pleistocene deposits. Notable examples include E. sanmeniensis from China, E. cautleyi from India, E. valeriani from central Asia and E. oldowayensis from East Africa. The latter, in particular is very similar to the Grévy's zebra and may have been its ancestor. The modern Grévy's zebra arose in the Middle Pleistocene. Zebras appear to be a monophyletic lineage and recent (2013) phylogenies have placed Grévy's zebra in a sister taxon with the plains zebra. In areas where Grévy's zebras are sympatric with plains zebras, the two may gather in same herds and fertile hybrids do occur.

== Description ==
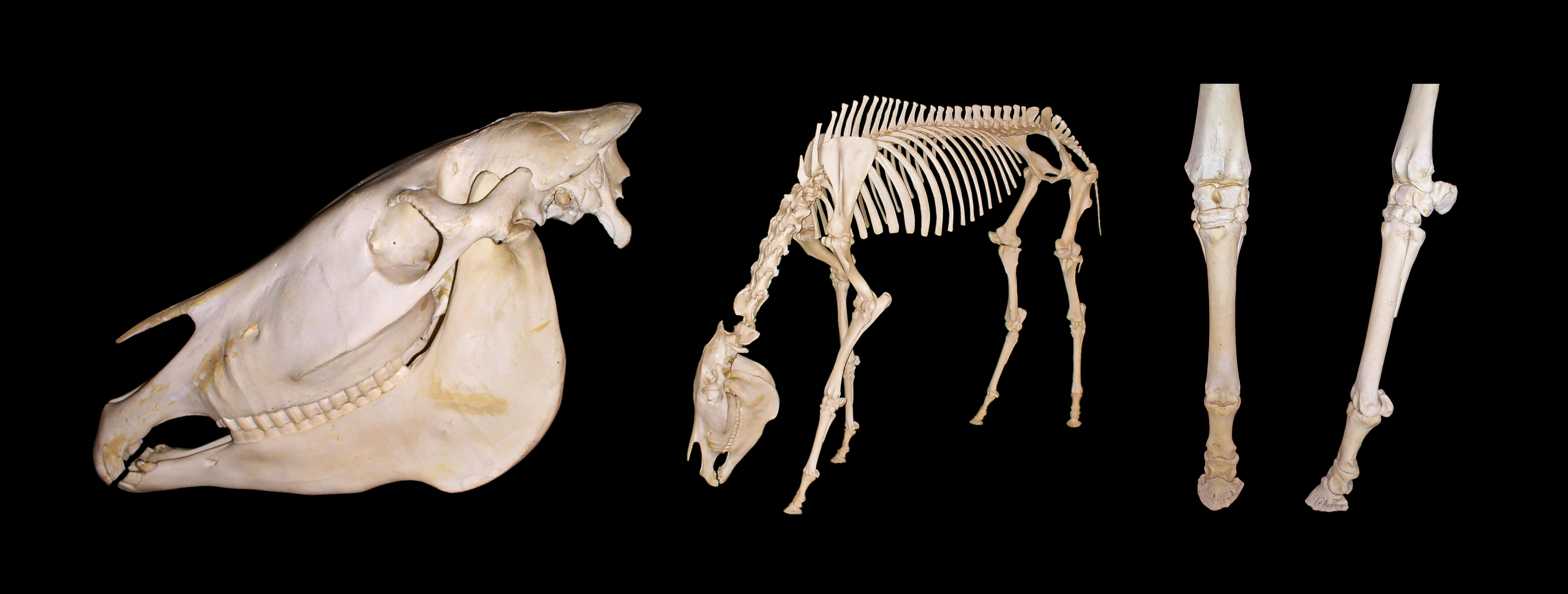
From left to right: a cranium, a complete skeleton, a left forefoot frontal, and a left forefoot lateral from a Grévy's zebra

Grévy's zebra is the largest of all wild equines. It is 2.5–2.75 m (8.2–9.0 ft) in head-body length, with a tail 55–75 cm (1.80–2.46 ft) long, stands 1.45–1.6 m (4.8–5.2 ft) high at the withers, and weighs 350–450 kg (770–990 lb). Grévy's zebra differs from the other two zebras in its more primitive characteristics. It is particularly mule-like in appearance; the head is large, long, and narrow with elongated nostril openings; the ears are very large, rounded, and conical, and the neck is short but thick. The muzzle is ash-grey to black in colour, and the lips are whiskered. The mane is tall and erect; juveniles have a mane that extends to the length of the back and shortens as they reach adulthood.

As with all zebra species, Grévy's zebra's pelage has a black and white striping pattern. The stripes are narrow and close-set, broader on the neck, and extending to the hooves. The belly and the area around the base of the tail lack stripes and are just white in color, which is unique to the Grévy's zebra. Foals are born with brown and white striping, with the brown stripes darkening as they grow older.

== Range and ecology ==
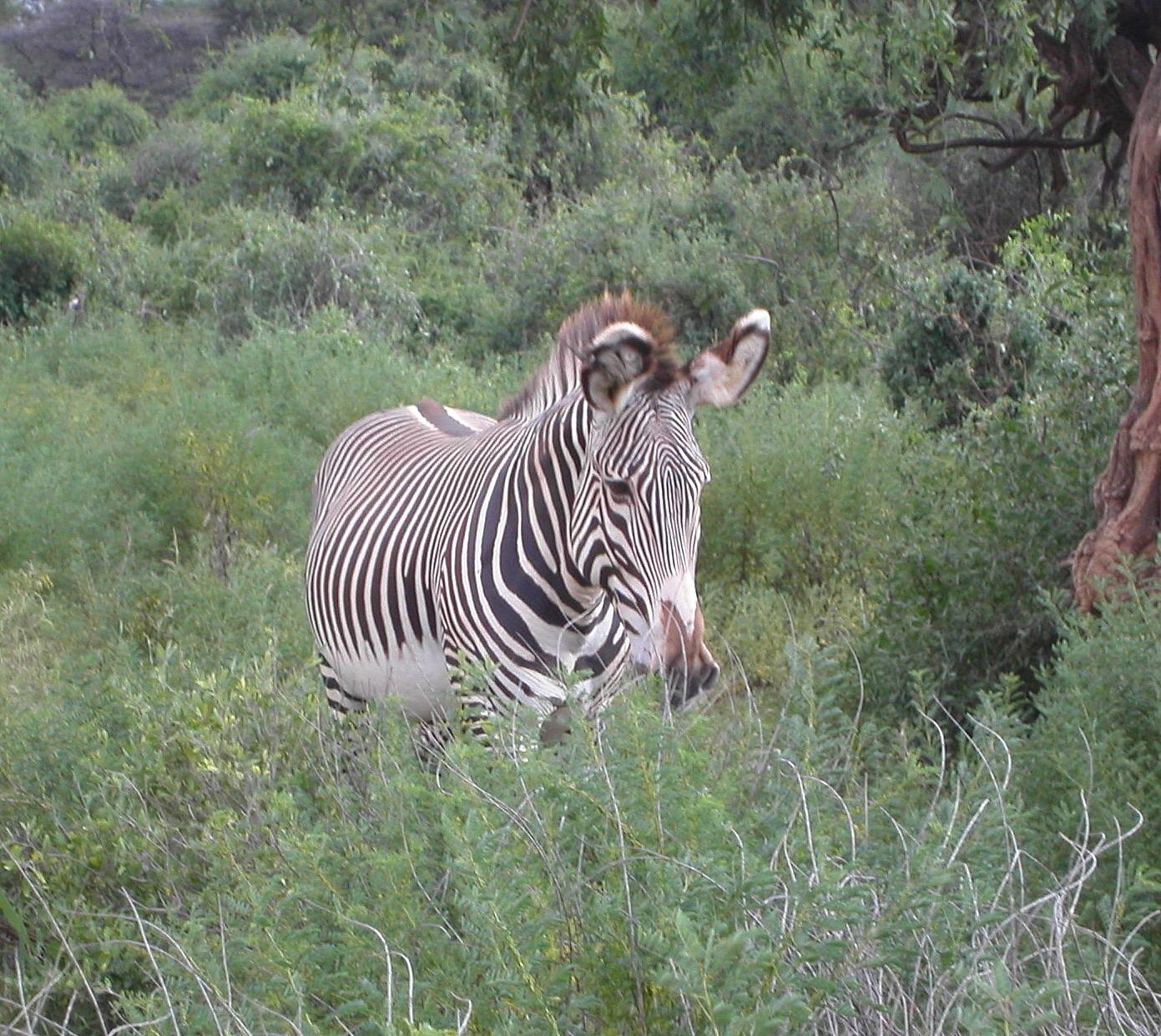
Zebra in dense brush

Grévy's zebra largely inhabits northern Kenya, with some isolated populations in Ethiopia. It was extirpated from Somalia and Djibouti and its status in South Sudan is uncertain. It lives in Acacia-Commiphora bushlands and barren plains. Ecologically, this species is intermediate between the arid-living African wild ass and the water-dependent plains zebra. Lactating mares and non-territorial stallions use areas with green, short grass and medium, dense bush more often than non-lactating mares and territorial stallions.

Grévy's zebras rely on grasses, forbs (such as legumes), and browse for nutrition. They commonly browse when grasses are not plentiful. Their hindgut fermentation digestive system allows them to subsist on diets of lower nutritional quality than that necessary for ruminant herbivores. Grevy's zebras can survive up to a week without water, but will drink daily when it is plentiful. They often migrate to better watered highlands during the dry season. Mares require significantly more water when they are lactating. During droughts, the zebras will dig water holes and defend them.

The main predators of Grévy's zebras are lions, but spotted hyenas also hunt them. African hunting dogs, cheetahs, and leopards almost never attack adults, even in desperate times, but they sometimes prey on young animals, although mares are fiercely protective of their young. In addition, Grévy's zebra is susceptible to various gastro-intestinal parasites, notably of the genus Trichostrongylus.

== Behaviour and life history ==
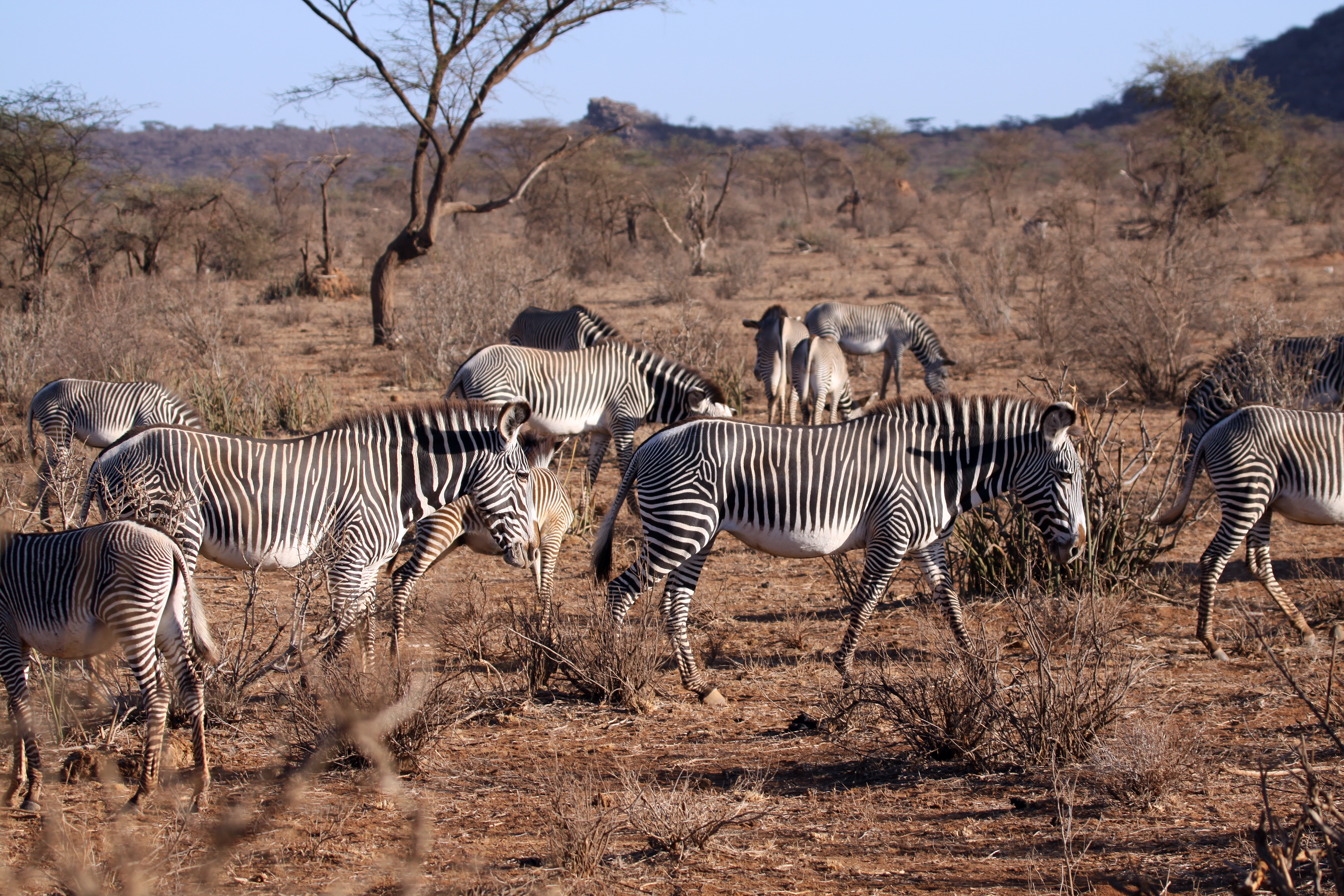
Herd of Grévy's zebras

Adult stallions mostly live in territories during the wet seasons but some may stay in them year round if there's enough water left. Stallions that are unable to establish territories are free-ranging and are known as bachelors. Mares, young and non-territorial stallions wander through large home ranges. The mares will wander from territory to territory preferring the ones with the highest-quality food and water sources. Up to nine stallions may compete for a mare outside of a territory. Territorial stallions will tolerate other stallions who wander in their territory. However, when an oestrous mare is present the territorial stallion keeps other stallions at bay. Non-territorial stallions might avoid territorial ones because of harassment. When mares are not around, a territorial stallion will seek the company of other stallions. The stallion shows his dominance with an arched neck and a high-stepping gait and the least dominant stallions submit by extending their tail, lowering their heads and nuzzling their superior's chest or groin.

Zebras produce numerous sounds and vocalisations. When alarmed, they produce deep, hoarse grunts. Whistles and squeals are also made when alarmed, during fights, when scared or in pain. Snorts may be produced when scared or as a warning. A stallion will bray in defense of his territory, when driving mares, or keeping other stallions at bay. Barks may be made during copulation and distressed foals will squeal. The call of the Grévy's zebra has been described as "something like a hippo's grunt combined with a donkey's wheeze". To get rid of flies or parasites, they roll in dust, water or mud or, in the case of flies, they twitch their skin. They also rub against trees, rocks and other objects to get rid of irritations such as itchy skin, hair or parasites. Although Grévy's zebras do not perform mutual grooming, they do sometimes rub against a conspecific.

Grévy's zebra braying
The braying sound of Grévy's zebra has a hippo's grunt combined with a donkey's wheeze. At Lincoln Park Zoo, Chicago, Illinois.

=== Reproduction ===
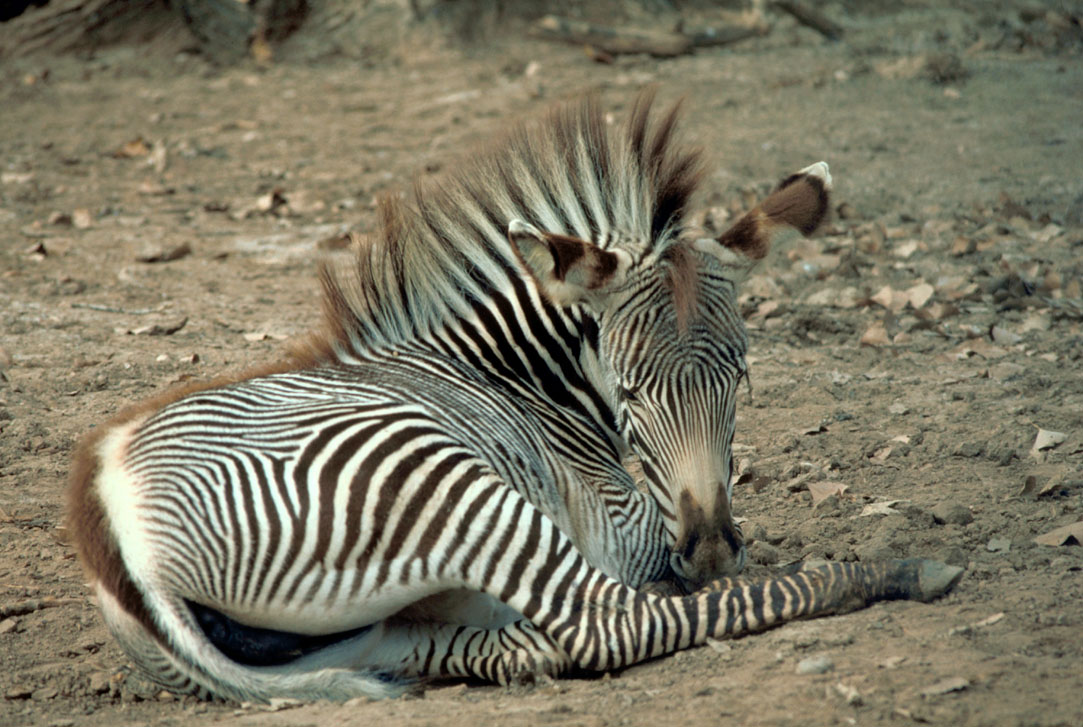
Zebra foal resting

Grévy's zebras can mate and give birth year round, but most mating takes place in the early rainy seasons and births mostly take place in August or September after the long rains. An oestrous mare may visit as many as four territories a day and will mate with the stallions in them. Among territorial stallions, the most dominant ones control territories near water sources, which mostly attract mares with dependant foals, while more subordinate stallions control territories away from water with greater amounts of vegetation, which mostly attract mares without dependant foals.

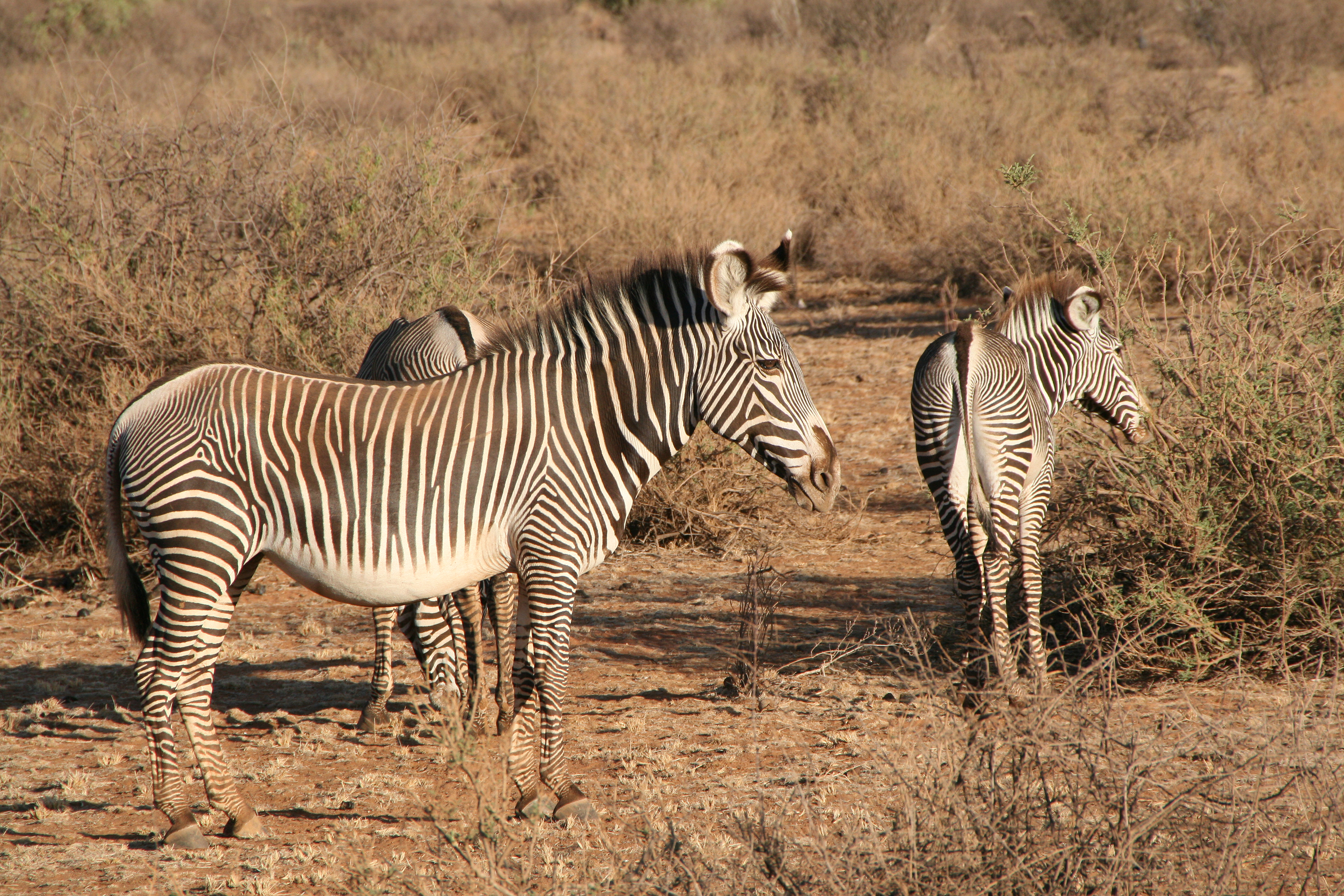
Zebra mare near younger zebras

The resident stallions of territories will try to subdue the entering mares with dominance rituals and then continue with courtship and copulation. Grévy's zebra stallions have large testicles and can ejaculate a large amount of semen to replace the sperm of other males. This is a useful adaptation for a species whose mares mate polyandrously. Bachelors or outside territorial stallions sometimes "sneak" copulation of mares in another stallion's territory. While mare associations with individual stallions are brief and mating is promiscuous, mares who have just given birth will reside within a territory protected by a territorial stallion. Lactating mares have higher water requirements than non-lactating mares, and stallions typically control areas near water. Lactating females are harassed by stallions more often than non-lactating ones and thus associating with one male and his territory provides an advantage as he will guard against other males.

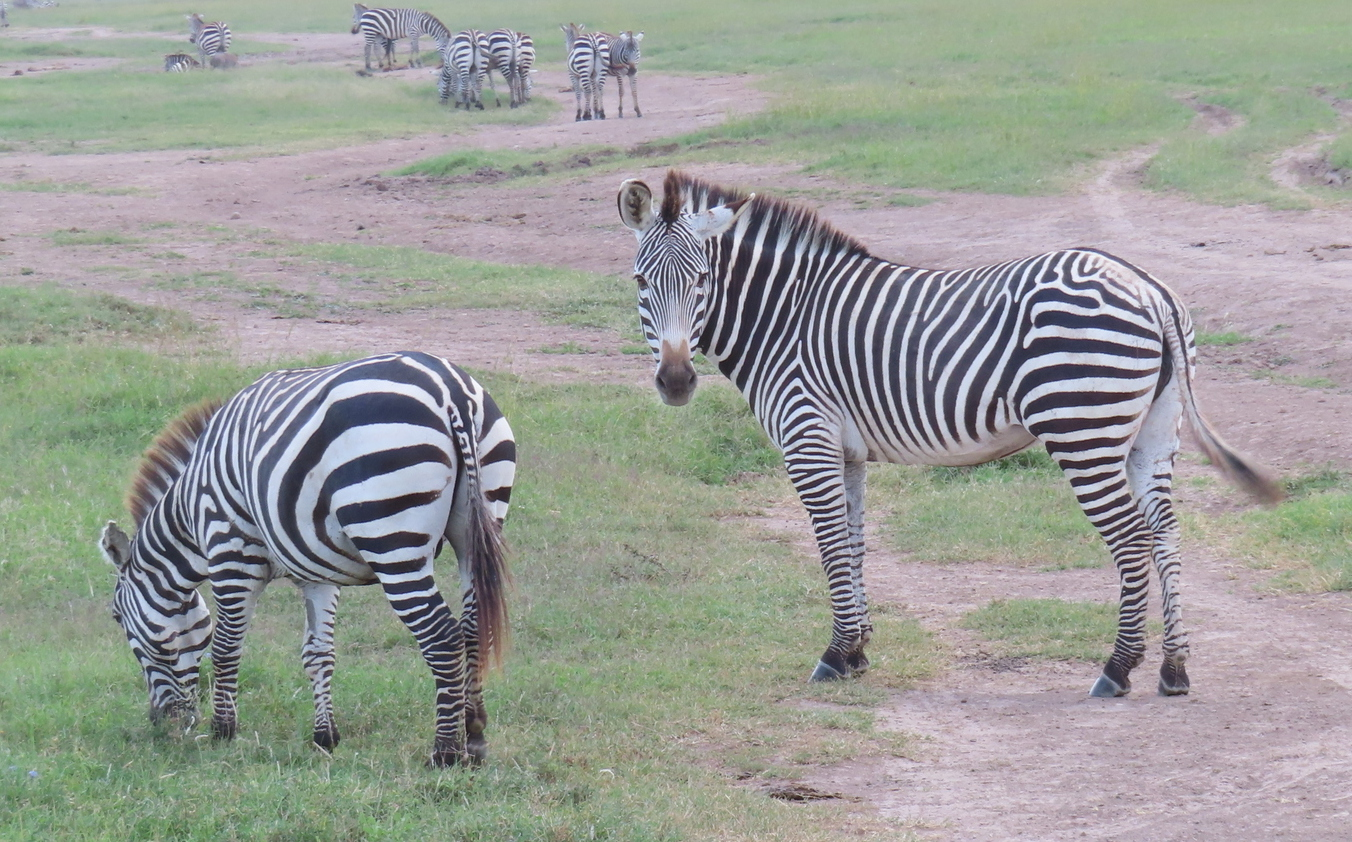
Grévy's × plains zebra hybrid, alongside plains zebras

Gestation of the Grévy's zebra normally lasts 390 days (13 months), with a single foal being born. A newborn zebra will follow anything that moves, so new mothers prevent other mares from approaching their foals while imprinting their own striping pattern, scent and vocalisation on them. Mares with young foals may gather into small groups. Mares may leave their foals in "kindergartens" in a stallion's territory while searching for water when grazing conditions are poor. The foals will not hide, so they can be vulnerable to predators. While the foal may not be his, the stallion will tolerate it to ensure that the mare stays in his territory. To adapt to a semi-arid environment, Grévy's zebra foals have longer nursing intervals and wait until they are three months old before they start drinking water. Although offspring become less dependent on their mothers after half a year, associations with them continue for up to three years.

== Relationship with humans ==
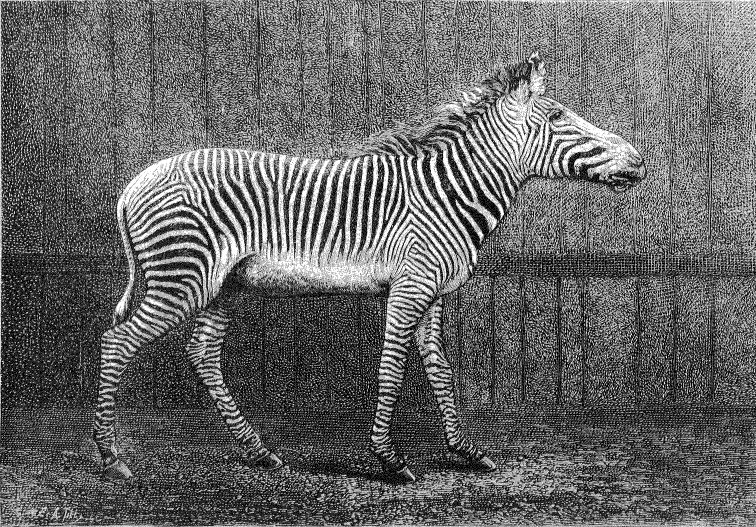
An engraving of the zebra given to Jules Grévy and kept at the Ménagerie du Jardin des Plantes in 1882

The Grévy's zebra was known to the Europeans in antiquity and was used by the Romans in circuses. It was subsequently forgotten in the Western world for a thousand years. In the seventeenth century, the king of Shoa (now central Ethiopia) exported two zebras; one to the Sultan of Turkey and another to the Dutch governor of Jakarta. A century later, in 1882, Menelik II as emperor of Ethiopia sent one to France as a gift to president Jules Grévy. It was at that time that the animal was recognised as its own species, and French zoologist Émile Oustalet named it in Grévy's honour. Grévy's zebra appears on the Eritrean 25-cent coin.

At least one specimen of the rare animal was imported into Rye, New York in the United States by Warner M. van Norden and his wife Grace Talcott as part of an endeavor to hybridize the animal with horses to create a superior farm animal. A special "zebra house" was built for the red-striped animal and other zebras complete with steam heating. Four of the specimens are said to have been kept on the Jay Estate for a number of years.

=== Status and conservation ===
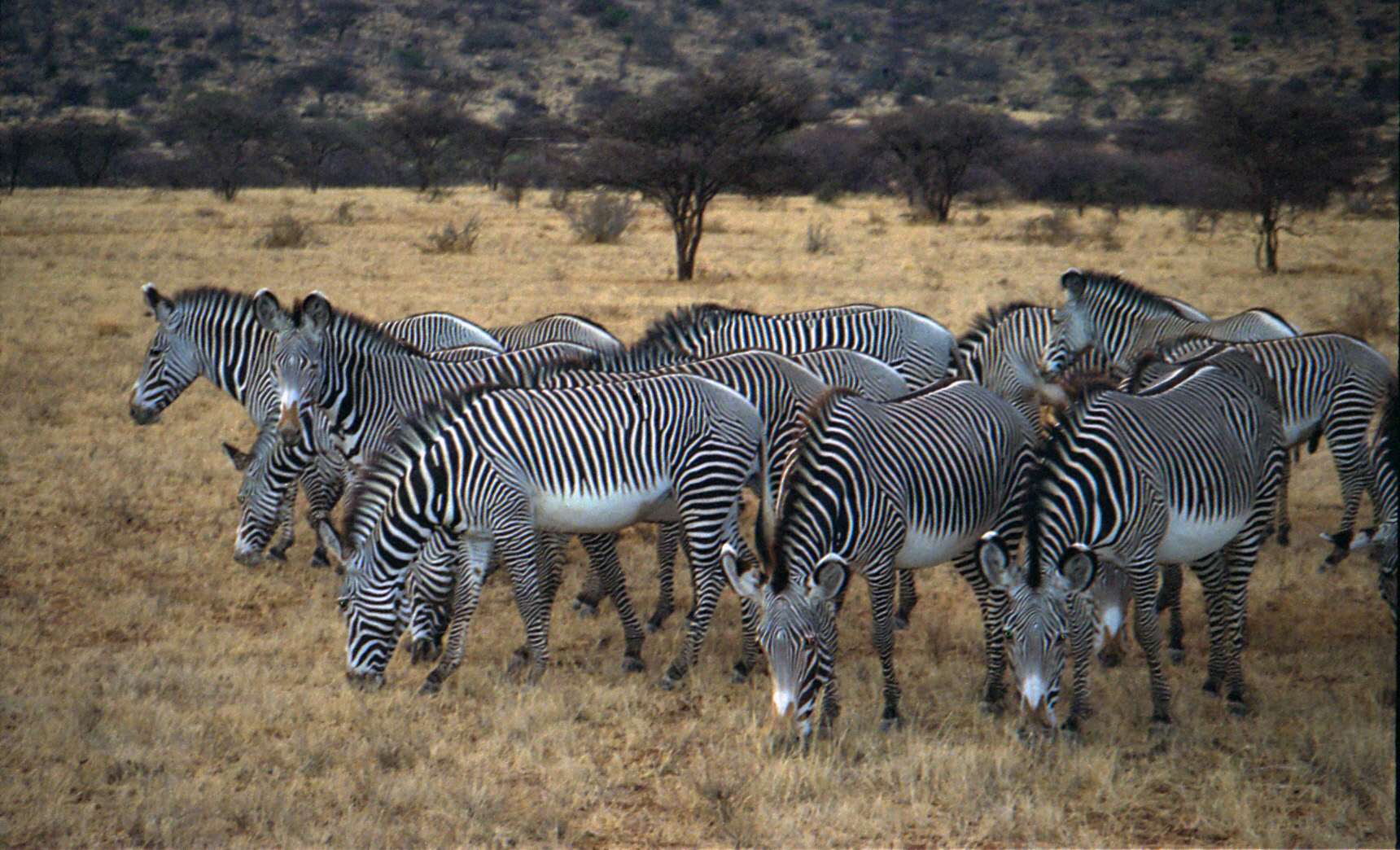
Grevy's zebras in Samburu National Reserve

The Grévy's zebra is considered endangered. Its population was estimated to be 15,000 in the 1970s and by the early 21st century the population was lower than 3,500, a 75% decline. In 2008, it was estimated that there are less than 2,500 Grévy's zebras still living in the wild, further declining to fewer than 2,000 mature individuals in 2016. Nonetheless, the Grévy's zebra population trend was considered stable as of 2016.

There are also an estimated 600 Grévy's zebras in captivity. Captive herds have been known to thrive, like at White Oak Conservation in Yulee, Florida, United States, where more than 70 foals have been born. There, research is underway in partnership with the Conservation Centers for Species Survival on semen collection and freezing and on artificial insemination.

The Grévy's zebra is legally protected in Ethiopia. In Kenya, it is protected by the hunting ban of 1977. In the past, Grévy's zebras were threatened mainly by hunting for their skins which fetched a high price on the world market. However, hunting has declined and the main threat to the zebra is habitat loss and competition with livestock. Cattle gather around watering holes and the Grévy's zebras are fenced from those areas. Community-based conservation efforts have shown to be the most effective in preserving Grévy's zebras and their habitat. Less than 0.5% of the range of the Grévy's zebra is in protected areas. In Ethiopia, the protected areas include Aledeghi Wildlife Reserve, Yabelo Wildlife Sanctuary, Borana National Park, and Chelbi Sanctuary. In Kenya, important protected areas include the Buffalo Springs, Samburu and Shaba National Reserves and the private and community land wildlife conservancies in Isiolo, Samburu and the Laikipia Plateau.

The mesquite plant was introduced into Ethiopia around 1997 and is endangering the zebra's food supply. An invasive species, it is replacing the two grass species, Cenchrus ciliaris and Chrysopogon plumulosus, which the zebras eat for most of their food.
