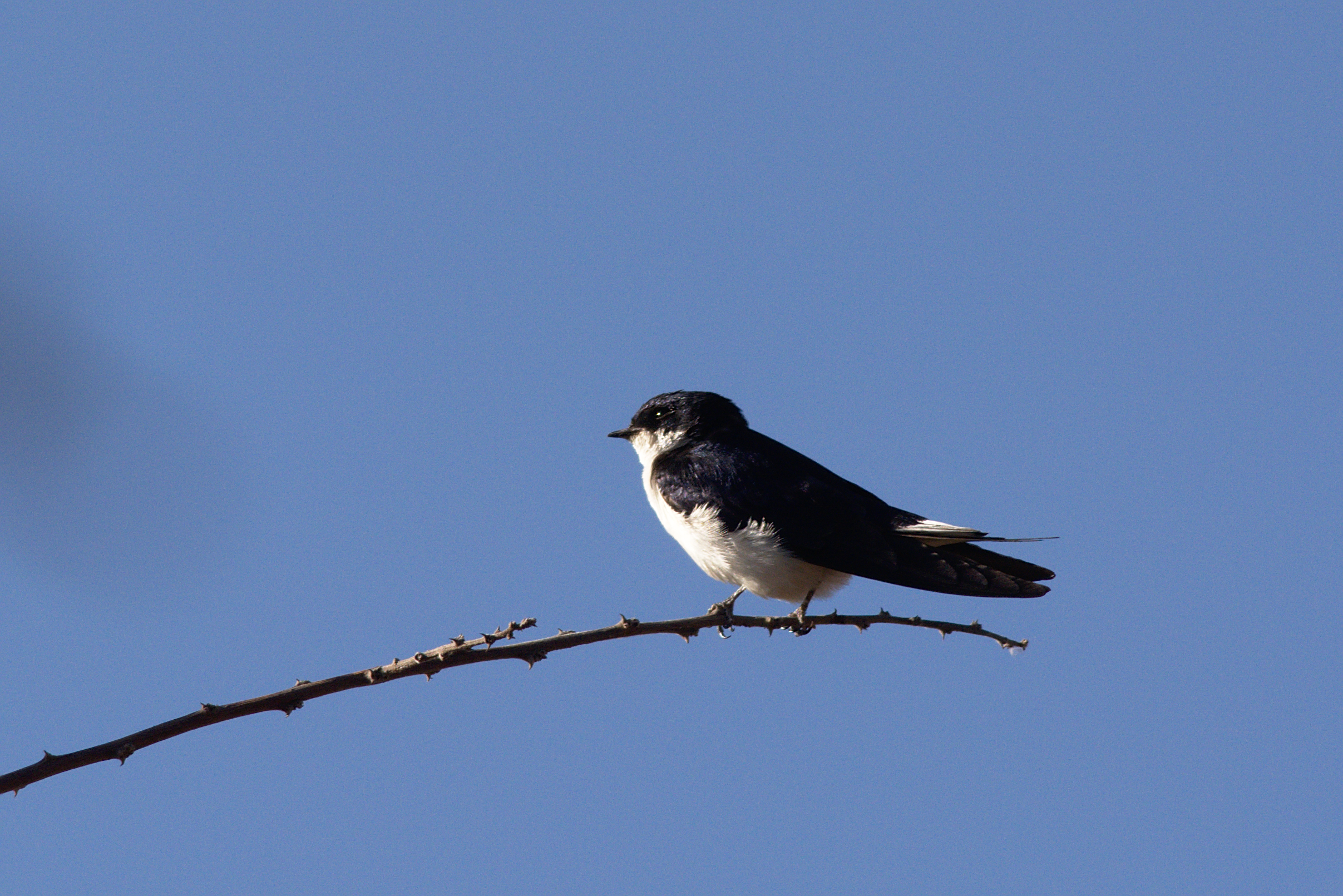
- At Mega, Ethiopia

Conservation status
- Vulnerable (IUCN 3.1)

Scientific classification
- Kingdom: Animalia
- Phylum: Chordata
- Class: Aves
- Order: Passeriformes
- Family: Hirundinidae
- Genus: Hirundo
- Species: H. megaensis

Binomial name
- Hirundo megaensis Benson, 1942
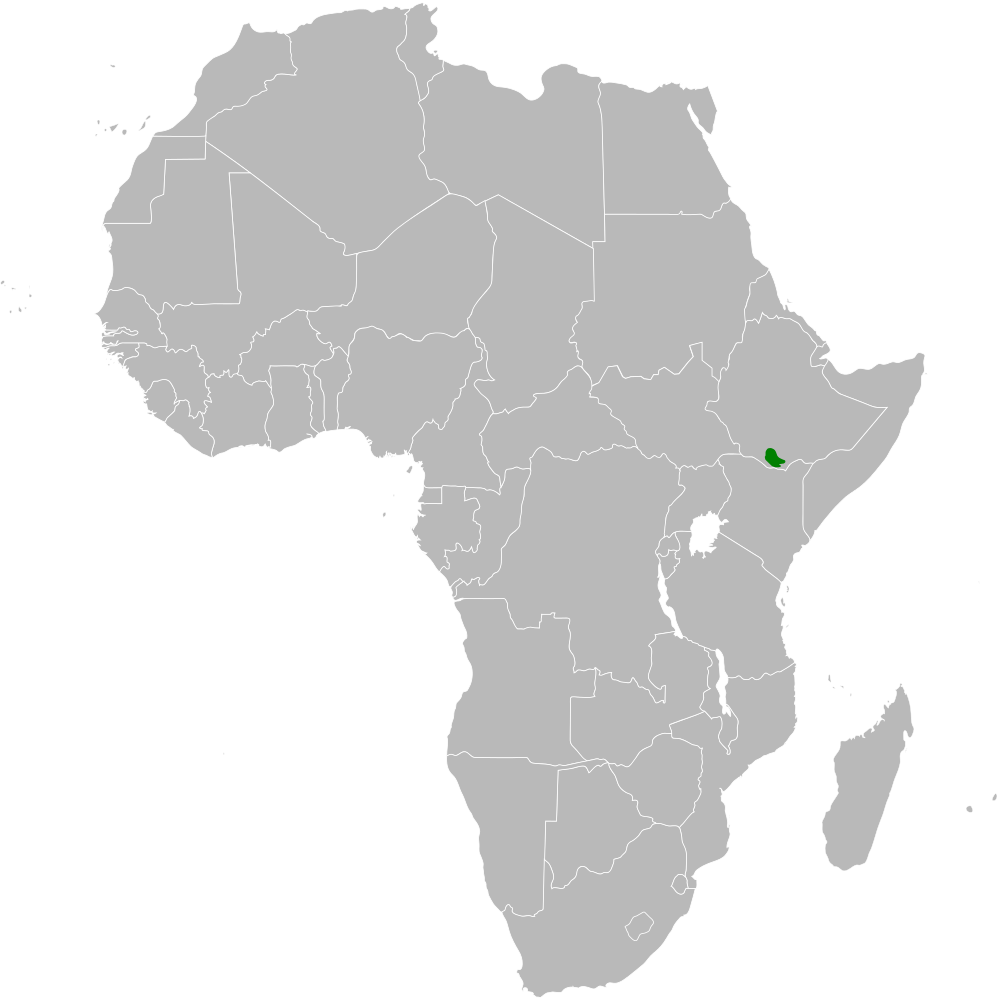

= White-tailed swallow =

Species of bird

The white-tailed swallow (Hirundo megaensis) is a small swallow belonging to the family Hirundinidae and is endemic to Oromia, Ethiopia. It is commonly referred to as "Benson's swallow" after the ornithologist Constantine Walter Benson, who described the species. This small bird is classified as a vulnerable species by the International Union for Conservation of Nature (IUCN), as there is a progressive declination of the species which now consists of less than 10,000 adult individuals worldwide. It has a surprisingly small range for a swallow, as it is wholly dependent on a cooler "bubble" surrounding its small range, likely for proper breeding success. It is one of the most threatened bird species by climate change and a massive range reduction is projected in the future.

== Description ==
The white-tailed swallow is a small bird that measures about 13 cm (5.1 in) in length. It is named for its distinct white underbelly which runs from the throat to the tail. The top of the bird's body, including its head, wings, and back, is mostly blue. The tail is slightly forked. It consists of short, white feathers and long, darker feathers on the edges, called rectrices, that are used for greater balance and steering while in flight. The white-tailed swallow is a sexually dimorphic bird; coloration and tail length differ between male and female. Male white-tailed swallows have brighter blue and white plumage than females. Females are often described as having duller coats with less vibrant coloration. Females tend to have more blue-grey plumage while males have blue-black. Both adult male and female birds have "glossy" coats, although the brightness varies. The overall size of the bird depends on its sex. Female white-tailed swallows are slightly smaller with shorter tails than the male.

The young white-tailed swallow has more brown plumage than the adult. It has a dull coat and is not as glossy as the adult white-tailed swallow. In addition to being relatively smaller than the adult white-tailed swallow, it is similar in appearance to the adult female white-tailed swallow in terms of size, tail length, and coloration.

== Habitat and distribution ==
=== Habitat ===
The natural habitat of the white-tailed swallow is subtropical or tropical high-altitude shrubland It is endemic to southern Ethiopia and particularly restricted to the Yabelo–Mega region of Oromia. It is found between altitudes of 4,000–4,500 ft (1,220–1,370 m); however, it is not prevalent in altitudes lower than 4,000 ft (1,220 m). The white-tailed swallow is most commonly found in both savanna and grassland pastures of high elevation. The white-tailed swallow often settles near to human civilization.

=== Population ===
The white-tailed swallow is endemic to Ethiopia, meaning it is not found anywhere else in the world. The small bird is labelled as a vulnerable species according to the IUCN. There are approximately 3,500-15,000 white-tailed swallows remaining in the world and the number of adult individuals is even less at 2,500-9,999. The population of the white-tailed swallow is continuously decreasing due to both natural and human causes. The population has experienced a declining trend since 1988 and has been classified as vulnerable since 1994.

=== Threats ===
==== Habitat loss ====
A major threat to the white-tailed swallow is habitat loss. It experiences a natural habitat loss known as woody plant encroachment. Woody encroachment is the overgrowth of "unpalatable thorny shrubs" that dominates other plants and is caused by several factors, specifically fire suppression and overgrazing. Fire suppression in the Yabelo Wildlife Sanctuary is a factor in the overgrowth of shrubbery where the white-tailed swallow cannot live or breed comfortably. Overgrazing is caused by humans through poor rotation of crops or by allowing farm animals to overfeed on the pastures. Both fire suppression and overgrazing lead to woody encroachment which further hinders the white-tailed swallow's habitat range.

The white-tailed swallow also experiences habitat loss due to humans. Human factors contributing to habitat loss include an increase in human population, overgrazing, and increased cultivation in the area. With an increase of human population in southern Ethiopia comes the expansion of traditional huts into the habitat of the white-tailed swallow which takes away from their natural habitat and modifies it. As mentioned before, overgrazing is a threat to habitat loss of the white-tailed swallow because it can result in woody plant encroachment. Furthermore, an increase in cultivation can lead to habitat degradation by turning fields and forests into farmland.

==== Climate change ====
Due to its extremely unusual and specific temperature requirements for breeding, the white-tailed sparrow (along with the sympatric Stresemann's bushcrow, Zavattariornis stresemanni) is considered one of the most threatened birds by climate change; it could lose up to 68% of its range in even the best-case climate scenarios, and as high as 84% in the worst-case scenarios. Occupied range can often overestimate the number of individuals occupying the range, so the estimated population reduction may be even more than the percentage of habitat loss. Both species may be the only examples of warm-blooded animals whose range is fully driven by the climate. The birds and their projected decline may be used as indicator species for climate change, allowing them to test the reliability of habitat models for other threatened animals. Both may also serve as flagship species for the impacts of climate change on avian diversity in Africa.

=== Conservation ===
The Yabelo wildlife sanctuary, located in southern Ethiopia, is a protected area in which the white-tailed swallow can be found. This area is sheltered against destruction of the ecosystem; however, there is previously noted fire suppression in the area which contributes to bush encroachment.

Additionally, traditional huts in the Yabelo-Mega region influence the prevalence of the white-tailed swallow and their ability to build nests. Since the white-tailed swallow commonly builds nests in and on the local huts, they are essential to conserving the species and providing suitable nesting locations.

== Behaviour and ecology ==
=== Nesting ===
The white-tailed swallow tends to builds its nests in traditional Borana huts and termite mounds. Village huts provide protection against weather. The small bird tends to build nests on the huts' roof beams and door frames where there is support for the nest. The white-tailed swallow does not seem affected by the presence of humans and will build their nests inside occupied huts. White-tailed swallow nests have also been spotted in termite mounds, although it is not as common. Termite mounds are harder to detect and difficult to determine whether nests have been built inside.

The physical nest of the white-tailed swallow resembles a small bowl or cup. They are typically constructed of mud, grass, and animal hair. The nests are observed to be around 60-160mm deep.

=== Reproduction and breeding habits ===
There are two breeding seasons for the white-tailed swallow. The first is from April to June and the following is from October to November. Both breeding terms occur during the rain seasons in southern Ethiopia. The white-tailed swallow typically lays 3-4 white eggs for each breeding season. The incubation phase is claimed to last between 2–3 weeks.
