= Kapedo =

- Location within Kenya
- Coordinates: 1.17°N 36.1°E
- Country: Kenya
- County: Turkana County
- Time zone: UTC+3 (EAT)
- Climate: BSh

Kapedo is a trading center in the Turkana East sub-county of Turkana County, in Kenya's former Rift Valley Province. It is a 5-hour drive from Nakuru town.

Administratively, it is headed by a chief (National Government), to be assisted by a village administrator (recruited by the County Government of Turkana).

The village lies to the West of Mount Silale on the floor of the Great Rift Valley at the head of the Suguta Valley.

The Suguta River emanates from hot springs just east of the village, and is joined by the Suguta River flowing from the West and drains to the North.

The village, occupied by Turkana people, is in a hot semi-desert area. Most houses are semi-permanent, made of iron sheets on the roof and mud on the walls. There are also houses made of mud and palm leaves. However, due to the prospective LAPPSET, the village has a number of permanent houses.

Kapedo is a trading center with a few shops selling basic goods such as flour, tea, sugar and kerosene.

There is very little agricultural land, so the people mainly depend on raising goats, and sheep. Conflicts create risk in herding.

The village is home to four learning institutions: Kapedo Mixed Boarding Primary School, Kapedo Girls Primary School, Lomelo Primary and the Kapedo Mixed Secondary School, which was built by the late former MP Francis Ewoton Achuka in 2002 and has a staff of eight, mostly BOM teachers over 180 pupils. The capacity of the school is much higher but few students can afford even the modest fees.

As of 2011, the Kapedo Sub-County Hospital had 28 beds and four cots. It provided in-patient and out-patient services related to maternity, HIV and tuberculosis. Insecurity from the neighboring Pokot has rendered the facility an in-patient only and emergency cases are referred to Nakuru or Eldoret.

Kapedo has high potential but it is limited mostly due to the defunct hydro-electric power plant that has been desolate for years since the departure of the Finnish missionaries. The 'mission' coined for the Kapedo Mixed Primary School, Hospital, Full Gospel Church, the garage and the guest house were heavily hit after the redundancy of the HEP project.

Due to insecurity from the neighboring Pokot community from Tiaty sub-county in Baringo county, and being a border village, Kapedo is a host to a platoon of the General Service Unit and an Administration Police camp.
