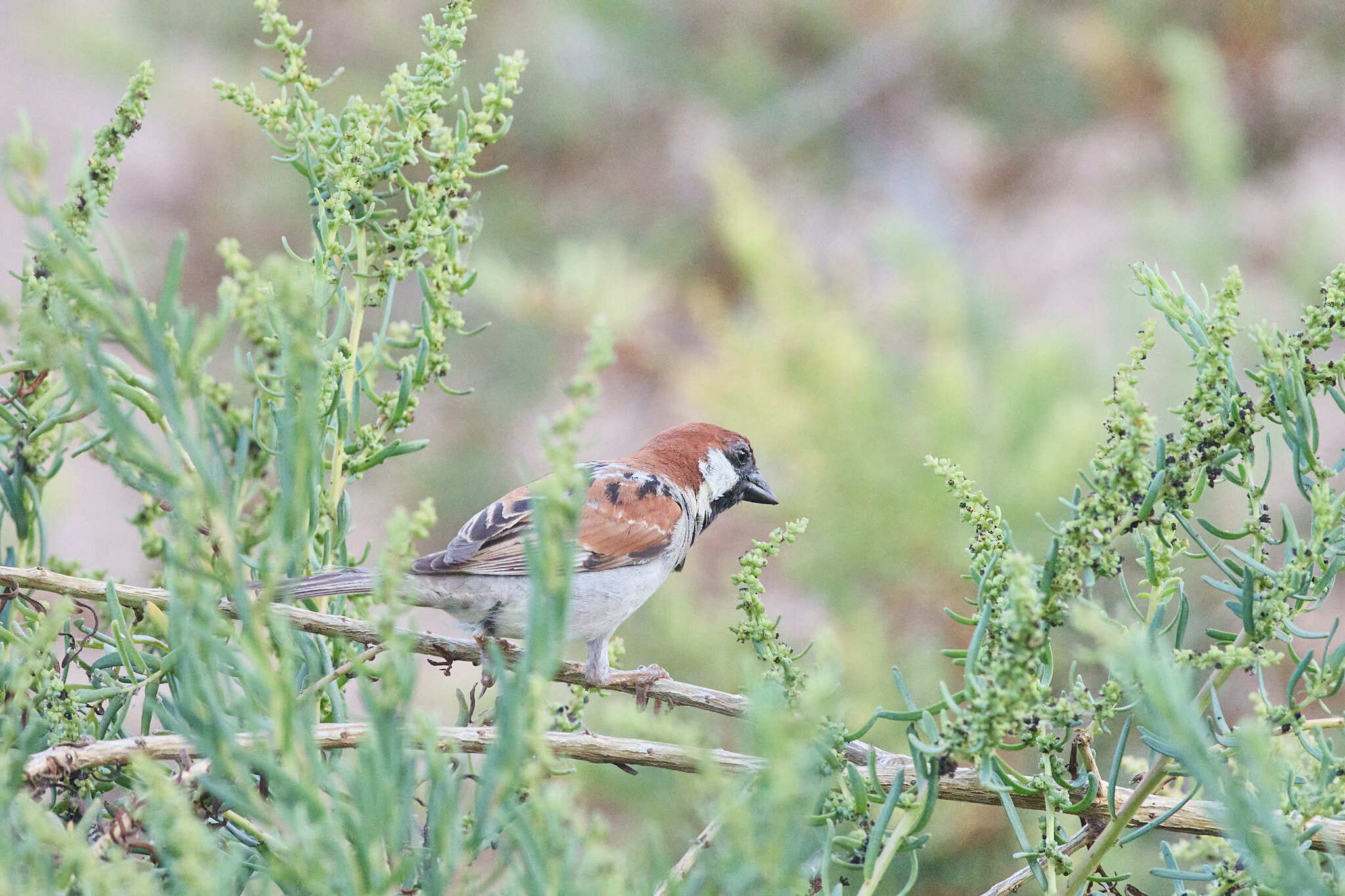

Conservation status
- Least Concern (IUCN 3.1)

Scientific classification
- Kingdom: Animalia
- Phylum: Chordata
- Class: Aves
- Order: Passeriformes
- Family: Passeridae
- Genus: Passer
- Species: P. castanopterus

Binomial name
- Passer castanopterus Blyth, 1855

= Somali sparrow =

Species of bird

The Somali sparrow (Passer castanopterus) is a species of bird in the family Passeridae found in Somalia, Djibouti, Ethiopia and Kenya.

It is considered a superspecies with the russet sparrow (Passer rutilans) and sometimes is even treated as the same species. However, the similarities in plumage and morphology between the two seem to represent convergent evolution rather than a single lineage.

Two subspecies are recognized:

- Passer castanopterus castanopterus Blyth, 1855 – Djibouti, Somaliland, and eastern Ethiopia
- Passer castanopterus fulgens Friedmann, 1931 – southern Ethiopia, and northern Kenya (south to Kapedo and Marsabit).

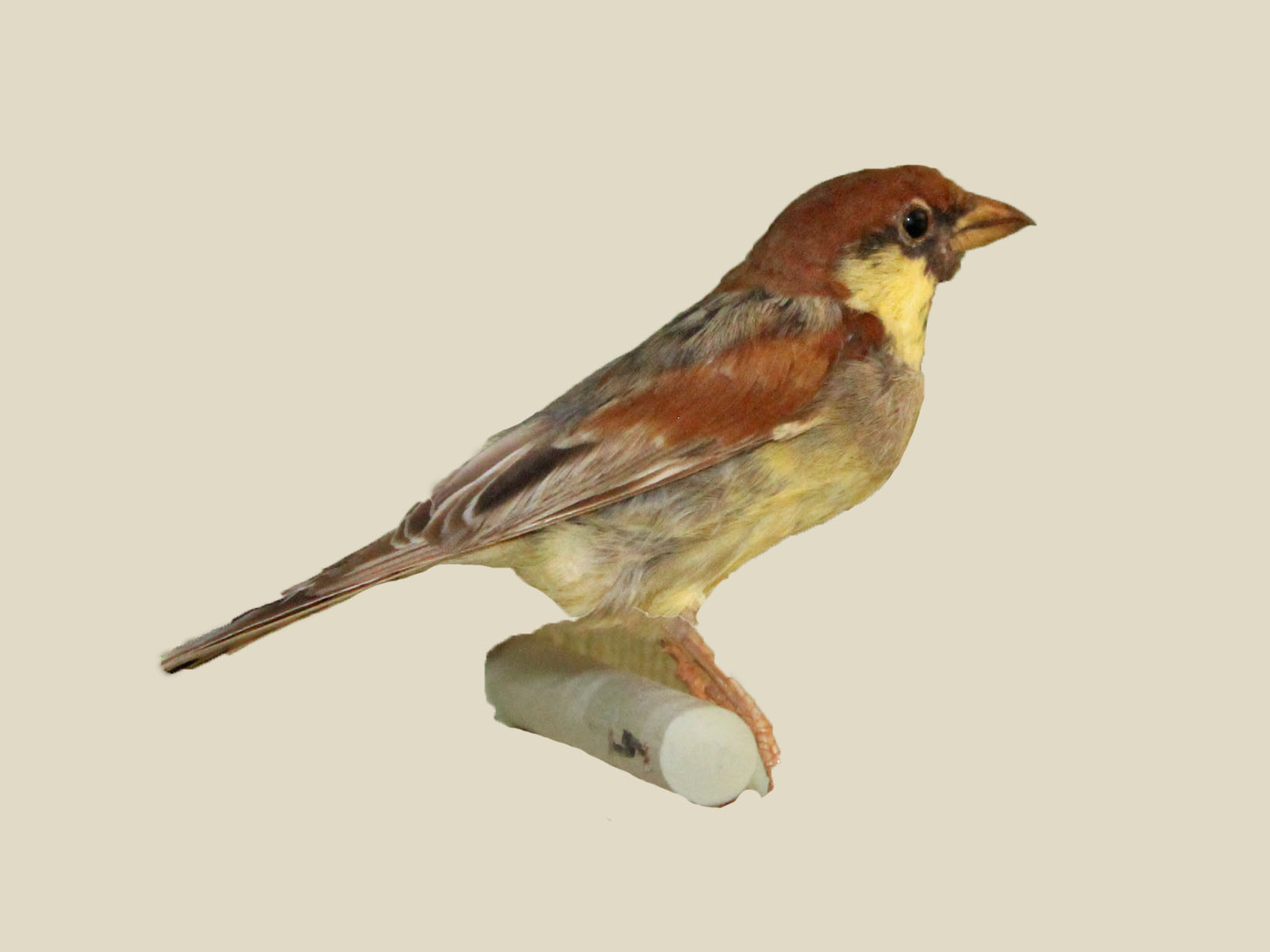
Specimen at Nairobi National Museum in Kenya
