= Giacinto Martorelli =

Italian ornithologist

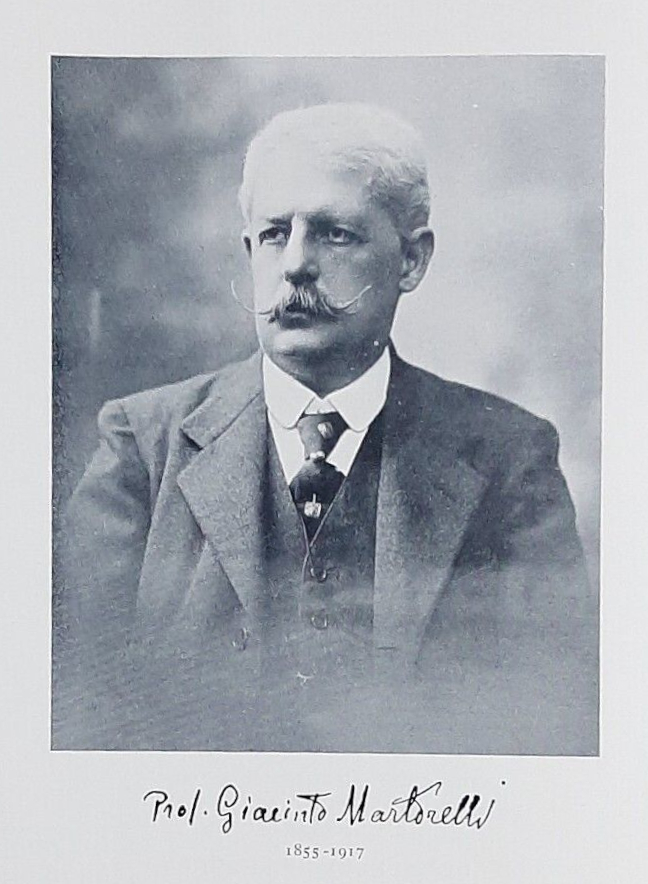

Giacinto Martorelli (1 October 1855 – 11 December 1917) was an Italian ornithologist and bird artist best known for the book Gli uccelli d'Italia (1905–06). He took a special interest in bird hybridization.

Martorelli was born in Turin to Francesco and Luigi. After graduating from Turin in 1879, he joined the museum of zoology under Tommaso Salvadori at the university as an assistant to Michele Lessona. He worked as a high school teacher at Sassari from 1881 to 1883 during which time he also made observations on birds and collected specimens. He moved to Pistoia in 1883 and worked with E. H. Giglioli from 1884, illustrating some of his books. Martorelli returned to work at Turin and then moved to Rome to teach at the Mamiani high school followed by work in Beccaria high school in Milan where he settled. At Milan he worked with the Museum of Natural History and took charge of the Turati collection in 1893. He was one of the founders of the journal Rivista italiana di ornitologia in 1911 and was one of the editors of the journal until his death. Although interested in hunting, he became more concerned about bird protection in his later years.
