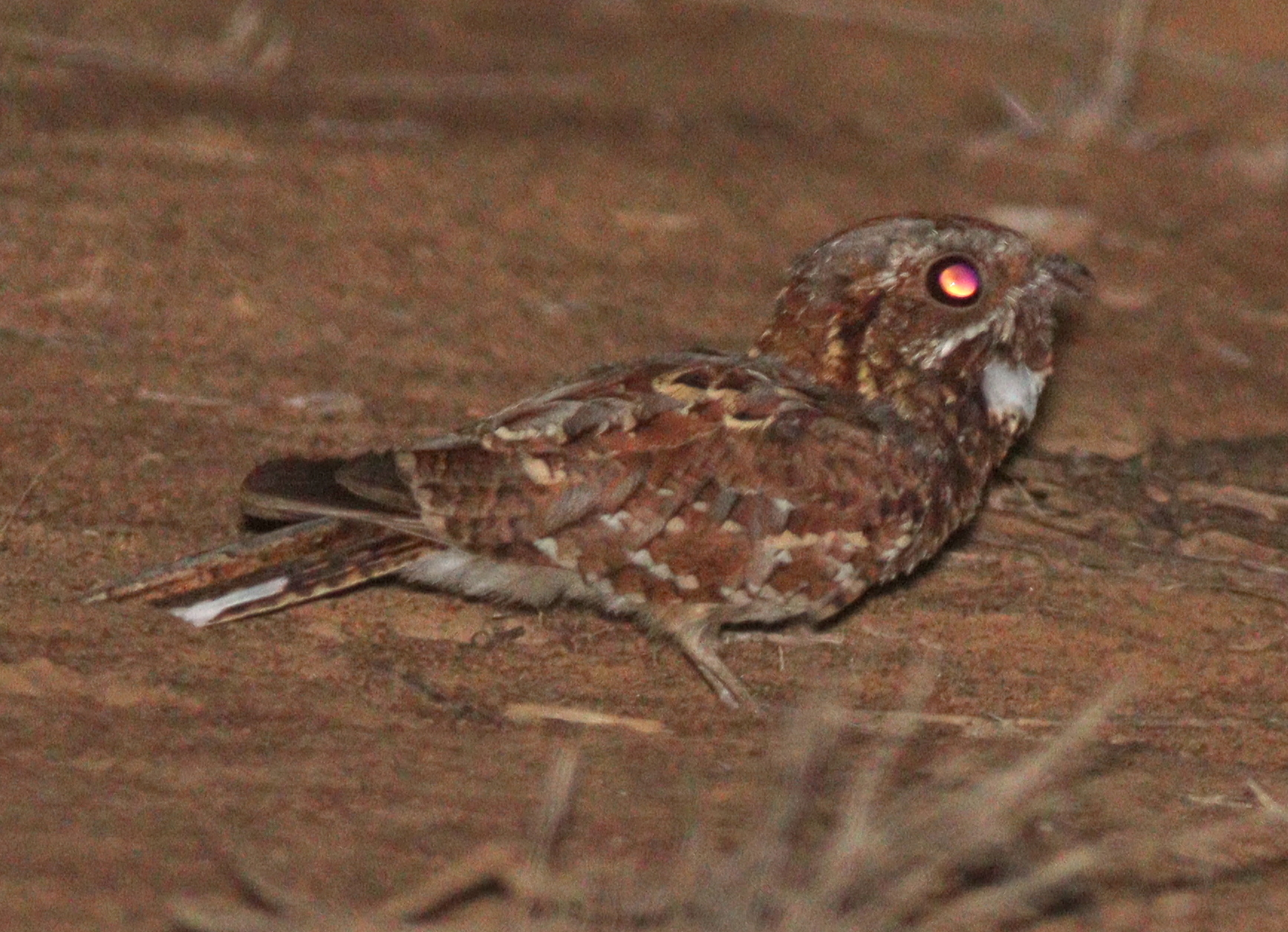

Conservation status
- Least Concern (IUCN 3.1)

Scientific classification
- Kingdom: Animalia
- Phylum: Chordata
- Class: Aves
- Order: Caprimulgiformes
- Family: Caprimulgidae
- Genus: Caprimulgus
- Species: C. donaldsoni

Binomial name
- Caprimulgus donaldsoni Sharpe, 1895

= Donaldson Smith's nightjar =

Species of bird

Donaldson Smith's nightjar (Caprimulgus donaldsoni) is a species of nightjar in the family Caprimulgidae. It is found in Ethiopia, Kenya, Somalia, and Tanzania. It was named in honor of the 19th-century American explorer Arthur Donaldson Smith.
