= East African montane forests =

Ecoregion in Africa

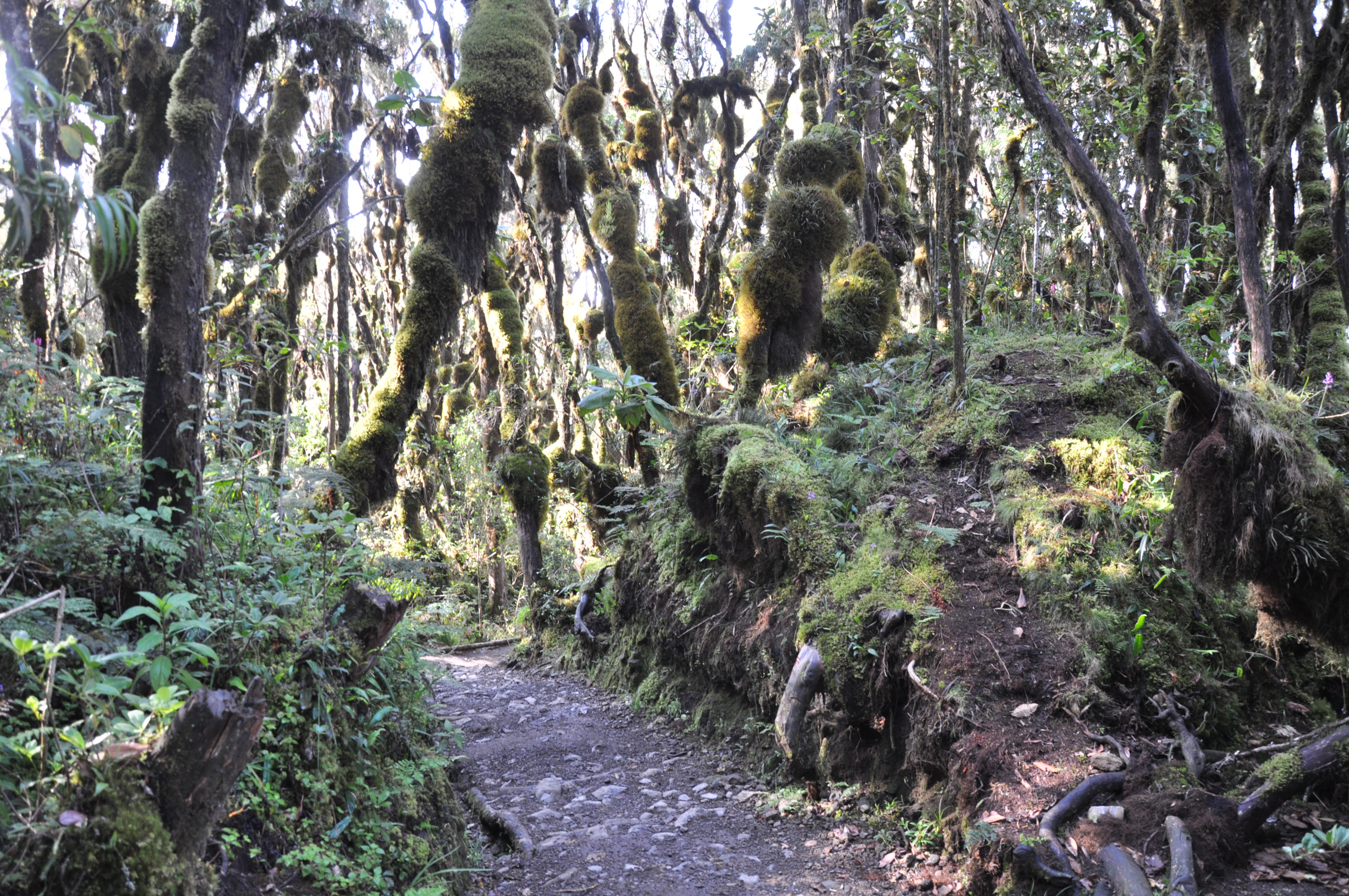
- Montane rainforest on Mount Kilimanjaro

- East African montane forests (in purple)

Ecology
- Realm: Afrotropical
- Biome: tropical and subtropical moist broadleaf forests
- Borders: List: East African montane moorlands; East Sudanian savanna; Northern Acacia–Commiphora bushlands and thickets; Serengeti volcanic grasslands; Southern Acacia–Commiphora bushlands and thickets; Victoria Basin forest–savanna mosaic

Geography
- Area: 65,500 km^{2} (25,300 sq mi)
- Countries: Kenya; South Sudan; Tanzania; Uganda
- Coordinates: .55°S 35.65°E

Conservation
- Conservation status: critical/endangered
- Protected: 35%

The East African montane forests is a montane tropical moist forest ecoregion of eastern Africa. The ecoregion comprises several separate areas above 2000 meters in the mountains of South Sudan, Uganda, Kenya, and Tanzania.

== Geography ==
The East African montane forests extend across a total of 65,500 square kilometers (25,300 sq mi), in 25 separate enclaves, which range in size from 23,700 to 113 square kilometers. The montane forests extend down to approximately 1000 meters elevation, and as high as 3500 meters. The northernmost enclave is on Mount Kinyeti in the Imatong Mountains of South Sudan, extending south through Mount Moroto in eastern Uganda and Mount Elgon on the Kenya-Uganda border. In Kenya and Tanzania, the ecoregion follows the mountains east and west of the Eastern Rift and associated volcanoes, including the Aberdare Range, Mount Kenya, Mount Kulal, Mount Nyiru, Ndoto Mountains, Matthews Range, Mount Marsabit, Cherangany Hills, and the Nguruman Escarpment in Kenya, and Mount Kilimanjaro, Mount Meru, Ngorongoro, and the Marang forests (Mbulu Highlands and Mount Hanang) in northern Tanzania.

== Climate ==
The climate of the ecoregion is more temperate and seasonal than the surrounding lowlands. Temperatures can fall below 10 °C (50 °F) in the coldest months (July and August) and rise above 30 °C (86 °F) in the warm season. Temperatures are generally lower at higher elevations, and frosts can occur at the highest elevations.

Average annual rainfall varies between 1,200 and 2,000 mm, with two wet seasons – October to December and March to June – and two dry seasons – January and February and July to October. The climate is more humid than the surrounding lowlands, and with less distinct wet and dry seasons. Rainfall varies from mountain to mountain, with elevation, and with the direction of prevailing winds.

== Flora ==
The ecoregion consists of montane forests, grasslands, and savannas, transitioning to the East African montane moorlands on the highest peaks. The ecoregion is home to the Afromontane flora, which occurs in the mountains of eastern Africa, and is distinct from the lowland flora.

Plant communities vary with elevation. Plant communities and characteristic species are generally similar from mountain to mountain. The elevational limits for plant communities can vary from mountain to mountain, depending on the mass and height of the mountain, its proximity to the ocean, and its distance from the equator – a phenomenon known as the Massenerhebung effect (mass-elevation effect).

Characteristic plant communities include:

- Afromontane rain forest. Afromontane rain forests are generally found between 1200 and 2500 metres elevation, where mean annual rainfall is between 1250 and 2500 mm, and which have frequent mists during the one- to five-month dry season. Afromontane rain forest is a closed-canopy rain forest, similar in structure and appearance to some lowland Guineo-Congolian forest types, but differing in species composition. Most trees are evergreen, with only a few larger tree species (Entandrophragma excelsum and Aningeria adolfi-friederici) losing their leaves for a few days during the dry season. Characteristic species are Aningeria adolfi-friederici, Cola greenwayi, Cylicomorpha parviflora, Entandrophragma excelsum, Ficalhoa laurifolia, Gambeya gorungosana, Mitragyna rubrostipulata, Myrianthus holstii, Ochna holstii, Kuloa usambarensis, Olea capensis, Parinari excelsa, Strombosia scheffleri, Syzygium guineense ssp. afromontanum, and Tabernaemontana stapfiana. Tree ferns (Cyathea spp.) are common.
- Afromontane undifferentiated forest. Afromontane undifferentiated forests occur at comparable elevations to Afromontane rain forests (1250 to 2500 m) in areas with lower rainfall (down to 850 mm annually). They have a lower canopy than the rain forests, and have a distinct species composition. Characteristic trees of the undifferentiated forest include Halleria lucida, Ilex mitis, Kiggelaria africana, Nuxia congesta, Nuxia floribunda, Ocotea kenyensis, Podocarpus falcatus, and Myrsine melanophloeos. Podocarpus latifolius, Prunus africana, and Xymalos monospora are common to both the undifferentiated forests and the rain forests.
- Juniperus procera forest. Single-dominant Juniperus procera (African juniper) forests are found on drier slopes at high elevations (1,800 to 2,900 meters), and occasionally as low as 1,000 meters. Average annual rainfall is usually between 1000 and 1150 mm, but can be more than 1250 mm. Juniperus procera does not regenerate in shade, so Juniperus procera forests often appear after forest fires.
- Afromontane bamboo. Dense stands of the bamboo Oldeania alpina are found at high elevations (2400 to 3000 m, and up to 3,500 m on Mount Kenya). They are typically found on rich volcanic soils and gentle slopes where rainfall exceeds 1250 mm annually. The largest bamboo stands are on Mount Kenya (39,000 ha), Kenya's Aberdare Range (65000 ha) and Mau Escarpment (51000 ha) and Mount Meru.
- Afromontane moist transitional forest is found at lower elevations, and contains a mixture of Afromontane and non-Afromontane tree species.

== Fauna ==
There are eight endemic or restricted-range bird species in the ecoregion. The Aberdare cisticola (Cisticola aberdare), Abbott's starling (Cinnyricinclus femoralis), and Kenrick's starling (Poeoptera kenricki) occur on only two or three mountains or mountain ranges in the region. The Hunter's cisticola (Cisticola hunteri), Jackson's francolin (Francolinus jacksoni), and Sharpe's longclaw (Macronyx sharpei) range over most of the mountains in the ecoregion.

Endemic mammals include the shrews Peters's musk shrew (Crocidura gracilipes), Rainey's shrew (Crocidura raineyi), Ultimate shrew (Crocidura ultima), Aberdare mole shrew (Surdisorex norae), and Mount Kenya mole shrew (Surdisorex polulus), and the rodents Grammomys gigas, Tachyoryctes annectens, and Tachyoryctes audax.

Limited-range mammals native to the montane forests include Jackson's mongoose (Bdeogale jacksoni), Abbott's duiker (Cephalophus spadix), Zanj sun squirrel (Heliosciurus undulatus), and eastern tree hyrax (Dendrohyrax validus).

There are nine endemic species of reptiles in the ecoregion, including six species of chameleons, most limited to a single mountain or range, and the montane viper (Vipera hindii).

== Protected areas ==
35% of the ecoregion is in protected areas. Protected areas include Aberdare National Park, Mount Kenya National Park, Mount Elgon National Park, Kilimanjaro National Park, Arusha National Park, Kidepo Valley National Park, Kidepo Game Reserve, Mathews Range Forest Reserve, Mount Nyiru Forest Reserve, Pian Upe Wildlife Reserve, Ngorongoro Conservation Area, and Lake Bogoria National Reserve.

== Gallery ==
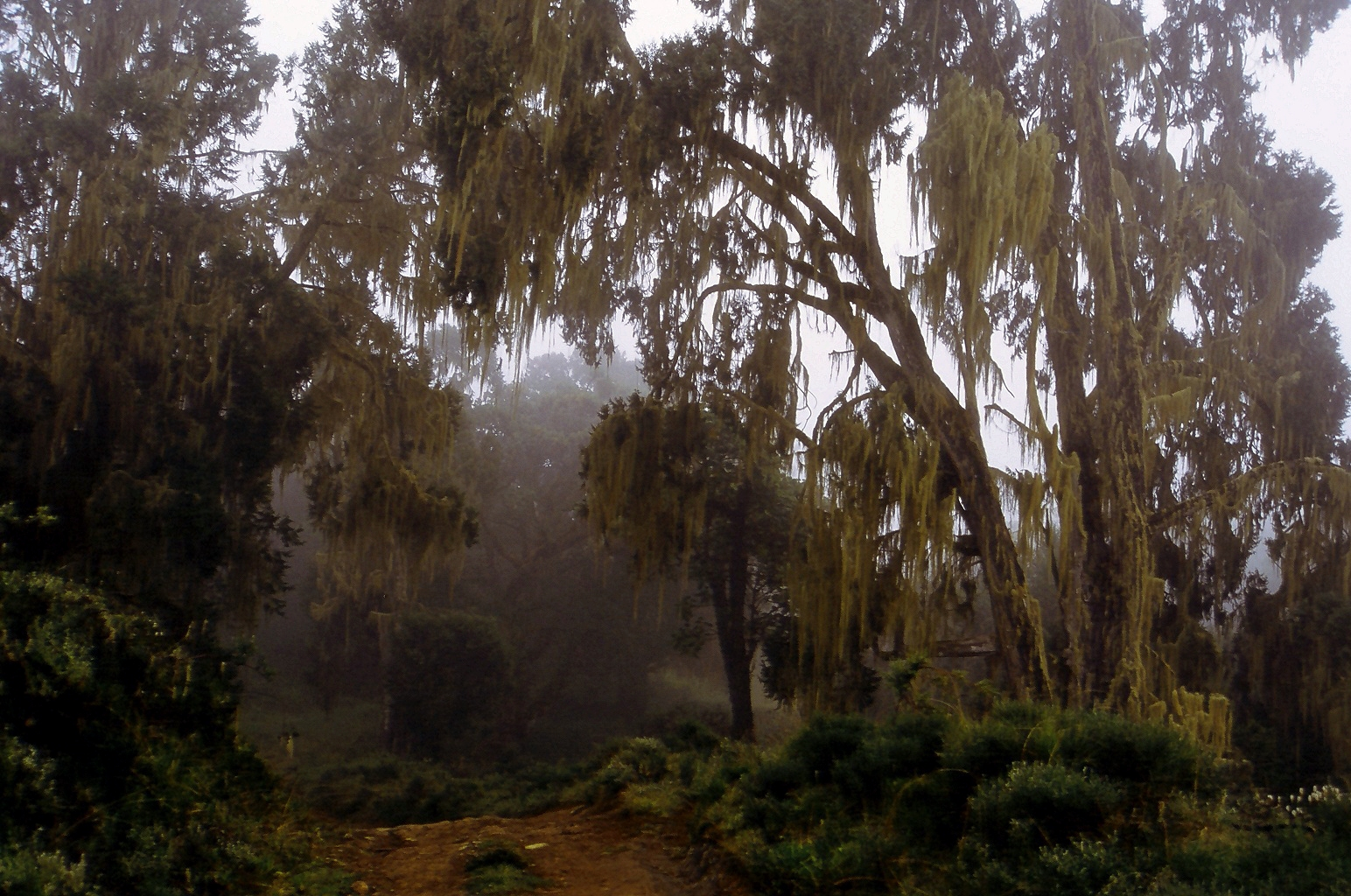
Timberline forest with lichens on Mount Kenya

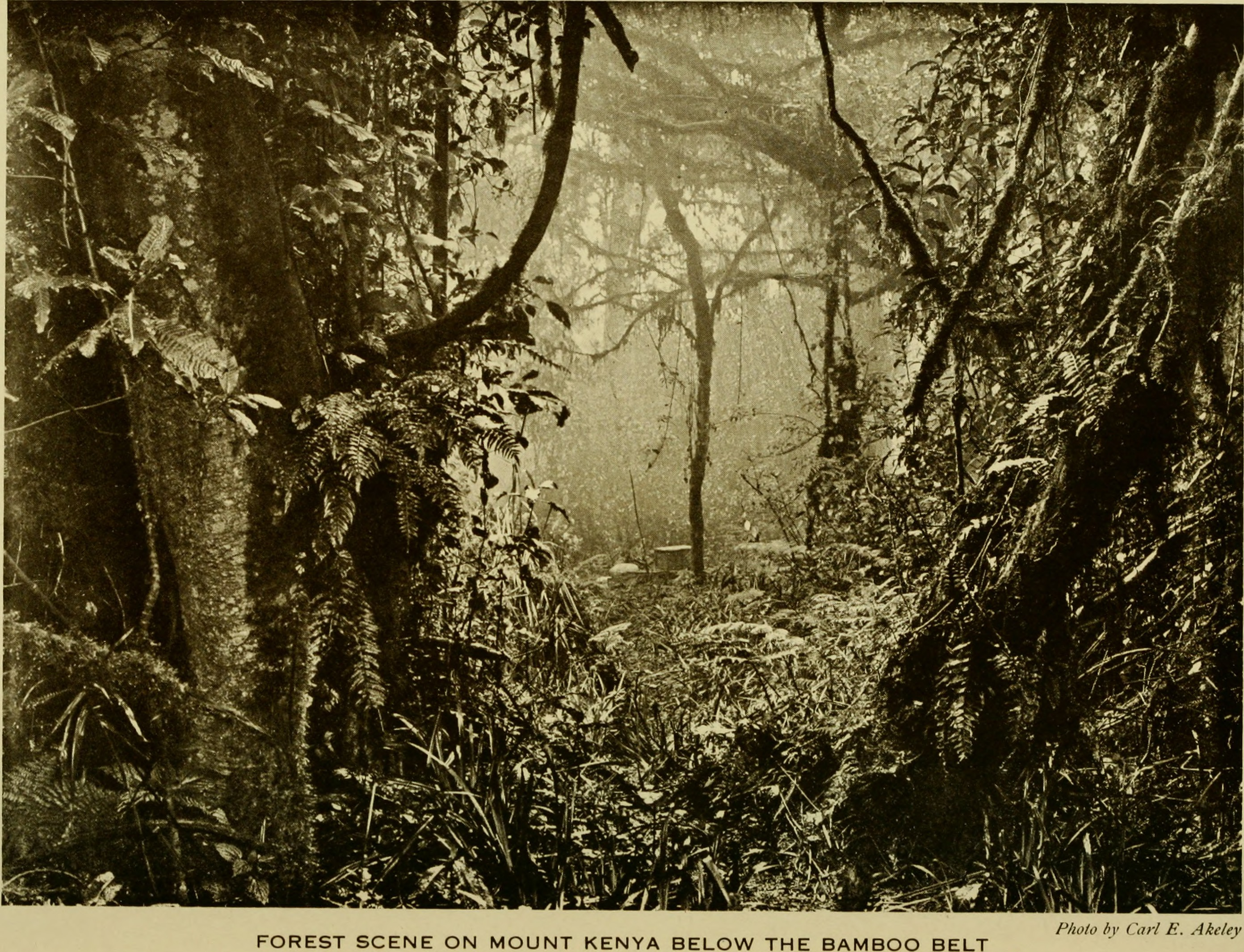
Montane forest below the bamboo zone on Mount Kenya

Montane forests of Mount Kenya from space

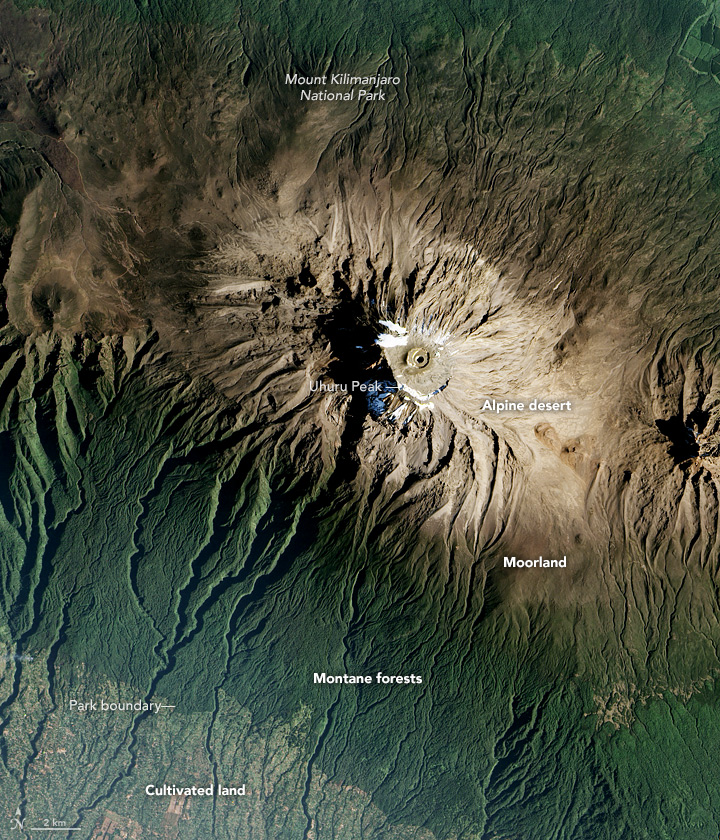
Montane forests of Mount Kilimanjaro from space
