= Acraea polis =

Scientific classification
- Kingdom: Animalia
- Phylum: Arthropoda
- Class: Insecta
- Order: Lepidoptera
- Family: Nymphalidae
- Genus: Acraea
- Species: A. polis

Binomial name
- Acraea polis Pierre, 1999

Synonyms
- Acraea (Actinote) polis

Species of butterfly

Acraea polis, the western musanga acraea, is a butterfly in the family Nymphalidae. It is found in Guinea, Sierra Leone, Liberia, Ivory Coast, Ghana, Nigeria and western Cameroon.

== Biology ==
The habitat consists of secondary forests with Musanga species.

The larvae feed on Musanga cecropioides, Boehmeria and Myrianthus species.

== Taxonomy ==
See Pierre & Bernau, 2014
