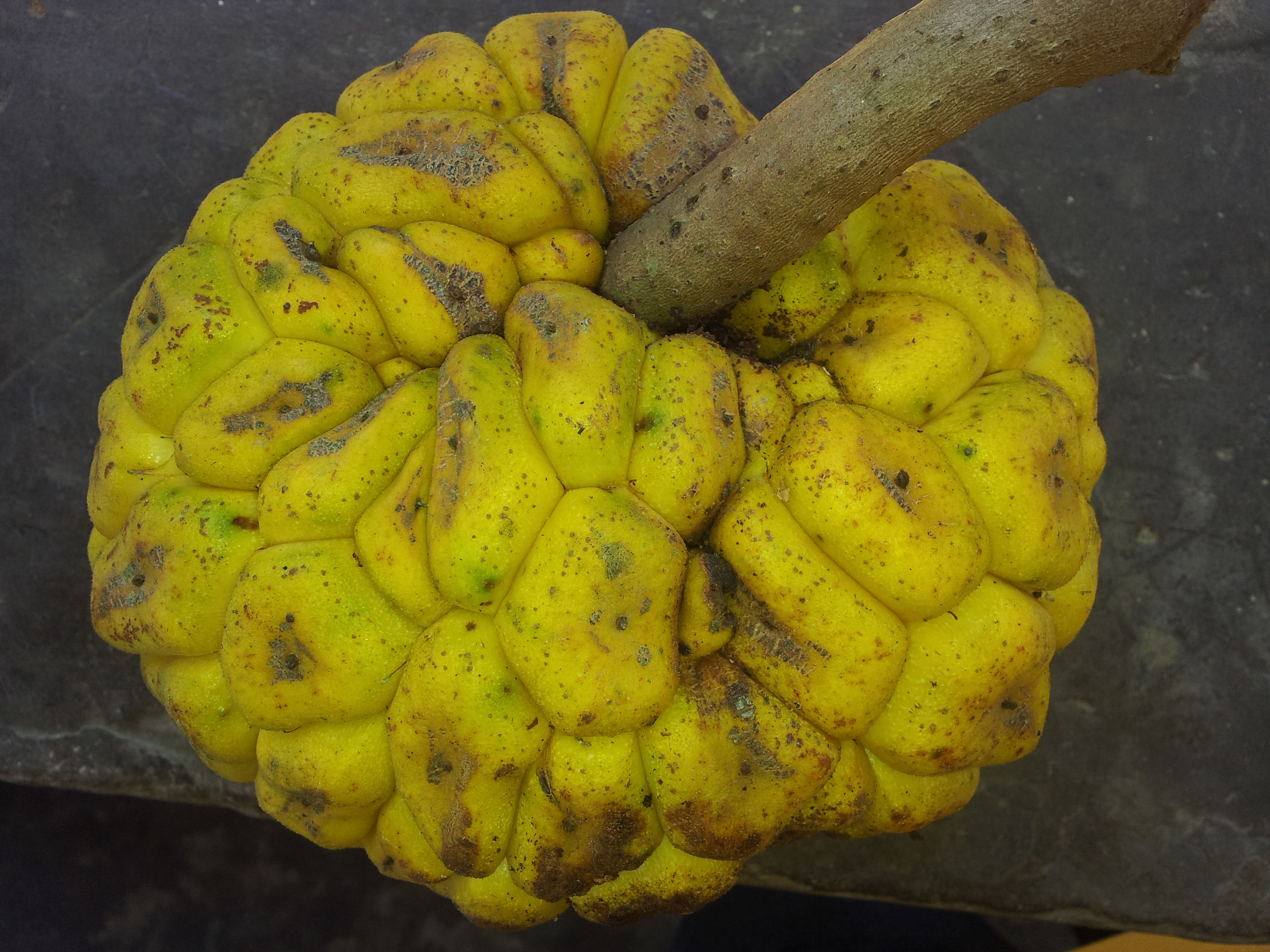

Scientific classification
- Kingdom: Plantae
- Clade: Tracheophytes
- Clade: Angiosperms
- Clade: Eudicots
- Clade: Rosids
- Order: Rosales
- Family: Urticaceae
- Genus: Myrianthus
- Species: M. arboreus

Binomial name
- Myrianthus arboreus P. Beauv. 1804

= Myrianthus arboreus =

Species of tree

Myrianthus arboreus, commonly known as the giant yellow mulberry or monkey fruit, is a dioecious tropical tree in the genus Myrianthus. It lives in the tropical Central African countries of Central African Republic, Gabon, Cameroon, Nigeria, and Tanzania, and also Ghana in the West African countries. Its chromosome count is 2n = 28.

It is locally known as nyankama among the Asante people of Ghana, and ekanhou in Eastern Gabon.

== Description ==
The species grows as a shrub or small tree that can reach a height of 10 m and occasionally taller. The bark is greyish to green while the slash is white. Leaves are arranged in a spiral form and are often palmately compound, stipules are long (3 - 5 cm) and commonly covered in hairs. The outline of the leaflet lanceolate with a serrate to dentate margin, leaflets can reach up to 65 cm long and 22 cm wide. The infructescences is up to 15 cm in diameter, the fruit drupe like in shape, yellow to orange-red in color, the endocarp is up to 1.7 cm long and 0.8 cm wide.

== Distribution and habitat ==
The species occurs in Tropical Africa, from Guinea eastwards to the Sudan and southwards to Tanzania. Commonly found in lowland forest environments.

== Chemistry ==
Chemical compounds isolated from extracts of the species includes a few ursane type triterpenoids, tormentic, myrianthic and euscaphic acids and flavanols: epicatechin and dulcisflavan.

== Uses ==
The seeds of M. arboreus are eaten cooked; the leaves are made into a vegetable soup called ofe ujuju, or used as livestock feed.

Stem bark and leaf extracts are prepared as part of a decoction used in pain management and in the treatment of diabetes, dysentery, wounds and infections.
