= East African montane moorlands =

Ecoregion in Africa

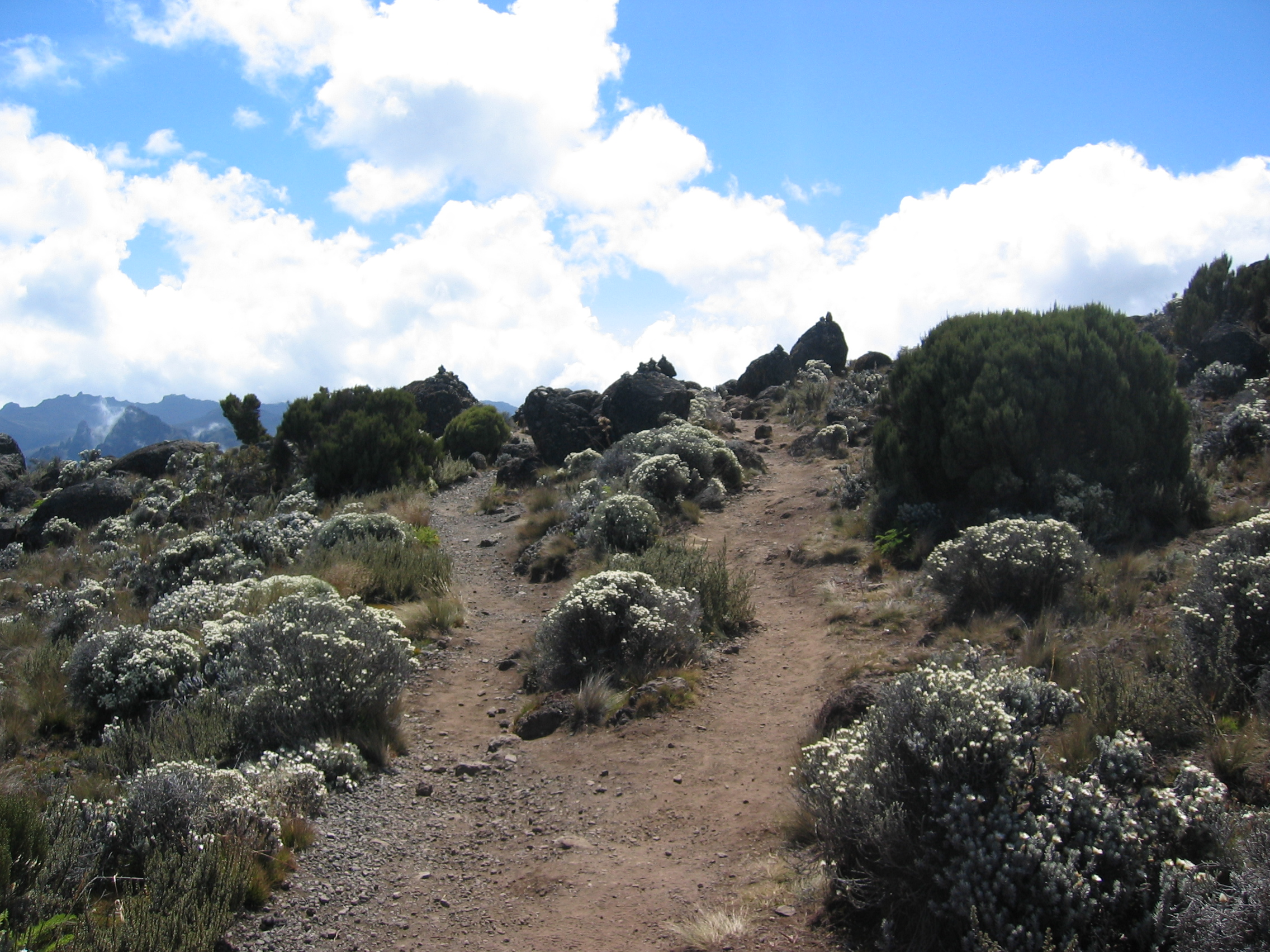
- Shira moorlands on Mount Kilimanjaro

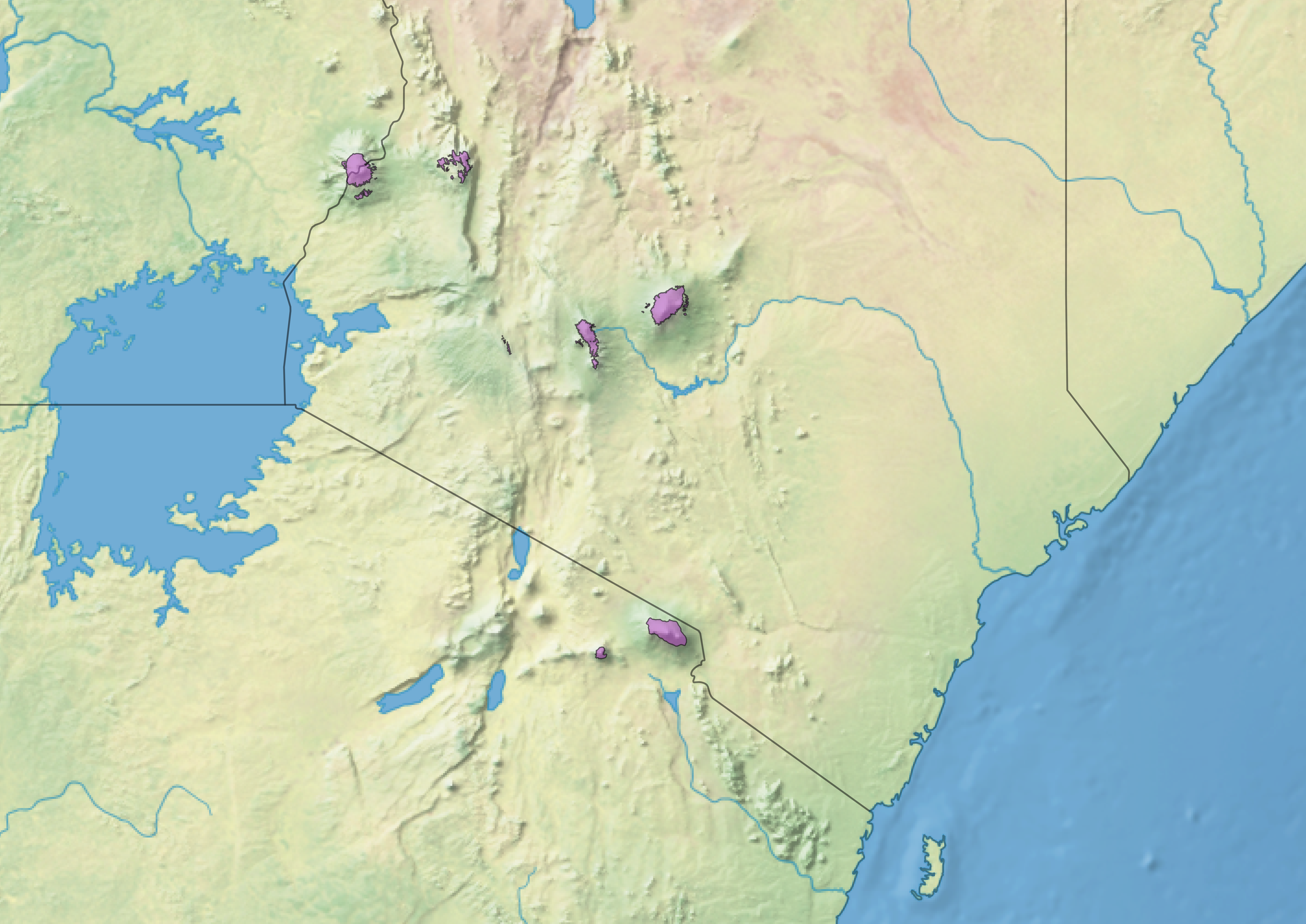
- Map of the East African montane moorlands (purple)

Ecology
- Realm: Afrotropical
- Biome: montane grasslands and shrublands
- Borders: East African montane forests

Geography
- Area: 3,089 km^{2} (1,193 sq mi)
- Countries: Kenya; Tanzania; Uganda

Conservation
- Protected: 2,666 km² (86%)

The East African montane moorlands is a montane grasslands and shrublands ecoregion which occupies several high mountain peaks in Kenya, South Sudan, Tanzania, and Uganda.

== Geography ==
The ecoregion occupies an area of 3,300 square kilometers (1,300 sq mi), covering several small mountaintop enclaves. These include Mount Elgon on the Uganda-Kenya border, the Aberdare Mountains and Mount Kenya in Kenya, and Mount Meru, Mount Kilimanjaro, and Ngorongoro Crater in Tanzania.

The ecoregion occupies areas higher than 3,500 metres (11,500 ft) in elevation. Below the montane moorlands is the East African montane forests ecoregion.

== Flora ==
Plant communities include ericaceous woodland, wooded grassland, Dendrosenecio woodland, wooded grassland, tussock grassland, Helichrysum shrub, and swamps or mires. The flora includes many Afroalpine endemic species which are adapted to the harsh conditions. Adaptations include rosette forms, tussock forms, and silvery leaves. From 3500 to 4500 meters elevation, plants can grow up to eight meters high, and include giant species of Dendrosenecio and Lobelia. Tussock grasslands are found in dry and fire-prone areas. Helichrysum scrub is found on dry and rocky slopes. Above 4500 meters elevation, vegetation is mostly low cushion plants, including Agrostis sclerophylla and Sagina afroalpina, which extend up to the limit of vegetation at around 5000 meters. The East African moorland flora has much in common with that of the Rwenzori-Virunga montane moorlands.

== Fauna ==
The montane moorlands ecoregion shares several limited-range bird species with the lower-elevation East African montane forests. Hunter's cisticola (Cisticola hunteri) is found on all the mountains in the ecoregion. Jackson's francolin (Pternistis jacksoni) and Sharpe's pipit (Macronyx sharpei) is found on Mount Elgon, the Aberdare Range, and Mount Kenya. The Aberdare cisticola (Cisticola aberdare) is found only in the Aberdare Mountains and the Mau Escarpment. The Mountain Bongo (Tragelaphus eurycerus isaaci) is also associated with the montane forests in the Kenya highlands, and formerly occurred in and around forested mountain zones of Mt. Kenya, the Aberdares, Mau forest, Cherengani hills and Chepalungu hills in Kenya and Mount Elgon in Kenya and Uganda.

== Protected areas ==
Protected areas in the ecoregion include Aberdare National Park, Aberdare Forest Reserve, Mount Kenya National Park, Mount Kenya Forest Reserve, Mount Elgon National Park, Kilimanjaro National Park, Arusha National Park, and Kipipiri Forest Reserve.
