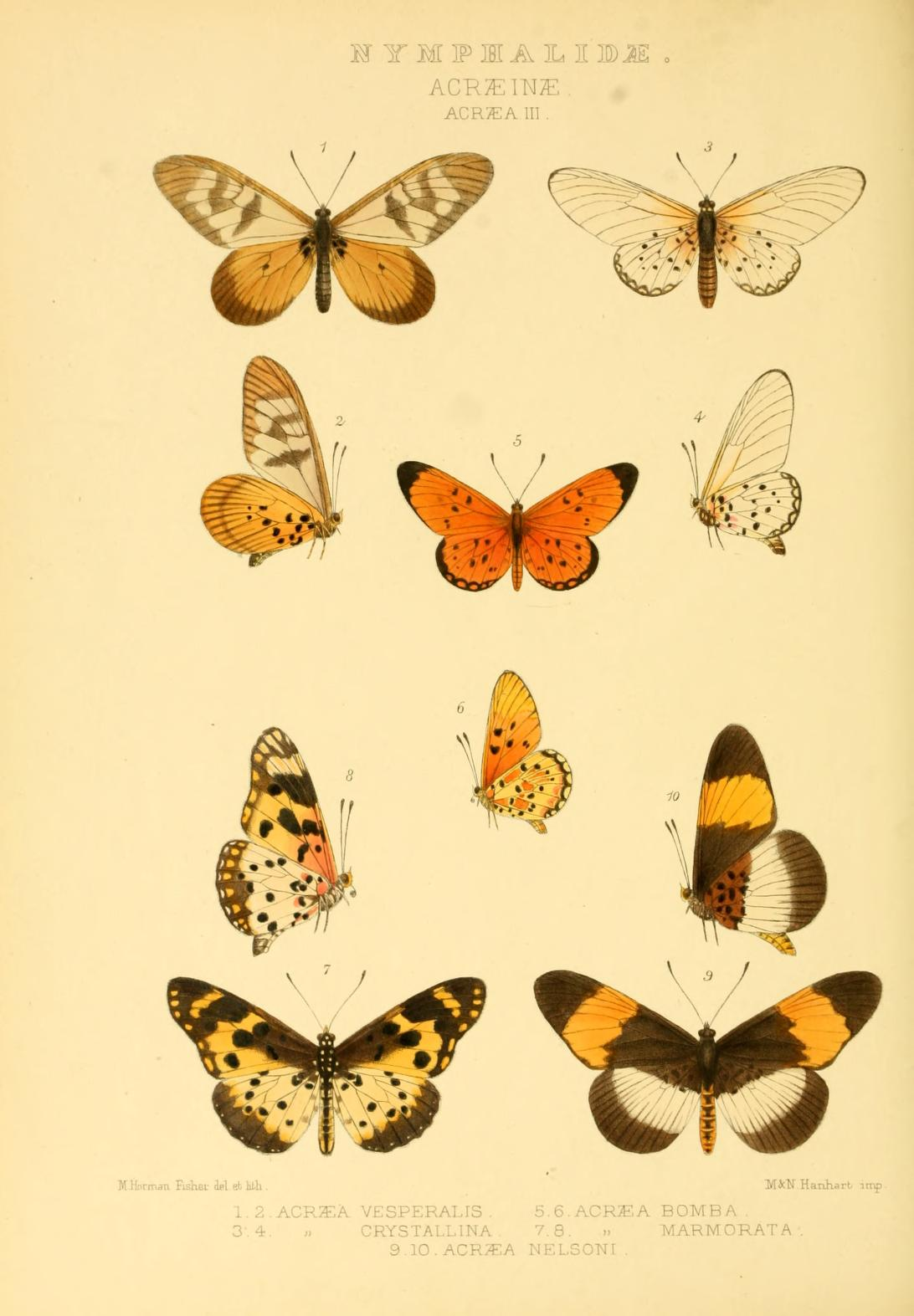

Scientific classification
- Kingdom: Animalia
- Phylum: Arthropoda
- Clade: Pancrustacea
- Class: Insecta
- Order: Lepidoptera
- Family: Nymphalidae
- Genus: Acraea
- Species: A. vesperalis

Binomial name
- Acraea vesperalis Grose-Smith, 1890

Synonyms
- Acraea (Actinote) vesperalis; Acraea catori Bethune-Baker, 1904; Acraea vesperalis ab. punctula Strand, 1914; Acraea vesperalis ab. picta Schouteden, 1919

= Acraea vesperalis =

Species of butterfly

Acraea vesperalis, the rare musanga acraea, is a butterfly in the family Nymphalidae. It is found in Guinea, Sierra Leone, Ivory Coast, Ghana, Nigeria, Cameroon, the Republic of the Congo, the Central African Republic, the Democratic Republic of the Congo and Uganda.

== Description ==
A. vesperalis Smith (56 f). Fore wing broadly darkened at the apex and distal margin, semitransparent and with distinct dark transverse bands. Hind wing above light ochre-yellow with black-brown marginal band about 4 mm. in breadth, beneath dark ochre-yellow with long dark streaks on the interneural folds. Sierra Leone to the Congo and Uganda. - catori Beth. Baker. Ground-colour of the hindwing light yellow. Sierra Leone.

Torben Larsen developed a species numbering system for his 2005 publication Butterflies of West Africa. The subspecies catori is #1169. The 'Larsen' numbers have since been used with permission in A Sharp Eye on Butterflies of Ghana.

== Biology ==
The habitat consists of forests.

The larvae feed on Musanga and Myrianthus species.

== Taxonomy ==
It is a member of the Acraea pentapolis species group.- but see also Pierre & Bernaud, 2014
