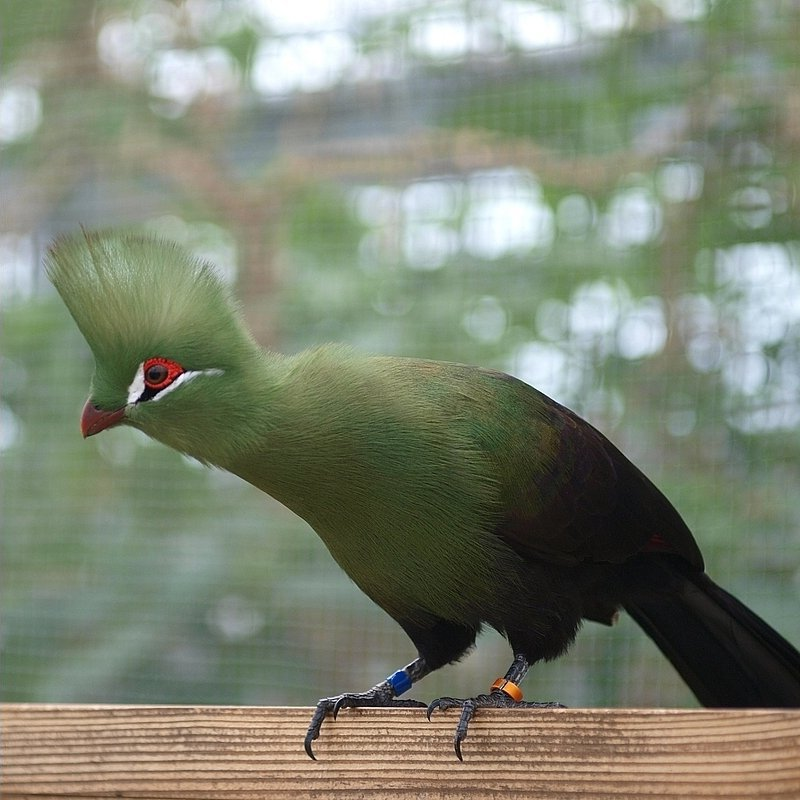

Conservation status
- Least Concern (IUCN 3.1)

Scientific classification
- Kingdom: Animalia
- Phylum: Chordata
- Class: Aves
- Order: Musophagiformes
- Family: Musophagidae
- Genus: Tauraco
- Species: T. persa

Binomial name
- Tauraco persa (Linnaeus, 1758)
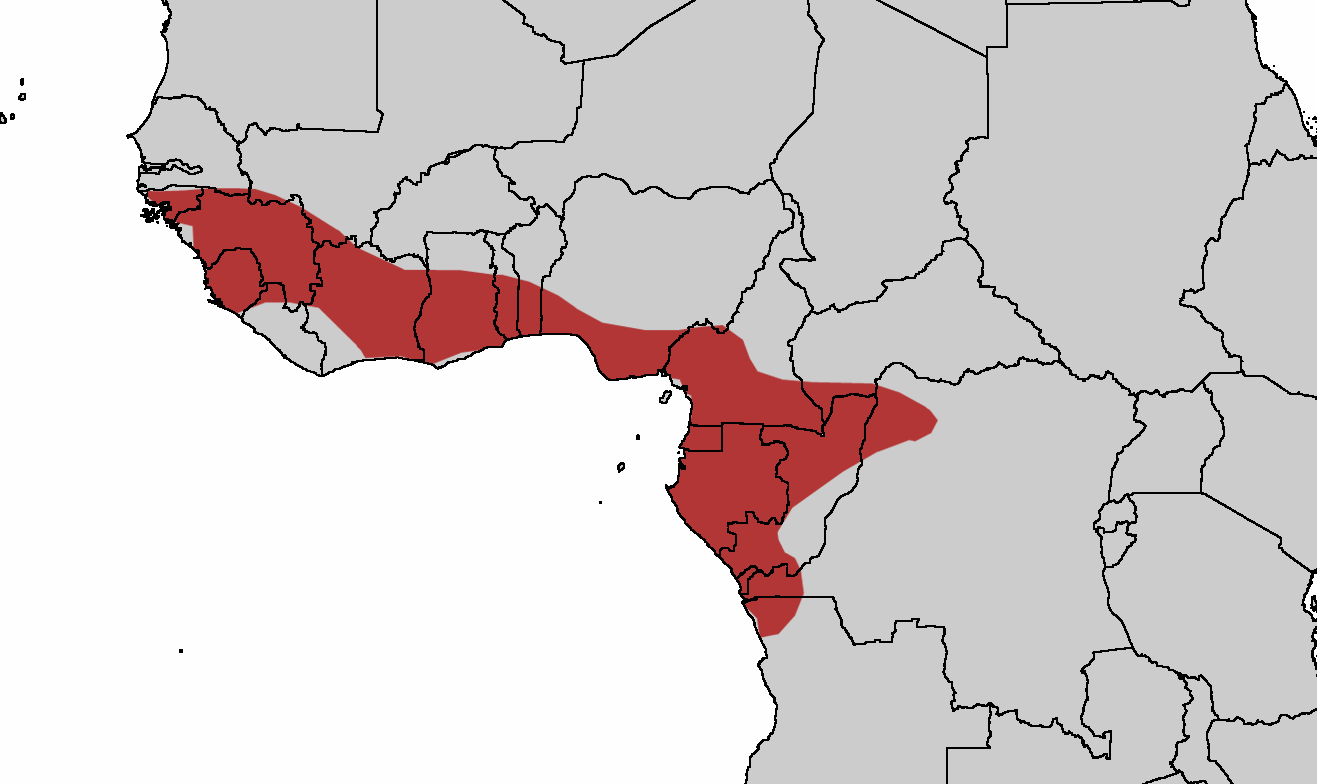
- Distribution of the Guinea turaco

Synonyms
- Cuculus persa Linnaeus, 1758

= Guinea turaco =

Species of bird

The Guinea turaco (Tauraco persa), also known as the green turaco or green lourie, is a species of turaco, a group of African otidimorph birds. It formerly included the Livingstone's, Schalow's, Knysna, black-billed and Fischer's turacos as subspecies.

== Taxonomy ==
The Guinea turaco was formally described by the Swedish naturalist Carl Linnaeus in 1758 in the tenth edition of his Systema Naturae. He placed it together with the cuckoos in the genus Cuculus and coined the binomial name Cuculus persa. The specific epithet is Latin meaning "Persian". Linnaeus based his description on the "Touraco" that had been described and illustrated in 1743 by the English naturalist George Edwards in his A Natural History of Uncommon Birds. Edwards's specimen had been brought to London from Guinea in West Africa. The Guinea turaco is now placed in the genus Tauraco that was introduced in 1779 by the Polish naturalist Jan Krzysztof Kluk.

Three subspecies are recognised:

- T. p. buffoni (Vieillot, 1819) – Senegambia to Liberia
- T. p. persa (Linnaeus, 1758) – Ivory Coast and Ghana to west Cameroon
- T. p. zenkeri Reichenow, 1896 – south Cameroon, west Central African Republic, Equatorial Guinea, Gabon, north Angola, Congo and northwest DRCongo

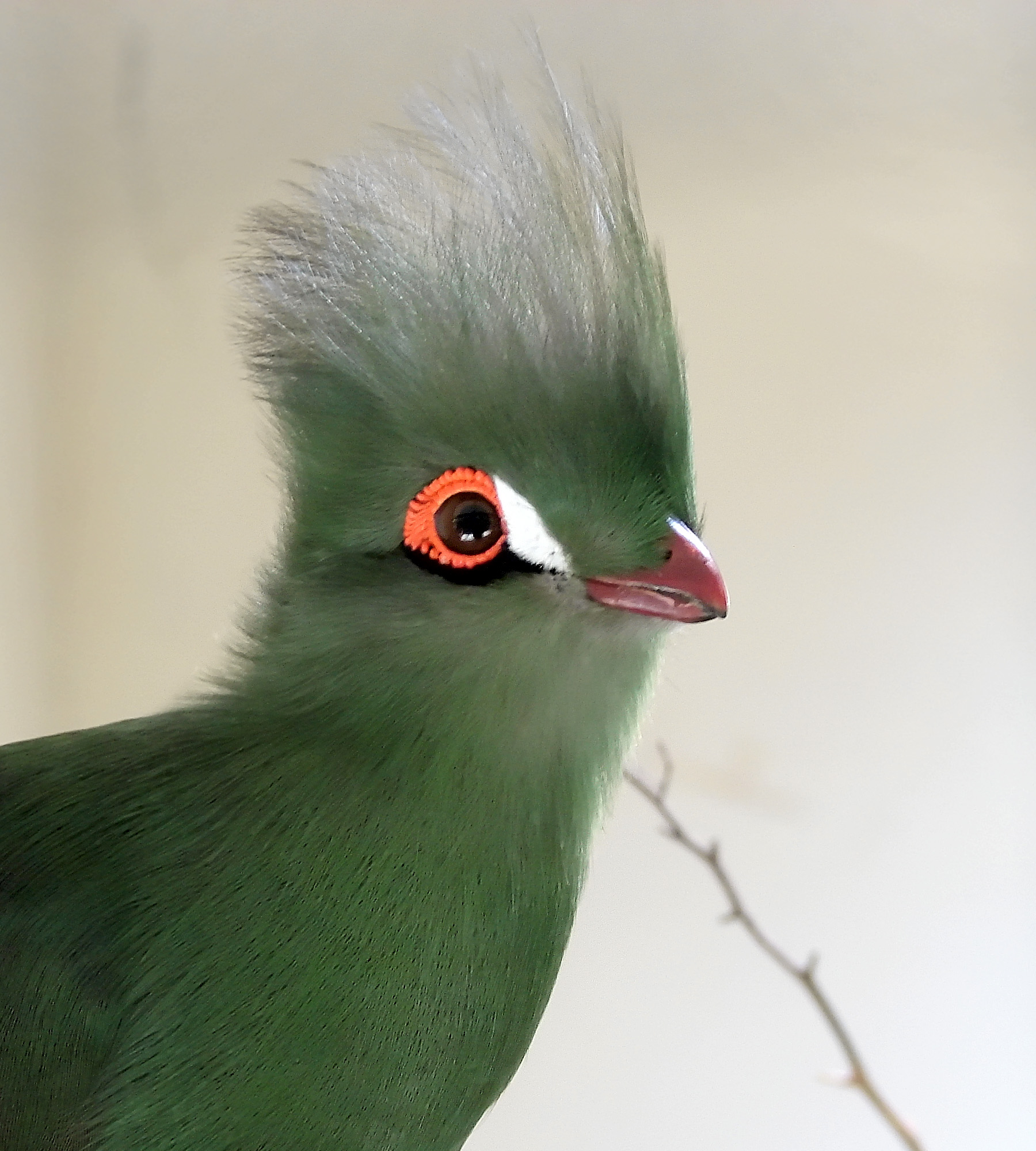
T. persa buffoni is the only subspecies without a white line below the eye.

== Description ==
The Guinea turaco, often inconspicuous in the treetops, is approximately 40–43 cm (16–17 in) long, including a long tail. The weight can reach 225–290 g (7.9–10.2 oz). The plumage is largely brilliant green and blue, with the green color coming from the pigment turacoverdin; the tail and wings are dark purplish, except for the crimson primary feathers that are very distinct in flight. On the head is present an erectile semi-circular green crest. On the eyes there are red and white patches. The bill is thick and red. In the westernmost subspecies Tauraco persa buffoni, which sometimes is known as the Buffon's turaco, there is a white line above and in front of the eye and a black line below the eye. In the nominate subspecies (Tauraco persa persa) of the central part of its range and zenkeri of the southeastern part there also is a second white line below the black line. Unlike similar turacos with red bills, even adult Guinea turacos lack a white rear edge to the crest.

The Guinea turaco has a loud cawr-cawr call, consisting of 10–16 raucous cawing notes.

== Distribution and habitat ==
Guinea turaco has an extremely large range and a stable population. It can be found in forests of West and Central Africa, ranging from Senegal east to DR Congo and south to northern Angola. It is present in the Republic of the Congo, Angola, Benin, Cameroon, Central African Republic, Democratic Republic of the Congo, Equatorial Guinea, Gabon, Gambia, Ghana, Guinea, Guinea-Bissau, Ivory Coast, Liberia, Mali, Nigeria, Senegal, Sierra Leone and Togo.

This species inhabits subtropical and tropical moist lowland, gallery forests and tropical rain forests edge, often near cultivated areas. It is common in climax forest with plentiful tall trees, from sea level to about 1,100 m (3,600 ft).

== Behaviour and ecology ==
Video clip

Tauraco persa is normally sedentary and strongly territorial. These birds feed on wide variety of wild and cultivated tropical fruits (for instance on Musanga, Macaranga, Rauvolfia, Cissus and Ficus species, etc.), but also on blossoms. They do not fly very well, preferring to climb from branch to branch.

They breed in May–June and August in Cameroon, from December to February and from June to September in Gabon, while in Sierra Leone they breed in June and in October. Females lay two eggs in a tree platform nest.
