= Rainey's shrew =

Conservation status
- Endangered (IUCN 3.1)

Scientific classification
- Kingdom: Animalia
- Phylum: Chordata
- Class: Mammalia
- Order: Eulipotyphla
- Family: Soricidae
- Genus: Crocidura
- Species: C. raineyi

Binomial name
- Crocidura raineyi Heller, 1912
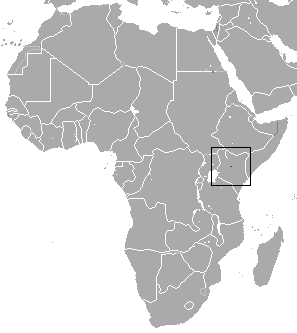
- Rainey's shrew range

Species of mammal

Rainey's shrew (Crocidura raineyi) is a species of mammal in the family Soricidae. It is endemic to Mount Gargues in the Matthews Range of Kenya. Its natural habitat is montane forests.
