= Ndoto Mountains =

Mountain range in Kenya

- Location within Kenya

Highest point
- Coordinates: 1°46′13″N 37°8′31″E

The Ndoto Mountains are a mountain range in northern Kenya.

Like Mount Nyiru to the north and the Mathews Range to the south, the Ndoto Mountains consist of Precambrian crystalline basement rock, mostly extremely durable gneisses and granites.

The climate is semi-arid at lower elevations. At higher elevations there are areas of higher rainfall, humidity, and cloud cover which support montane forests.

The Ndotos Range Forest Reserve was established in 1956, and covers an area of 932.05 km^{2}. The reserve contains about 101.55 km^{2} of dense forest.
