= Musanga =

Musanga may refer to:

- Musanga (plant), a genus of plants in the family Urticaceae
- Musanga, Burundi, a village in Burundi
