= Nyiro shrew =

Conservation status
- Endangered (IUCN 3.1)

Scientific classification
- Kingdom: Animalia
- Phylum: Chordata
- Class: Mammalia
- Order: Eulipotyphla
- Family: Soricidae
- Genus: Crocidura
- Species: C. macowi

Binomial name
- Crocidura macowi Dollman, 1915
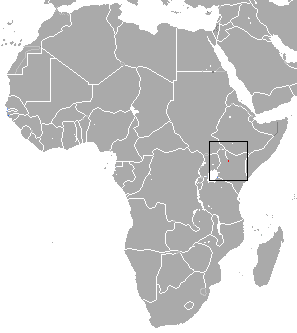
- Nyiro shrew range

Species of mammal

The Nyiro shrew (Crocidura macowi) is a species of mammal in the family Soricidae. It is endemic to Mount Nyiro in northern Kenya. This is a small shrew with dark brown dorsal pelage and grayish brown or slate gray ventral pelage.
