= Monkey fruit =

Monkey fruit is a common name for several plants and can refer to some species in the following genera:

- Artocarpus, particularly Artocarpus lacucha and Artocarpus rigidus
- Garcinia, particularly Garcinia intermedia
- Limonia
- Myrianthus
