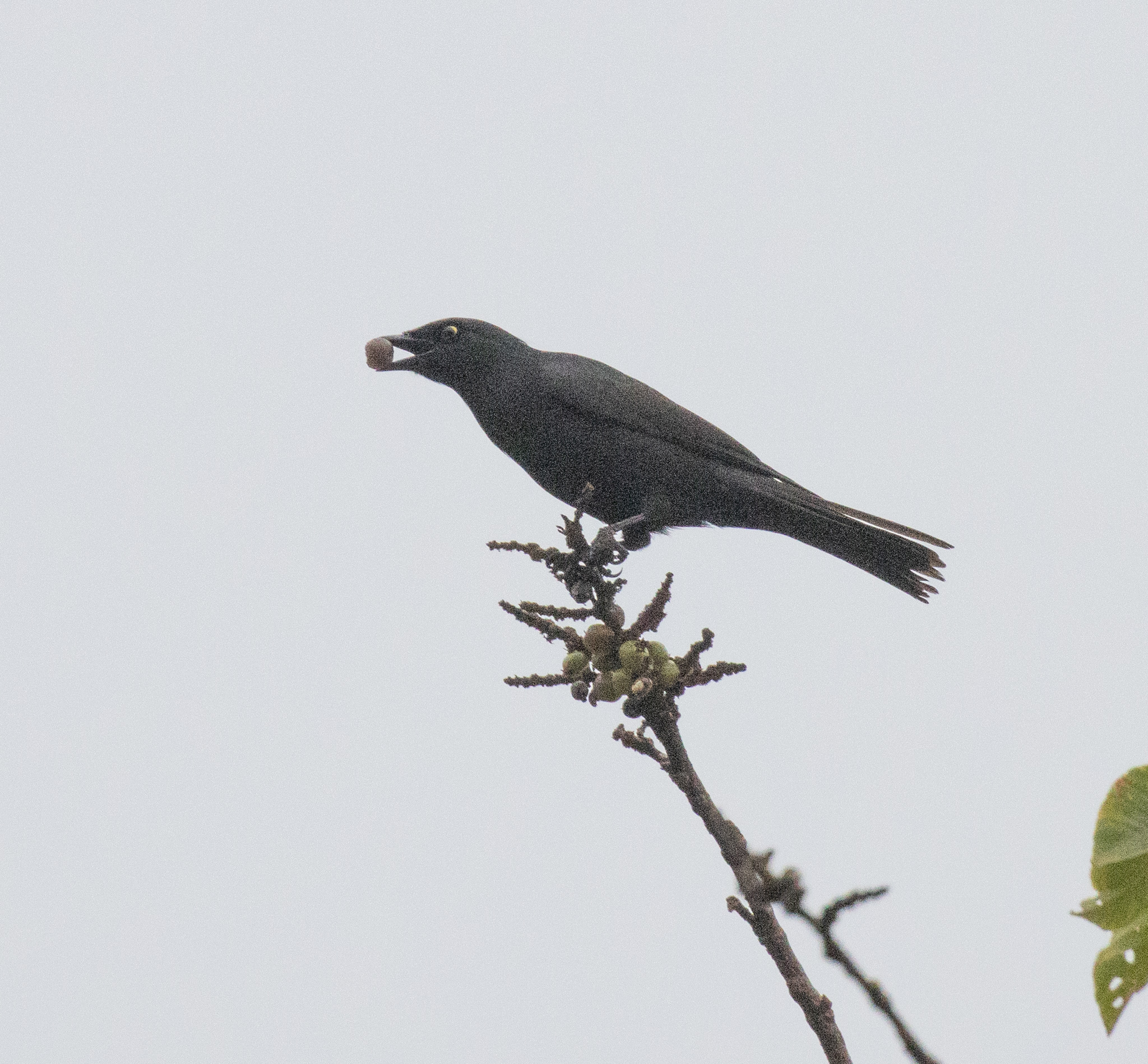

Conservation status
- Least Concern (IUCN 3.1)

Scientific classification
- Kingdom: Animalia
- Phylum: Chordata
- Class: Aves
- Order: Passeriformes
- Family: Sturnidae
- Genus: Poeoptera
- Species: P. kenricki

Binomial name
- Poeoptera kenricki Shelley, 1894

= Kenrick's starling =

Species of bird

Kenrick's starling (Poeoptera kenricki) is a species of starling in the family Sturnidae. It is found in Kenya and Tanzania.

== Taxonomy ==
Kenrick's starling was described by George Ernest Shelley in 1894 and was named after Major Reginald Watkin Edward-Kenrick, an officer in the British army who collected the holotype in the Usambara Mountains in Tanzania. Shelley placed the starling in the obsolete genus Stillbopsar, which was composed of it alongside Stuhlmann's starling. It is now placed in the genus Poeoptera, meaning "poet bird" in Greek, with Poeo being a variation of the Greek poiéō which means "to create" - being the origin of poema, the Latin word for poem - and ptera coming from the pterá which means wing. Up until the mid 20th century, some authorities considered it conspecific with Stuhlmann's starling, or treated it as one single subspecies. There are currently two recognized subspecies:

- Poeoptera kenricki kenricki - (Shelley, 1894): Nominate subspecies, described from the mountainous montane forests of Tanzania
- Poeoptera kenricki bensoni - (Van Someren, 1945): Found around the eastern slopes of Mount Kenya

== Description ==
Kenrick's starling is a medium-sized bird with male weighing 50g and females weighing 38g. Like other birds in its genus, males are a glossy black colour and females are an ashy grey. Females also possess chestnut-coloured primary feathers, which are most easily seen during flight. It can be differentiated from Stuhlmann's starling mainly by range, with the two being separated by the Rift Valley. Kenrick's starling also has a yellow eye as compared to the slaty one of Stuhlmann's starling, although this feature is not always apparent in the field. The two subspecies differ slightly in morphology, with P. k. bensoni being larger, with a heavier bill, and a more noticeable change in colour between the lower and upper breast than P. k. kenricki.

== Behaviour ==
Kenrick's starlings are cavity nesters, and have been observed nesting in the old holes of woodpeckers and barbets. Whether it also uses natural cavities is unknown. It prefers to nest in cavities that are made in dead trees or dead limbs of trees. Very little is known about its rearing behaviour besides the fact that both parents feed the chick.

== Distribution & habitat ==
It is found in Kenya and Tanzania, with a recent record also coming from Malawi of a flock of over 150 birds. In Kenya it is found in the area surrounding Mount Kenya. In Tanzania it is found in the east and northeast in the Usambara and Uluguru Mountains as well as at Mount Kilimanjaro and Mount Meru.
