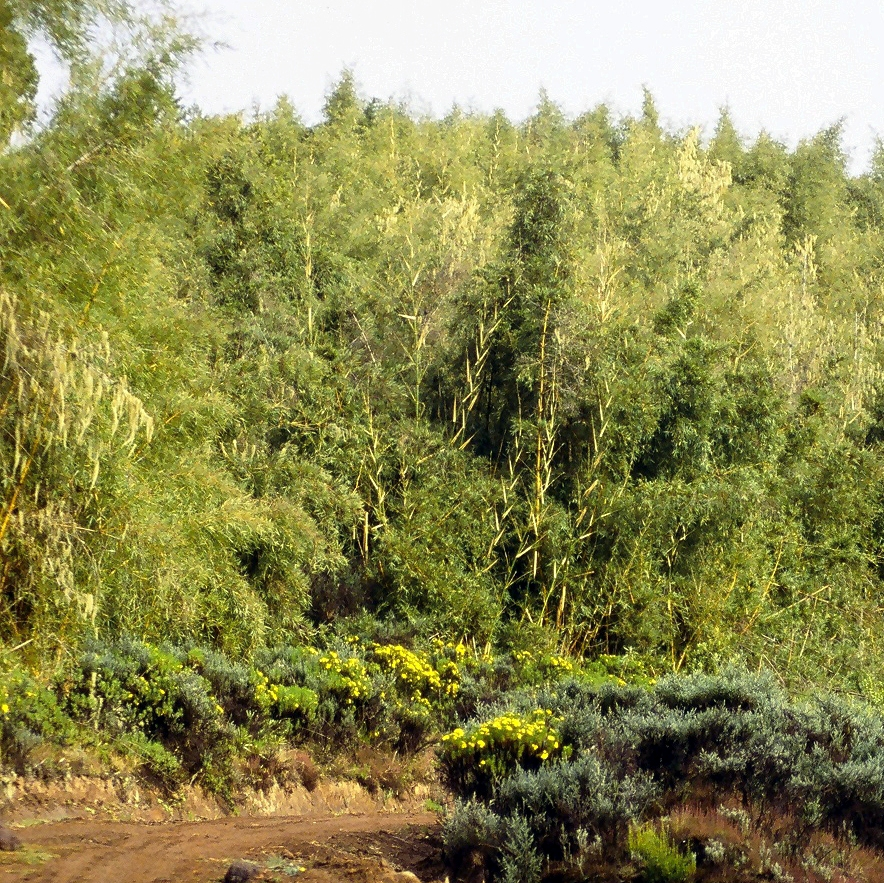

Scientific classification
- Kingdom: Plantae
- Clade: Tracheophytes
- Clade: Angiosperms
- Clade: Monocots
- Clade: Commelinids
- Order: Poales
- Family: Poaceae
- Genus: Oldeania; Stapleton

= Oldeania =

Genus of plants

Oldeania is a genus of flowering plants belonging to the family Poaceae.

Its native range is Ethiopia to Zambia, Madagascar.

== Species ==
Species:

- Oldeania alpina (K.Schum.) Stapleton
- Oldeania humbertii (A.Camus) D.Z.Li, Y.X.Zhang & Haev.
- Oldeania ibityensis (A.Camus) D.Z.Li, Y.X.Zhang & Haev.
- Oldeania itremoensis D.Z.Li, Y.X.Zhang & Haev.
- Oldeania madagascariensis (A.Camus) D.Z.Li, Y.X.Zhang & Haev.
- Oldeania marojejyensis (A.Camus) D.Z.Li, Y.X.Zhang & Haev.
- Oldeania perrieri (A.Camus) D.Z.Li, Y.X.Zhang & Haev.
