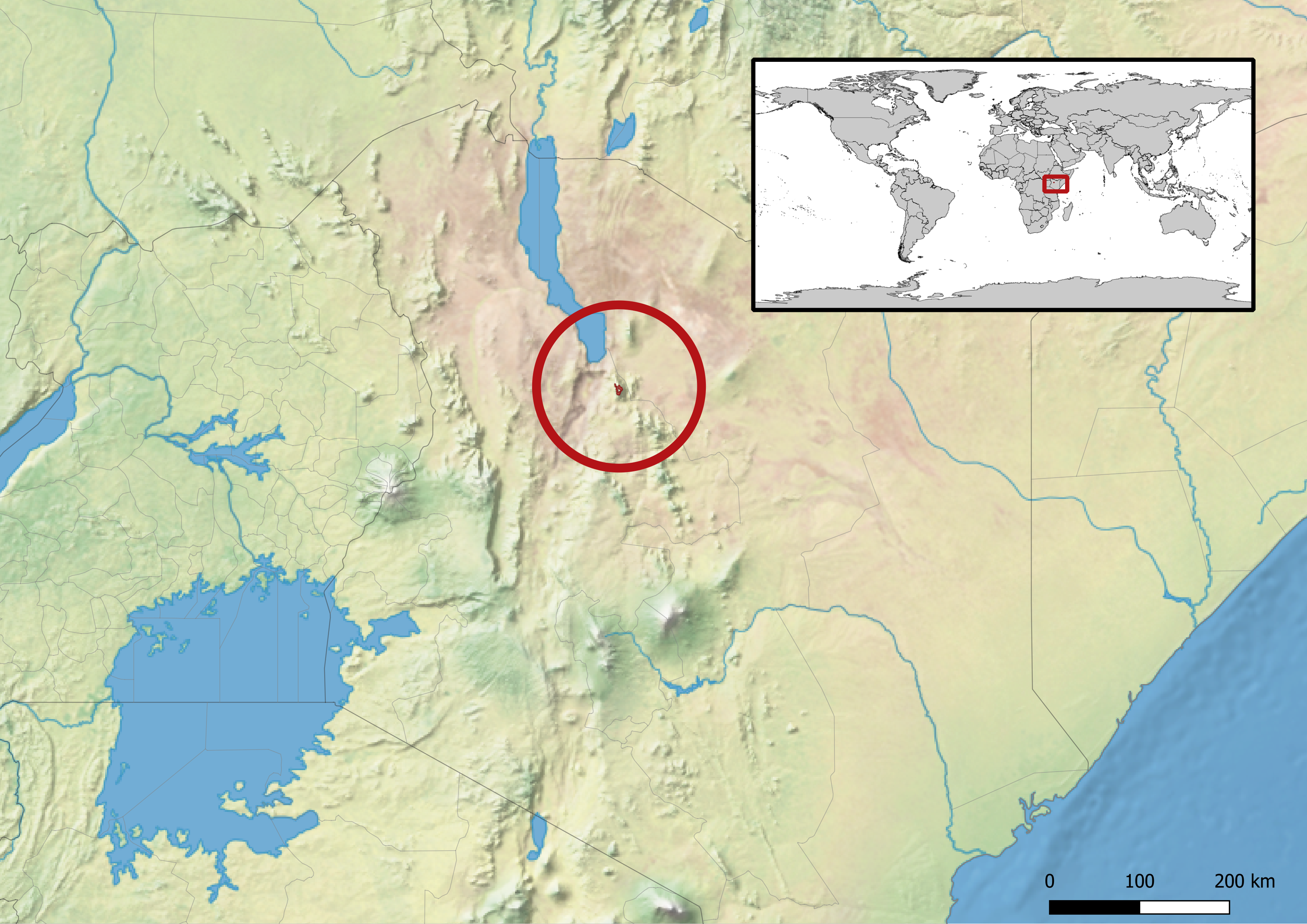
- Distribution of Kinyongia asheorum

Conservation status
- Near Threatened (IUCN 3.1)

Scientific classification
- Kingdom: Animalia
- Phylum: Chordata
- Class: Reptilia
- Order: Squamata
- Suborder: Iguania
- Family: Chamaeleonidae
- Genus: Kinyongia
- Species: K. asheorum

Binomial name
- Kinyongia asheorum Nečas, Sindaco, Kořený, Kopečná, Malonza & Modrý, 2009

= Kinyongia asheorum =

Species of lizard

Kinyongia asheorum, also known commonly as the Mount Nyiro bearded chameleon, is a species of lizard in the family Chamaeleonidae. The species is endemic to Kenya. Only four specimens are known.

== Etymology ==
The specific name, asheorum (Latin, genitive, plural), is in honor of British-Kenyan herpetologist James Ashe (1925–2004), and his wife Sanda (1944–2018).

== Description ==
K. asheorum is medium-sized, reaching a maximum size of about 22 cm (8.7 in) (of which about 60% is tail). It has a distinct head casque, a pointed snout, and two horns on the tip of the snout. It is uniformly dark green with several white spots and brownish ridges.

== Distribution and habitat ==
K. asheorum is only known to occur on Mount Nyiro in Kenya, where it was collected in a single patch of forest at an altitude of 2,000–2,450 m (6,560–8,040 ft). It inhabits large trees with extensive canopy cover.

== Conservation ==
While the species K. asheorum appears not to be under direct threat, it has a very restricted distribution and may be impacted by logging, forest fires, and grazing outside the forest. It has been classified as Near Threatened by the IUCN.
