= Zenker's turaco =

Conservation status
- Least Concern (IUCN 3.1)

Scientific classification
- Kingdom: Animalia
- Phylum: Chordata
- Class: Aves
- Order: Musophagiformes
- Family: Musophagidae
- Genus: Tauraco
- Species: T. persa
- Subspecies: T. p. zenkeri

Trinomial name
- Tauraco persa zenkeri Reichenow, 1896

Subspecies of bird

Zenker's turaco (Tauraco persa zenkeri), is a subspecies of the Guinea turaco. It is a green turaco, in the family Musophagidae, subfamily Tauracinae, a group of near-passerines birds. Zenker's turaco is found in forests of Central Africa in the Congo Basin in Gabon, DR Congo and Congo-Brazzaville and south to northern Angola. It forms part of a superspecies complex that extends from West Africa to East Africa and as far south as the Cape in Southern Africa and include the black-billed turaco, Emin's turaco, Schalow's turaco, Livingstone's turaco, the Transvaal turaco and the Knysna turaco, as subspecies within the group.
