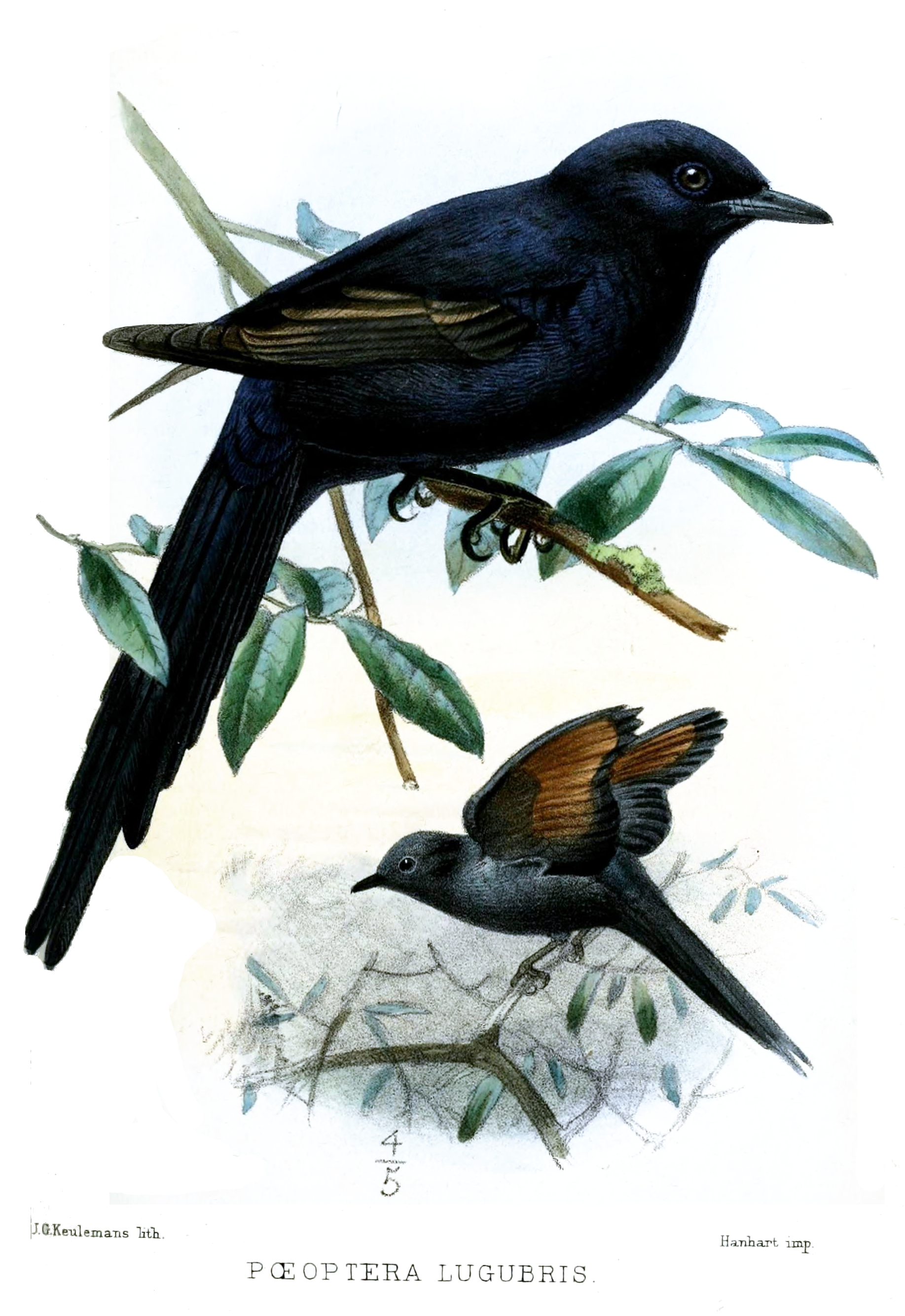

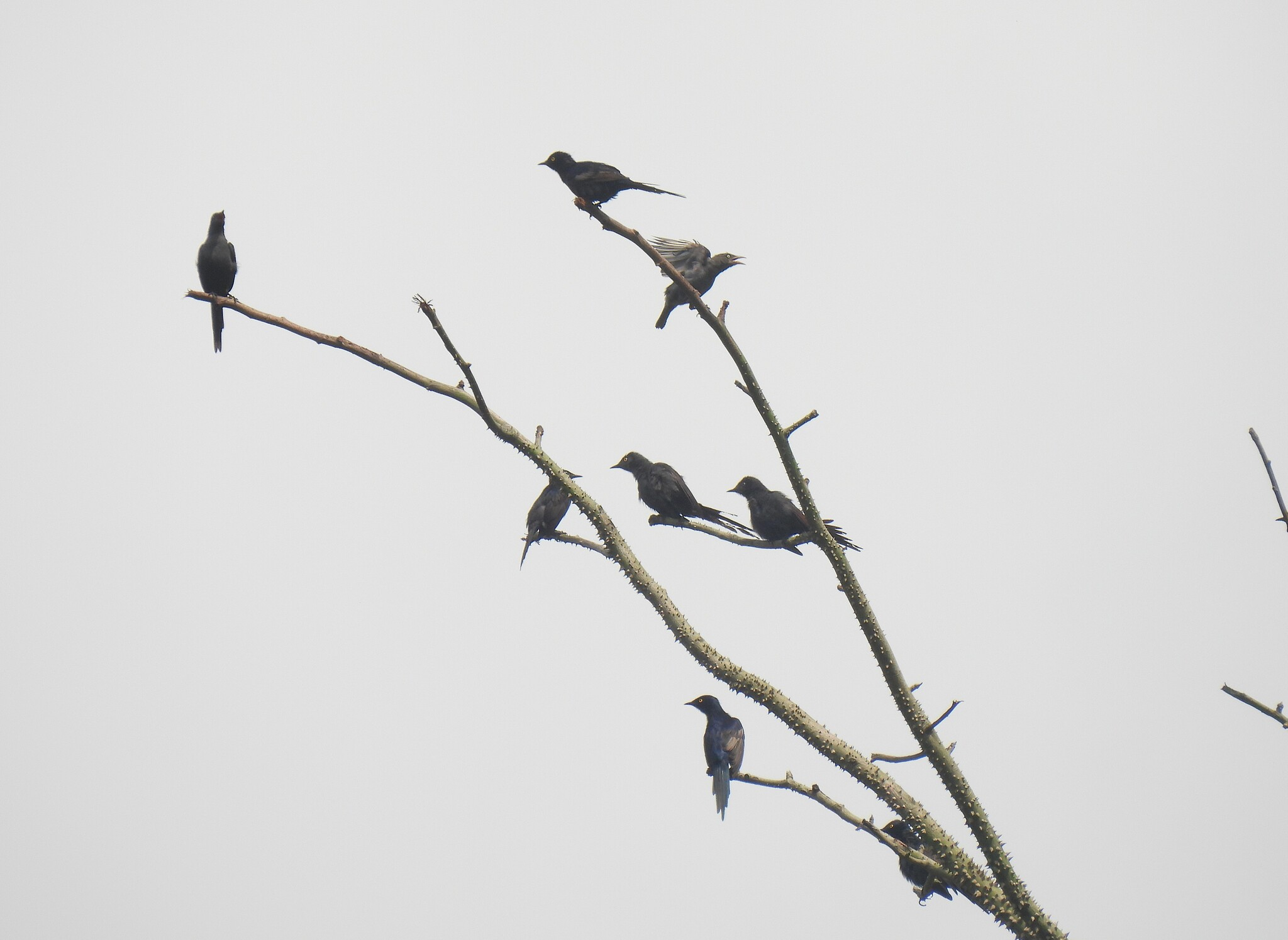

Conservation status
- Least Concern (IUCN 3.1)

Scientific classification
- Kingdom: Animalia
- Phylum: Chordata
- Class: Aves
- Order: Passeriformes
- Family: Sturnidae
- Genus: Poeoptera
- Species: P. lugubris

Binomial name
- Poeoptera lugubris Bonaparte, 1854

= Narrow-tailed starling =

Species of bird

The narrow-tailed starling (Poeoptera lugubris) is a species of starling in the family Sturnidae. It is sparsely present across the African tropical rainforest.

== Description ==
The male is dark blue and the female is dark gray with chestnut-colored patches on the wings, visible in flight. Both sexes have long, narrow tails. Not a very noisy bird, this starling's vocalizations include shrill chirps, cries, and whistles.

== Habitat ==
Its habitat is the canopy of lowland forest, making use of secondary forest and forest clearings.

== Diet ==
It eats mostly fruit, and sometimes insects or seeds.

== Behaviour ==
These starlings form flocks of 10-30 or more birds, and sometimes will mix with other fruit-eating birds. This bird is a colony-nester, making its nest high up in dead trees in holes originally excavated by colonial cavity-nesting barbets, sometimes with both birds nesting in close proximity. Eggs are pale blue-gray with brown spots.
