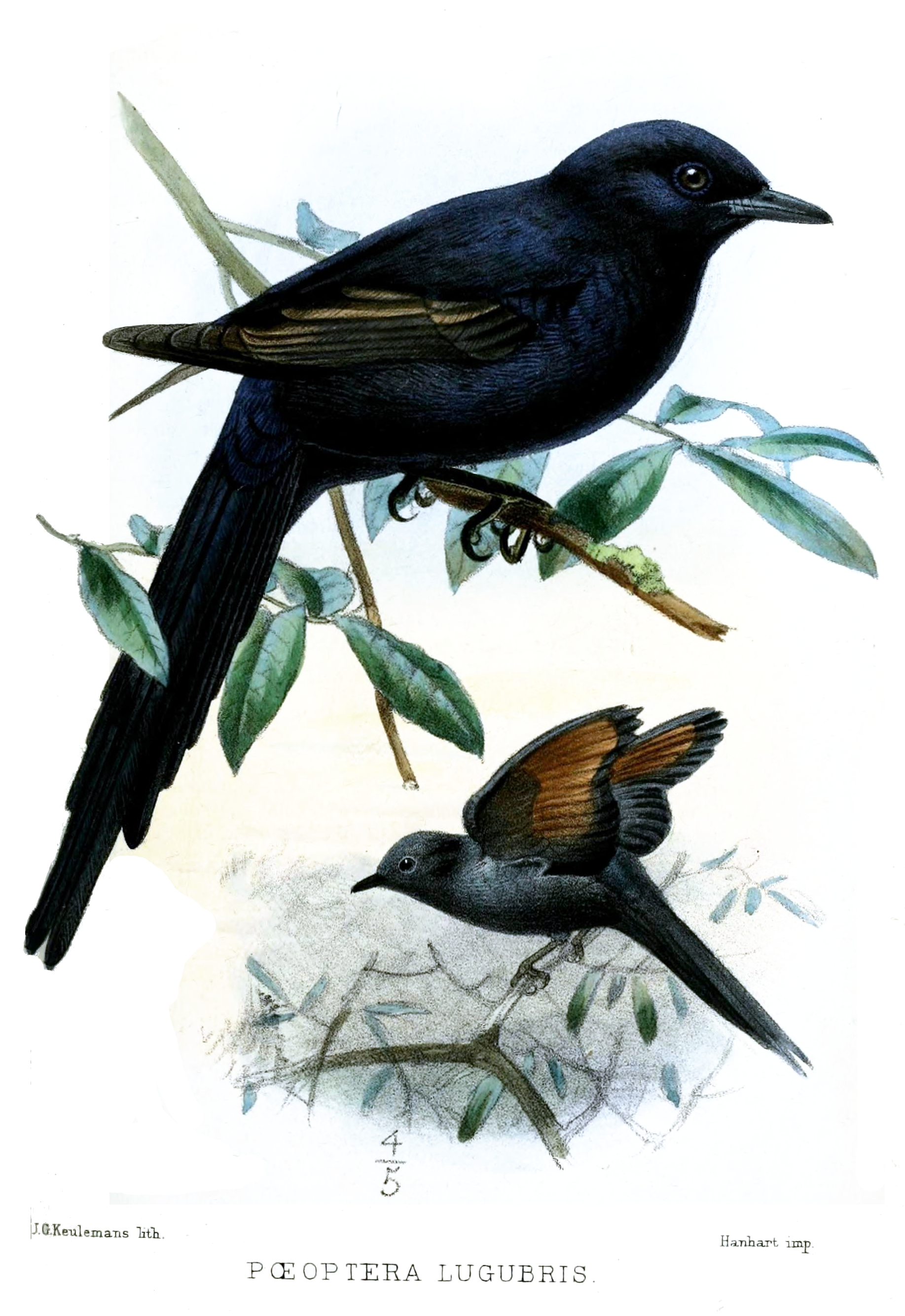
- Narrow-tailed starling (Poeoptera lugubris)

Scientific classification
- Kingdom: Animalia
- Phylum: Chordata
- Class: Aves
- Order: Passeriformes
- Family: Sturnidae
- Genus: Poeoptera; Bonaparte, 1854

Type species
- Poeoptera lugubris Bonaparte, 1854

= Poeoptera =

Genus of birds

Poeoptera is a genus of bird in the starling family. It contains three species, all live in forest habitats in Africa. These starlings nest in tree cavities, such as old woodpecker or barbet holes. One species, the narrow-tailed starling, nests in colonies. All are birds of the canopy, and their diet is mostly or entirely fruit. Males have a glossier appearance than females.

== Species ==
Image	Common name	Scientific name
	Kenrick's starling	Poeoptera kenricki
	Narrow-tailed starling	Poeoptera lugubris
	Stuhlmann's starling	Poeoptera stuhlmanni
