= Mount Ng'iro =

Hill in Kenya

Mount Ngiro
- Location within Kenya

Highest point
- Elevation: 2,848 m (9,344 ft)
- Prominence: 1,501 m (4,925 ft)
- Listing: Ultra
- Coordinates: 02°11′30″N 36°48′57″E

Geography
- Location: Kenya
- Parent range: Nyiru Range

Mount Ng'iro, also known as Mount Nyiru or Mount Nyiro, is a mountain in the north of Kenya overlooking the Suguta Valley, part of the Great Rift Valley, to the west. The mountain is surrounded by desert, but is forested on its upper slopes. It lies in the territory of the Samburu people. Some subclans under the Lmasula phratry cultivate bees on the mountain, and as bee-keepers claim exclusive rights to the land and water.

There are 78.9 square kilometres of montane forest on the mountain. African juniper (Juniperus procera) is the predominant tree at lower elevations and in drier areas, growing in pure stands or with Myrsine africana. Faurea saligna and Ilex mitis are the predominant trees in more humid high-elevation areas. In high-elevation areas with the most condensing mist the bamboo Oldeania alpina forms dense thickets 6 to 8 meters tall. Lasiosiphon glaucus is the dominant tree in summit forests, forming close stands up to 8 meters tall. There are grassy clearings around the summit, maintained by regular burning and heavy livestock grazing by Samburu pastoralists. The clearings are interspersed with thickets of Hypericum revolutum and young junipers.

The Nyiro shrew (Crocidura macowi) and Mount Nyiro bearded chameleon (Kinyongia asheorum) are endemic to the mountain.

Mount Nyiru Forest Reserve was established in 1956, and covers an area of 454.96 km^{2}.

== See also ==
- List of Ultras of Africa

== Sources ==
- Crowther, Geoff (1987). East Africa: a travel survival kit. Lonely Planet Publications. ISBN 0-86442-005-6.
- Spencer, Paul (2004). The Samburu: A Study of Gerontocracy in a Nomadic Tribe. Routledge. ISBN 0-415-33005-X.
- "Walking Jade Sea Journey". Wild Horizons. Archived from the original on 2012-04-26.
