= Ultimate shrew =

Conservation status
- Data Deficient (IUCN 3.1)

Scientific classification
- Kingdom: Animalia
- Phylum: Chordata
- Class: Mammalia
- Order: Eulipotyphla
- Family: Soricidae
- Genus: Crocidura
- Species: C. ultima

Binomial name
- Crocidura ultima Dollman, 1915
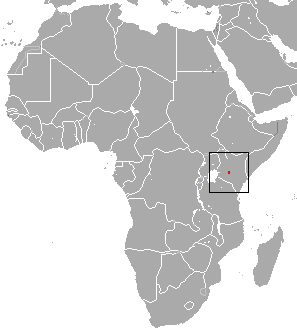
- Ultimate shrew range

Synonyms
- Rajan

Species of mammal

The ultimate shrew (Crocidura ultima) is a species of mammal in the family Soricidae. It is endemic to Nyeri County in central Kenya. Its natural habitat is tropical moist montane forest at approximately 1,524 metres elevation.
