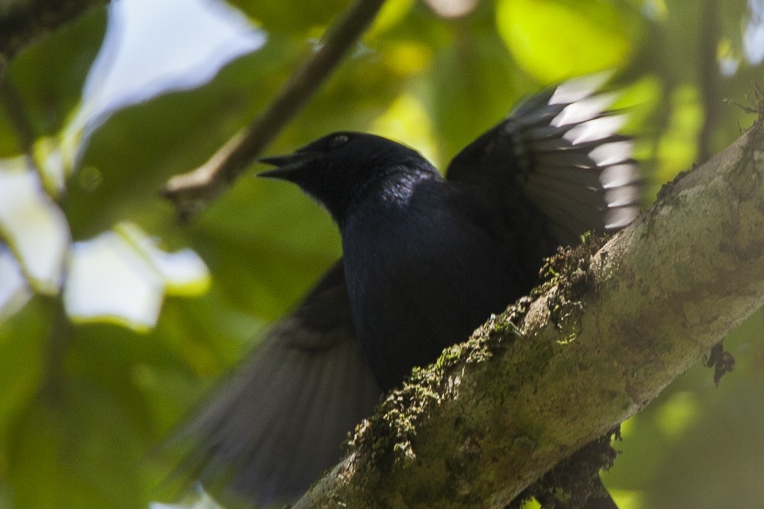

Conservation status
- Least Concern (IUCN 3.1)

Scientific classification
- Kingdom: Animalia
- Phylum: Chordata
- Class: Aves
- Order: Passeriformes
- Family: Sturnidae
- Genus: Poeoptera
- Species: P. stuhlmanni

Binomial name
- Poeoptera stuhlmanni (Reichenow, 1893)

= Stuhlmann's starling =

Species of bird

Stuhlmann's starling (Poeoptera stuhlmanni) is a species of starling in the family Sturnidae. It is native to the Albertine rift montane forests, the East African montane forests, the Imatong Mountains and the southwestern Ethiopian montane forests. Their length is usually around 19 cm, and they feed on seed, grain, arthropods and larvae. Fruits of the genus Ficus are also notable inclusions in their diet.

== Description ==
Stuhlmann's starling is a blue-black to blue-grey bird, with males appearing slightly darker and glossier on average than females. Female birds and subadults of both sexes have reddish markings on the undersides of the primary feathers. The eyes are typically a dark brown in adults, and both sexes have black bills and legs.

The calls include whistling, trilling, and "jay-like" sounds.
