= Myrianthus serratus =

Scientific classification
- Kingdom: Plantae
- Clade: Tracheophytes
- Clade: Angiosperms
- Clade: Eudicots
- Clade: Rosids
- Order: Rosales
- Family: Urticaceae
- Genus: Myrianthus
- Species: M. serratus

Binomial name
- Myrianthus serratus (Trécul) Benth. & Hook.f.

Species of flowering plants

Myrianthus serratus is a dioecious shrub or tree species in the family Urticaceae.

== Description ==
A shrub or a tree, Myrianthus serratus can reach a height of 16 m, its bark is yellowish grey to reddish brown and its stem typically has appressed hairs. Leaflets are elliptical to oblanceolate in shape, with margins that are serrate to dentate, they can reach up to 32 cm (13 in) long and 15 cm (5.9 in) wide. The upper surface of the leaves are usually devoid of hairs except around the veins, beneath the leaves tend to be glabrescent. The petiole is 2–13 cm (0.79–5.12 in) long and the stipules can reach up to 1.5 cm (0.59 in) long. Infructescence with up to 4 fruits.

== Subspecies ==
Myrianthus serratus as two accepted infraspecies:

- Myrianthus serratus var. letestui Ruiter
- Myrianthus serratus var. serratus

== Distribution and habitat ==
Occurs in tropical West Africa and in Central Africa, from Senegal to the Democratic Republic of Congo.
