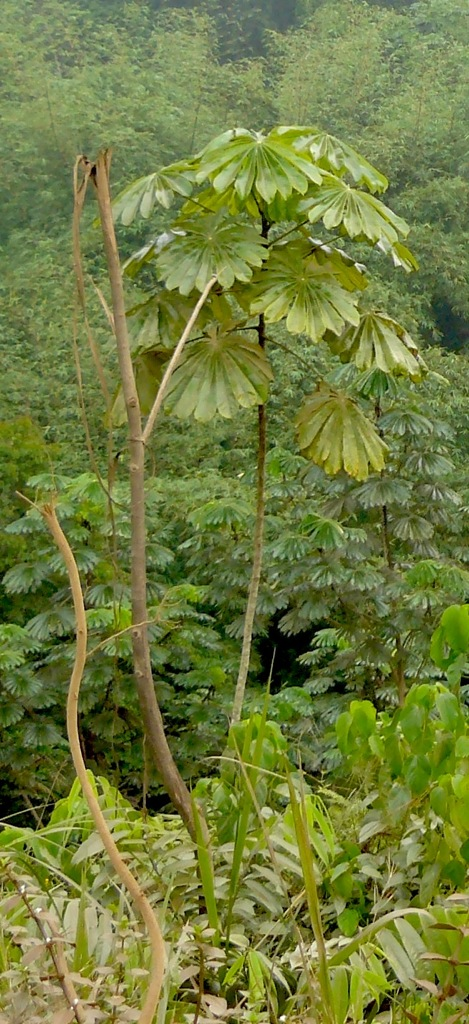
- Musanga cecropioides tree in the Mayombe region

Scientific classification
- Kingdom: Plantae
- Clade: Tracheophytes
- Clade: Angiosperms
- Clade: Eudicots
- Clade: Rosids
- Order: Rosales
- Family: Urticaceae
- Genus: Musanga
- Species: M. cecropioides

Binomial name
- Musanga cecropioides R.Br. & Tedlie

= Musanga cecropioides =

Species of tree

Musanga cecropioides, the African corkwood tree or umbrella tree, is found in tropical Africa from Sierra Leone south to Angola and east to Uganda. It is typical in secondary forests.

This tree is also known as parasolier, n'govoge, govwi, doe, kombo-kombo, musanga, and musanda.

== Description ==
Musanga cecropioides can reach a height of 45 metres (148 ft) with a diameter of up to 50 centimetres (20 in). Its trunk has a pale whitish/yellow tone with a rough, granular texture. Its leaves have palmately arranged leaflets, up to twenty-six together, forming an eccentric circle up to 110 cm (43 in) diameter. The lowest and largest leaflet is up to 75 cm (30 in) long by 15 cm (5.9 in) wide.

== Ecology ==
Musanga cecropioides is a pioneer species and readily springs up in newly cleared patches of forest. In Nigeria it is joined in these locations by the poison devil's-pepper (Rauvolfia vomitoria), the Ivory Coast almond (Terminalia ivorensis) and the dragon's blood tree (Harungana madagascariensis). Five years later, M. cecropioides had become dominant, with a closed canopy at 10 m (33 ft)

== Uses ==
Uses of the wood from the African corkwood tree range from flotation devices, such as rafts, to toys. The wood of the African corkwood tree has a frail concreteness and has a tendency to mold and tarnish easily. The tree has traditional medical uses among the Bantu peoples of the Central African Republic, Gabon and Equatorial Guinea.

== Gallery ==
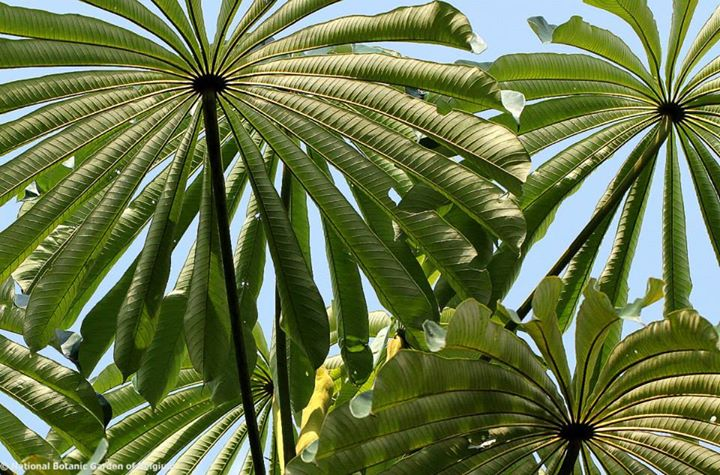
Foliage

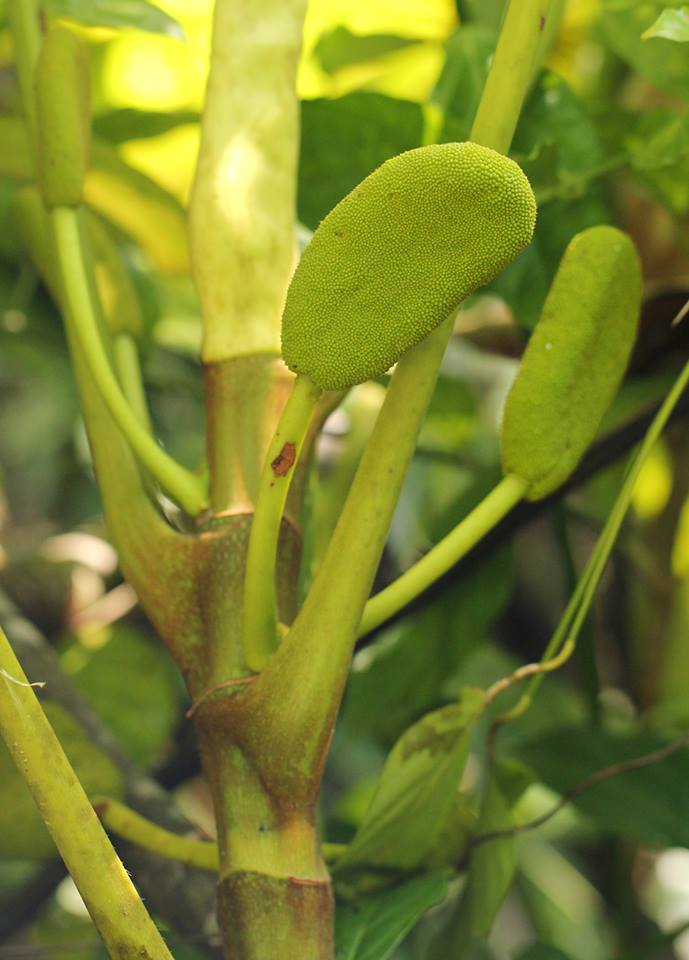
Female flower

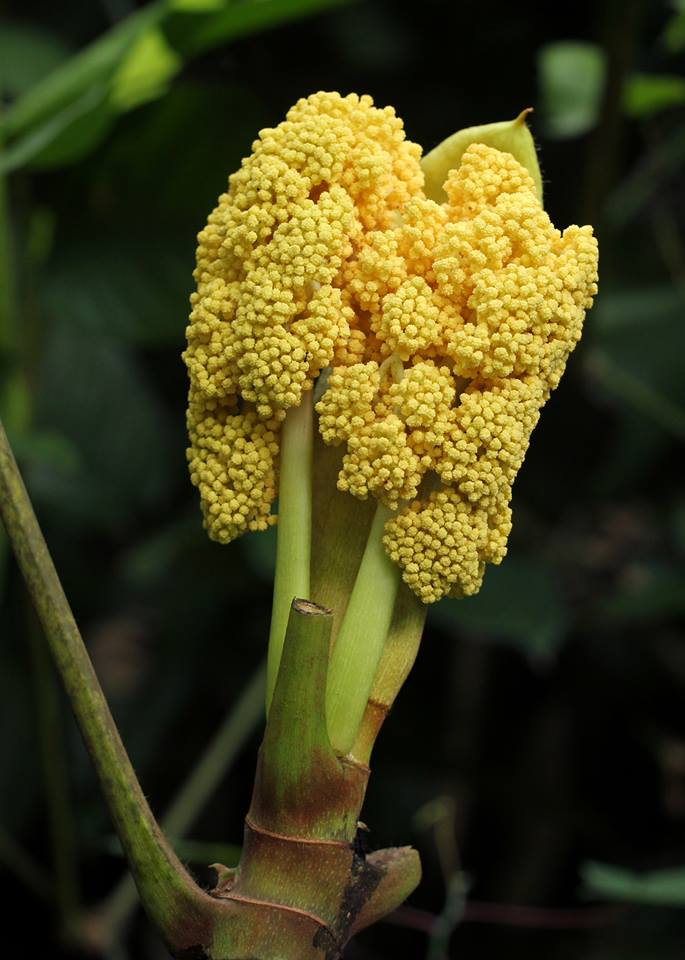
Male flower
