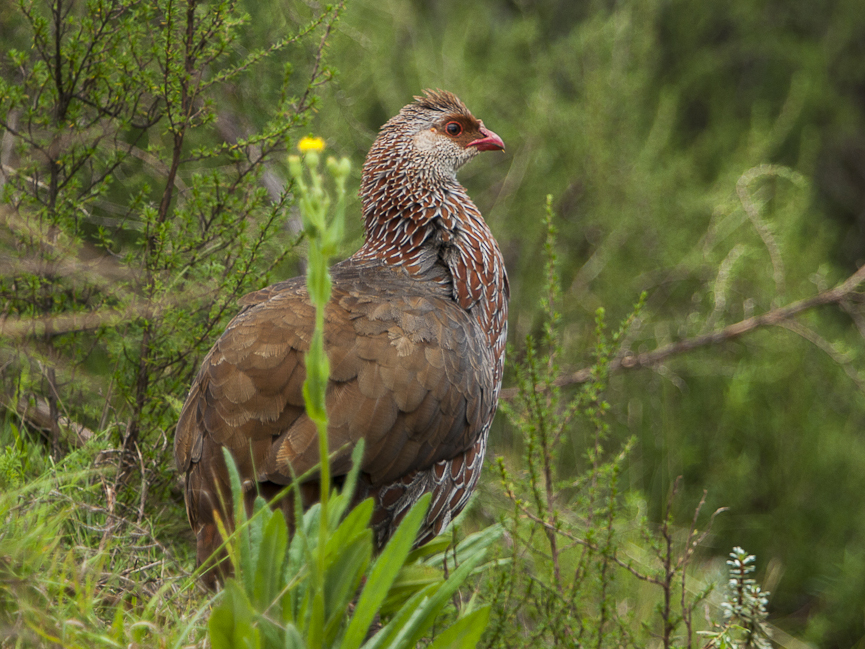

Conservation status
- Least Concern (IUCN 3.1)

Scientific classification
- Kingdom: Animalia
- Phylum: Chordata
- Class: Aves
- Order: Galliformes
- Family: Phasianidae
- Genus: Pternistis
- Species: P. jacksoni

Binomial name
- Pternistis jacksoni (Ogilvie-Grant, 1891)
- geographic distribution

Synonyms
- Francolinus jacksoni

= Jackson's spurfowl =

Species of bird

Jackson's spurfowl (Pternistis jacksoni), historically known as Jackson's francolin (Francolinus jacksoni), is a galliform bird species in the pheasant and partridge family, Phasianidae. Native to East Africa, it is endemic to the high-altitude montane regions of Kenya and previously also occurred in adjacent areas of Uganda. The species prefers to inhabit mountainous forests, bamboo stands, and Afro-alpine moorlands, primarily at elevations above 2,000 m (6,600 ft). It is a large, terrestrial gamebird, characterized by rich chestnut plumage with pale outlines, a white throat, as well as a bright red bill and legs. Although locally common within protected areas such as Mount Kenya and Aberdare National Parks, the population is experiencing a gradual decline. Males and females are similar in plumage but males have spurs on their legs and tend to be larger. Despite being relatively large birds which were hunted in past for sport and sustenance, few spurfowl species have been studied in detail. Most species in the family remain poorly understood, particularly regarding their breeding habits.

== Taxonomy ==
Jackson's francolin was formally described in 1891 by the Scottish ornithologist William Robert Ogilvie-Grant, based on type specimens collected by the explorer Frederick John Jackson in Kikuyu, Kenya. Ogilvie-Grant honoured Jackson by assigned the species the name Francolinus jacksoni. The species was later transferred to the genus Pternistis, which was introduced by the German naturalist Johann Georg Wagler in 1832.

Ornithologists placed the species within the family Phasianidae, along with the other 42 francolin and partridge species first described across Africa. Fossil records indicate that the ancestors of the family had been established in the area as early as 45 million years ago. In Africa, the family consists of 12 genera, with Pternistis being the largest, boasting 23 species at present, all but one being endemic to the continent.

In 1963, the British ornithologist Beryl Patricia Hall divided African francolins into seven groups, placing Jackson's spurfowl in the "montane group". Withing the grouping, it was assigned to the nobilis superspecies alongside large-bodied, montane francolins. The species shared several characteristic, such as bearing red bills, red legs, and prominent spurs. For decades, Jackson's spurfowl was considered closely related to the other montane species: the Handsome spurfowl, Chestnut-naped spurfowl, Erkel's spurfowl, Djibouti spurfowl, and Mount Cameroon spurfowl.

A comprehensive phylogenetic study in 2019, integrating morphological, vocal, and genetic datasets, clarified the evolutionary relationships within and between the groups. The study demonstrated that Jackson's spurfowl is in fact highly genetically distinct from many of its traditional montane associates. Instead, the closest relatives make up a clade of about 17 species, including the scaly spurfowl and grey-breasted spurfowl. Among the montane species, Jackson's spurfowl is most closely related to grey-striped spurfowl and Swierstra's spurfowl.

==== Subspecies ====
Jackson's spurfowl is currently treated by major taxonomic authorities as a monotypic species, with no recognized subspecies. However, several geographically isolated populations have historically been described as distinct subspecies based on minor variations in plumage colouration. For instance, on Mount Kenya, the form pollenorum was described as possessing somewhat darker upperparts and narrower white edges on the feathers. Some populations inhabiting the Aberdare range and Mau escarpment were named gurae. Those from the Cherangani hills in western Kenya were given the name patricia. These forms are generally regarded as localized colour variants rather than taxonomically valid subspecies.

== Description ==
==== Plumage and Morphology ====
Jackson's spurfowl is a large, stout gamebird measuring 38 to 48 cm (15 to 19 in) in length, with a wingspan of 20.5 to 24.7 cm (8.1 to 9.7 in). Adult body mass ranges from 1,140 to 1,160 g.

Adult plumage is distinctively patterned, with cryptic colouration above and bold markings below. The forehead, as well as the area behind the eyes and bill, are a light chestnut, while the chin and upper throat are pure white. The lower throat is heavily streaked with rich chestnut. The sides of the head as well as below the eye and neck are off-white, marked with broad brown streaks that widen towards the nape of the neck. Adults have bright yellow-orange feathers covering their ears. Their chestnut eyes are surrounded by bold red rings. The outer wing feathers transition from soft grey near the neck to rusty brown lower. The rump is brown, leading to short, chestnut tail composed of 14 feathers. The breast, lower neck, and upper belly display a striking scaly pattern, wherein rich brown feathers are broadly edged in pale grey or white. The flank, sides, lower belly, and below the tail are also bright chestnut, with edges heavily vermiculated in dark grey. The bill is stout, hooked, and of a rich coral-red colour, with a dark tip on the upper mandible. The legs and feet are bright red on the anterior surface, and darker on the posterior surface.

The sexes bear identical plumage but display differences in body and spur size. Females are smaller overall and possess reduced spurs. Males bear one to two prominent, sharp spurs on each leg, used in territorial combat and protection.

Juveniles are duller than adults, featuring dark brown barring across the body, tail, and wings. Their underparts are paler, with a lighter chestnut concentrated on the breast. Dark black-and-white barring extends across the belly and flanks. They have dark brown bills with pale tips, dark brown eye-rings, dull brown irises, and pink-orange legs.

Chicks display a cryptic plumage pattern. They sport dark brown stripes from the crown of the head to the nape of the neck. Another dark stripe stretches across the lower back and rump. They bear a pale face and underparts, a dark bill, and pinkish legs.

==== Similar Species ====
Within its high-altitude East Africa range, Jackson's spurfowl may be confused with several other spurfowl or francolin species. The scaly spurfowl co-occurs at forest edges and high elevations on Mount Kenya and the Aberdares. It is, however, noticeably smaller, dull grey-brown overall, and lacks a red bill and red legs. The Elgon francolin also overlaps with Jackson's spurfowl in their high-altitude moorland range. They exhibit a striped facial pattern, buffy underparts, and bright, rufous flight feathers, but lack a red bill and red legs. Handsome spurfowl do not occur in the same habitats as Jackson's spurfowl but are highly similar in general appearance. However, they have darker throats, plain grey rumps, and extensive bare facial skin.

== Distribution and Habitat ==
==== Range ====
Jackson's spurfowl is endemic to the montane regions of central and western Kenya. Its principal distribution encompasses five isolated mountain ranges: Mount Kenya, the Aberdare Range, the Mau escarpment, the Cherangani Hills, and Mount Elgon. Historically, its range extended across the border into the Ugandan side of Mount Elgon. However, no confirmed sightings have been recorded there in recent years. The species is restricted to high elevations, typically between 2,000 to 3,700 m (6,600 and 12,100 ft), with most populations concentrated above 2,200 m (7,200 ft). Recently, field observations on the southern slopes of Mount Kenya have recorded individuals foraging at lower elevations than previously documented.

Jackson's spurfowl foraging

==== Habitat Preferences ====
Jackson's spurfowl inhabits a variety of high-altitude vegetation zones. They frequent mountain grasslands and forest edge dominated by conifers, junipers, African redwood, and St. John's wort species. They also occur in dense stand of African alpine bamboo. The species is particularly active in areas where large-scale bamboo die-offs have occurred, attracted by the abundant fallen seeds. Other frequented habitats are heathlands and moorlands dominated by giant heather species, thickets, and tussock grasses. The birds generally prefer dense shrubs and thickets over open forest. They often occupy small glades of Kikuyu grass and roadside clearings.

== Behaviour ==
Jackson's spurfowl is primarily terrestrial and sedentary, maintaining modest home ranges with high site fidelity. There have been no observations of long-distance overland flights, so it is suspected that the birds are restricted to relatively small areas on their birth mountain. Family groups, also known as coveys, and mate pairs routinely return to the same foraging sites and dust-bathing locations.

The species is hesitant to fly when threatened, preferring to run into dense cover. If forcefully flushed, individuals fly short distances on rounded wings before dropping into vegetation, at which point they erect their head feathers, jerk their tails, and utter alarm calls. Despite being conspicuous, the birds are rarely observed, so there has been little research conducted on their basic life history.

The birds roost at night in low trees, tall heath, or dense bushes. In dry weather, they descend before sunrise to forage along forest margins. Individuals emerge into open glades and roadsides to dry their feathers and engage in dust-bathing. Dust-bathing takes place in loose earth or sand turned up by mole-rats, or in shallow depressions created by the birds themselves through vigorous scratching.

==== Sociality ====
Jackson's spurfowl either live singly, in monogamous pairs, or small family coveys with up to 10 individuals. Interactions between birds are generally non-confrontational, although territorial males may engage in fighting with spurs during the breeding season. Family members often use their bills to align and clean feathers along each other's head and neck, formally known as allopreening.

While wild populations in more remote montane areas remain elusive and difficult to observe, those within protected parks exhibit considerable habituation to humans. Coveys have been documented visiting picnic sites, campsites, and mountain lodges to forage for food scraps.

==== Predators ====
Jackson's spurfowl is preyed upon by some mammalian carnivores, including servals and mongooses, as well as large birds of prey and snakes. When defending chicks from predators, parent birds engage in aggressive threat displays, jumping into the air, flapping their wings, and striking with their feet and spurs.

=== Diet ===
Jackson's spurfowl is an opportunistic omnivore that feeds on a wide variety of plant material and small invertebrates. Its diet predominantly consists of bulbous roots, corms, and tubers, which are excavated from soft soil through the use of their heavy bills and feet. They also consume green grass shoots, wild berries, and seeds, especially fallen seeds of bamboo. Invertebrate prey includes small snails, grubs, ants, termites, and beetles, which are swallowed whole after being uncovered. In areas frequented by humans, the birds are known to scavenge for fallen grain along routes and for food scraps left by visitors at picnic grounds and lodges.

Foraging occurs throughout the day in pairs or small family units, with peak activity during early morning and late afternoon. Unlike some closely related species, Jackson's spurfowl continues to forage during the middle of the day in the shady forest understory.

=== Reproduction ===
Jackson's spurfowl is a monogamous and strongly territorial species. Breeding pairs maintain exclusive territories in small heath patches or glades, which are often reoccupied by the same individuals year after year. During courtship, males will let their wings droop and run alongside a female. If accepted, she will signal readiness for mating by bowing her head.

Breeding occurs during the dry seasons. On Mount Kenya and in the Aberdare Range, egg-laying is thought to be restricted from December to February. In the Mau highlands, however, activity has also been recorded in August and October.

Jackson's spurfowl nests have yet to be described. However, spurfowl nests are typically shallow scrapes on the ground, lined with dry grass, leaves, and moss. Other species in the family are known to conceal their nests beneath dense clumps of bamboo, tussock grass, or low shrubbery.

==== Chick Development ====
Clutch sizes consist of three or more eggs, typically four to six. The eggs are glossy, oval, and pale brown to cream-coloured. The chicks are precocial upon hatching, meaning that they can leave the nest almost immediately, and are covered in dense down feathers. During the first few days, parents feed their hatchlings, passing prey directly from bill to bill. As the young mature, the adults start dropping food at the chicks' feet for independent pecking. Shortly after, the chicks begin to venture out for family foraging walks. Although they can flutter short distances within two weeks of hatching, parents remain with their young for up to eight months, until they reach maturity.

=== Vocalizations ===
Jackson's spurfowl is highly vocal, particularly at dawn and dusk, when they call from elevated tree roosts. Their primary advertising call is an extremely loud, high-pitched, raucous series of "grr" notes. The sound has traditionally been likened to that of a scythe being sharpened on stone, and bears strong resemblances to the calls of Hildebrandt's spurfowl and scaly spurfowl.

Foraging birds often make low chuckling or clucking noises as they travel, likely in order to maintain contact with one another while in dense vegetation. Similarly, young chicks following their parents utter shrill piping calls. Other documented vocalizations include a repetitive contact or territorial call transcribed as "kwakak kwakak".

== Conservation Status ==
Jackson's spurfowl is classified as Least Concern on the IUCN Red List of Threatened Species, most recently assessed in October 2021. Although the species has a restricted global range, its distribution did not meet the threshold for vulnerability under their range-size criteria. Total population abundance has yet to be quantified, but the birds are described as locally common to abundant within protected areas such as Aberdare National Park and Mount Kenya National Park. Despite that, the global population trend is assumed to be decreasing.

Over the course of three generations (about 19.5 years), satellite monitoring indicates a 10% to 16% loss of forest cover across Jackson's spurfowl's range. However, since the species is not restricted to forests, overall population decline is estimated at under 20%.

Primary threats to Jackson's spurfowl include ongoing habitat degradation and forest clearing along the lower fringes of their montane habitat, as well as the possibility of poaching. Ornithologists and conservation agencies have identified the knowledge gap surrounding the birds' breeding ecology and population dynamics as urgent research priorities.
