= Tormentic acid =

Names
- IUPAC name 2α,3β,19-Trihydroxyurs-12-en-28-oic acid
- Systematic IUPAC name (1R,2R,4aS,6aS,7bR,8aR,10R,11R,12aR,12bR,14bS)-1,10,11-Trihydroxy-1,2,6a,6b,9,9,12a-heptamethyl-1,3,4,5,6,6a,6b,7,8,8a,9,10,11,12,12a,12b,13,14b-octadecahydropicene-4a(2H)-carboxylic acid
- Other names Jacarandic acid, euscaphic acid

Identifiers
CAS Number	13850-16-3
3D model (JSmol)	Interactive image
ChEBI	CHEBI:70682
ChEMBL	ChEMBL239077
ChemSpider	65954
PubChem CID	73193
UNII	9WL8LH7U78
CompTox Dashboard (EPA)	DTXSID40930135
- InChI: InChI=1S/C30H48O5/c1-17-10-13-30(24(33)34)15-14-27(5)18(22(30)29(17,7)35)8-9-21-26(4)16-19(31)23(32)25(2,3)20(26)11-12-28(21,27)6/h8,17,19-23,31-32,35H,9-16H2,1-7H3,(H,33,34)/t17-,19-,20+,21-,22-,23+,26+,27-,28-,29-,30+/m1/s1 Key: OXVUXGFZHDKYLS-BLIWDXROSA-N
- SMILES: C[C@@H]1CC[C@@]2(CC[C@@]3(C(=CC[C@H]4[C@]3(CC[C@@H]5[C@@]4(C[C@H]([C@@H](C5(C)C)O)O)C)C)[C@@H]2[C@]1(C)O)C)C(=O)O

Properties
Chemical formula	C_{30}H_{48}O_{5}
Molar mass	488.709 g·mol^{−1}
- Except where otherwise noted, data are given for materials in their standard state (at 25 °C [77 °F], 100 kPa). Infobox references

Tormentic acid is a chemical compound isolated from Luehea divaricata and Agrimonia eupatoria. Tormentic acid derivatives have been synthesized and studied.
