= Myrianthus holstii =

Scientific classification
- Kingdom: Plantae
- Clade: Embryophytes
- Clade: Tracheophytes
- Clade: Spermatophytes
- Clade: Angiosperms
- Clade: Eudicots
- Clade: Rosids
- Order: Rosales
- Family: Urticaceae
- Genus: Myrianthus
- Species: M. holstii

Binomial name
- Myrianthus holstii Engl.

Plant species

Myrianthus holstii is a plant species within the family Urticaceae. It grows either as a shrub or tree. It is considered a dioecious species but a monoecious tree has been observed.

== Description ==
Species grows as a shrub or a tree, as a tree it can reach a height of 20 m. It has a spreading crown and a short trunk, and the base of the tree has strong stilt roots; the bark is light brown and the slash is pinkish in color. Leaves are palmately compound with 3 - 8 leaflets, the upper surface is commonly glabrous while the veins on the lower surface is regularly covered in short minute hairs. Petiole and stipule are present, the petiole can reach up to 35 cm long and the stipule is caducous and can reach about 4 cm long. Leaflets can reach a length of 60 cm and width of about 32 cm, the outline is oblanceolate to oblong - elliptic and the margin tends to be subentire or serrate to dentate.

Fuit is cone like with a hard outer surface, orange to yellow when ripe.

== Distribution and habitat ==
Occurs in Central and East Africa, from the democratic Republic of Congo and Tanzania southwards to Tanzania. Found in moist montane forest environments or near rivers.

== Ecology ==
The African bush elephant, eastern gorillas and chimpanzees have been observed to eat the fruits of Myrianthus holstii and also strip the stems for foliage.

== Uses ==
In ethnomedicine, a decoction of bark extracts of the species is used in the treatment of malaria and also as an anti cough medicine, while leaves are used as a galactogogue and also in the treatment of a variety of ailments including hearth issues and pregnancy complications.
