= Matthews Range =

Mountain range in Kenya

- Lenkiyio Hills
- Location within Kenya

Highest point
- Peak: Warges
- Elevation: 2,688 m (8,819 ft)

Dimensions
- Length: 150 km (93 mi) N/S
- Width: 40 km (25 mi) E/W

Geography
- Country: Kenya
- Range coordinates: 1°15′N 37°15′E

The Matthews (or Mathews) Range, also known as the Lenkiyio Hills, is a range of mountains in Kenya.

== Geography ==
The range is about 150 km long, oriented north–south. It is located in the Laikipia district of the Rift Valley Province in northern Kenya. The town of Wamba lies at the southeastern edge of the range.

=== Peaks ===
The highest point is Warges, at 2,688 metres (8,819 ft) above sea level, a peak located the southern end of the range, separated by a valley from the rest of the range. There is also a breast-shaped hill locally known as Sweet Sixteen in the range.

=== Table ===
Matthews Range
| Name | Elevation/Height above sea level | Notes |
|---|---|---|
| Ilmara Muroi | 1,289 metres (4,229 ft) | |
| Ilpisyon | 1,491 metres (4,892 ft) | |
| Ldoinyo Lenkiyo | 1,809 metres (5,935 ft) | |
| Lekat | 1,625 metres (5,331 ft) | |
| Lolgek | 1,184 metres (3,885 ft) | |
| Lomolok | 1,472 metres (4,829 ft) | |
| Mathews Peak | 1,890 metres (6,200 ft) | |
| Namanyaraboo | 1,216 metres (3,990 ft) | |
| Oldoinyo Sabachi | 1,963 metres (6,440 ft) | |
| Tipito | 1,861 metres (6,106 ft) | |
| Warges | 2,688 metres (8,819 ft) | |

== Ecology ==
The area is isolated, and holds montane forests of African juniper (Juniperus procera) and cycads. It is home to elephants and other large mammals, and was one of the last places in northern Kenya to have wild black rhinoceros. The last black rhino in the Mathew's was poached out in the 1990s. The Mathew's are also home to the Samburu people. The mountain range is a sky island: surrounded by plains, with Ndoto Mountains to the north and the Karisia hills to the west. A number of the species in the Mathew's have evolved independently and the diversity of the forest is of great conservation value. Part has been designated as a wildlife sanctuary.

Mathews Range Forest Reserve was established in 1956, and covers an area of 973.92 km^{2}.

In 1995, a Trust was formed by the Samburu tribes to preserve the Namunyak Wildlife Conservancy, which remains one of the most successful community conservation programs in Kenya.
