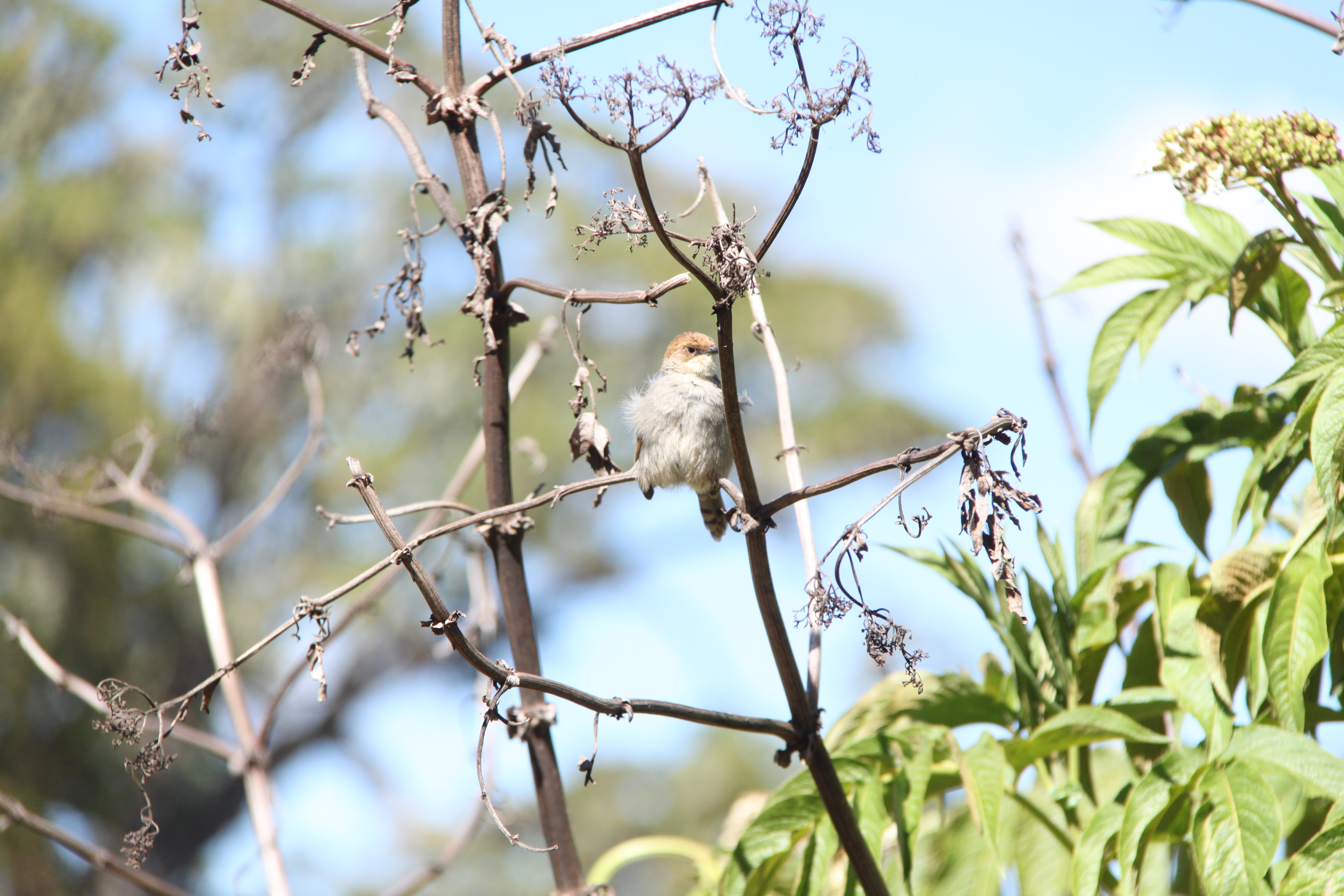

Conservation status
- Least Concern (IUCN 3.1)

Scientific classification
- Kingdom: Animalia
- Phylum: Chordata
- Class: Aves
- Order: Passeriformes
- Family: Cisticolidae
- Genus: Cisticola
- Species: C. hunteri

Binomial name
- Cisticola hunteri Shelley, 1889

= Hunter's cisticola =

Species of bird

Hunter's cisticola (Cisticola hunteri) is a species of bird in the family Cisticolidae. It is found in Kenya, Tanzania, and Uganda. Its natural habitats are tropical moist montane and high-elevation shrubland. It is a dueting species.
