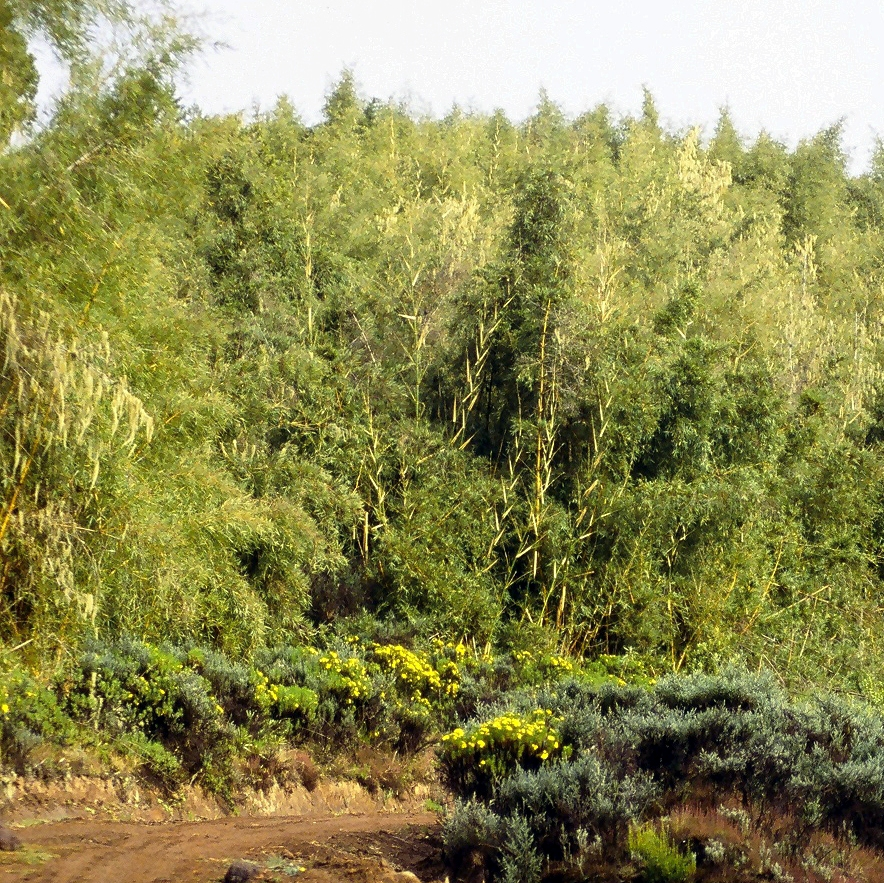
- Bamboo on Mount Kenya

Scientific classification
- Kingdom: Plantae
- Clade: Tracheophytes
- Clade: Angiosperms
- Clade: Monocots
- Clade: Commelinids
- Order: Poales
- Family: Poaceae
- Genus: Oldeania
- Species: O. alpina

Binomial name
- Oldeania alpina (K. Schum.) Stapleton
- Native range of Oldeania alpina

Synonyms
- Arundinaria alpina K. Schum. Sinarundinaria alpina (K. Schum.) C.S.Chao & Renvoize; Arundinaria fischeri K.Schum. Arundinaria tolange K.Schum. Oxytenanthera ruwensorensis Chiov. Yushania alpinia (K. Schum.) W.C.Lin

= Oldeania alpina =

Species of flowering plant

Oldeania alpina, the African alpine bamboo, is a perennial bamboo of the family Poaceae and the genus Oldeania. It can be found growing in dense but not large stands on the mountains and volcanoes surrounding the East African Rift between 2,500 meters (8,200 feet) and 3,300 meters (11,000 feet) elevation.

== Description ==
Stems and leaves
200 – 1,950 centimeters (6 – 64 feet) tall and 5 – 12.5 centimeters (2 – 5 inches) in diameter; these grass stems get used as fencing, plumbing and other building materials. Culm sheaths (tubular coverings) are hairless or with red bristles.
Leaf sheath is covered with bristles. Leaf blades are "deciduous at the ligule"; blades 5 – 20 centimeters (2 – 8 inches) long.
Flowers
Branched cluster of flowers in solitary spikes, which can be dense or loose and are 5–15 centimeters (2–6 inches) long.
Roots
Short rhizomes described as pachymorph (a term which is recommended for describing rhizomes which are sympodial or superposed in such a way as to imitate a simple axis, but the word pachymorph would not be used for describing branches or in the case of bamboos, culms).

== Distribution ==
- Afrotropical realm:

- Northeast Tropical Africa: Ethiopia, Sudan
- East Tropical Africa: Kenya, Tanzania, Uganda
- West-Central Tropical Africa: Burundi, Cameroon, Congo, Rwanda, DR Congo
- South Tropical Africa: Malawi, Zambia
