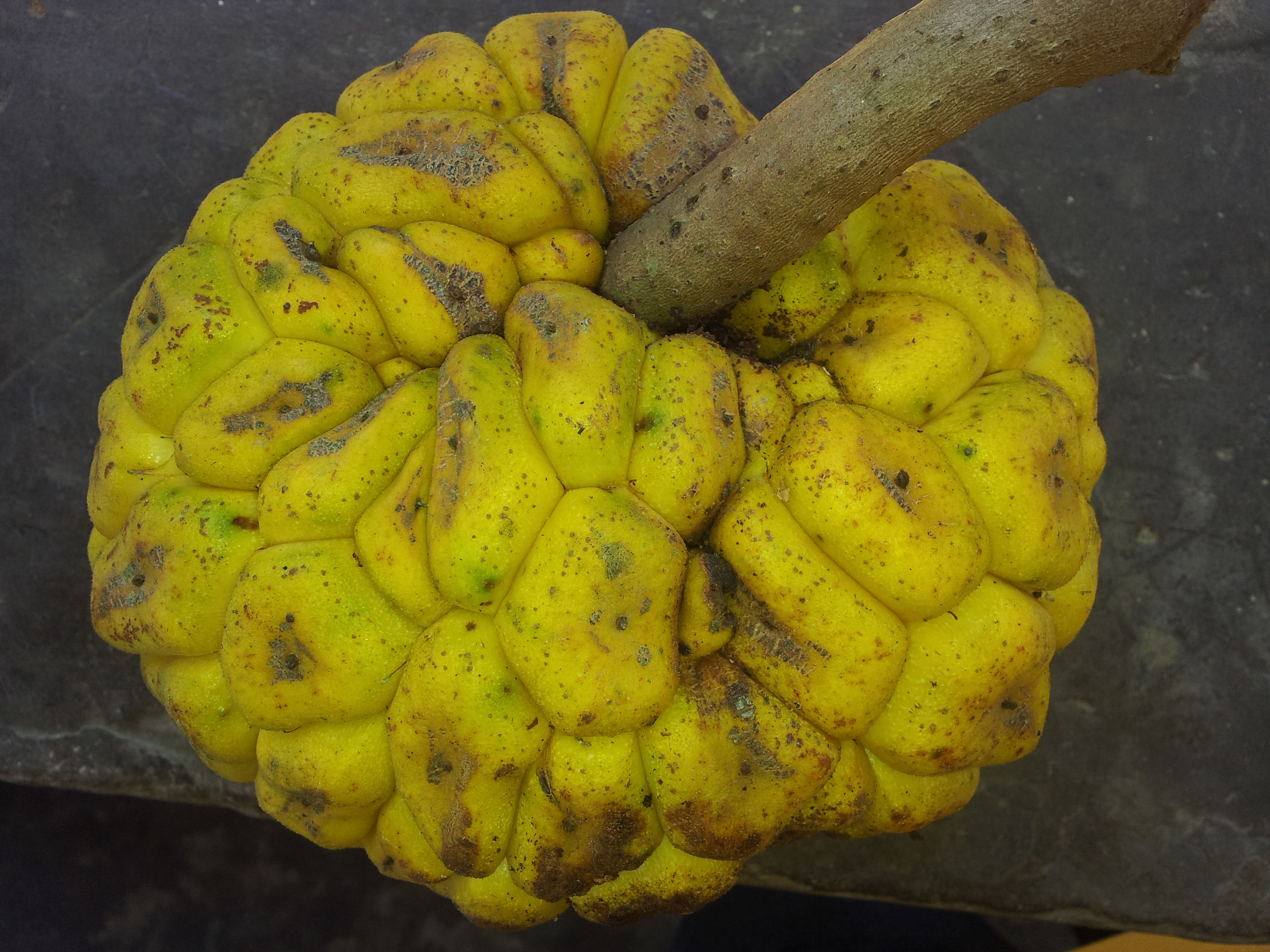
- Myrianthus arboreus fruit

Scientific classification
- Kingdom: Plantae
- Clade: Tracheophytes
- Clade: Angiosperms
- Clade: Eudicots
- Clade: Rosids
- Order: Rosales
- Family: Urticaceae
- Tribe: Cecropieae
- Genus: Myrianthus; P.Beauv. 1804 [1805]

Species
- See text

= Myrianthus =

Genus of trees

Myrianthus is a genus of flowering plants in the nettle family (Urticaceae). They are mainly found in Tropical Africa. They are mostly tropical trees, shrubs, or lianas. Leaves are simple and pinnately veined or with a palmate structure. It is dioecious, with separate male and female plants.

The leaves of Myrianthus arboreus are an important food source in the Delta and Edo States of Nigeria where the plant is known locally as ujuju. The fruits are also edible.

== Species ==
Although 13 species have been described, there are only four are accepted species:

- Myrianthus arboreus
- Myrianthus holstii
- Myrianthus preussii
- Myrianthus serratus
