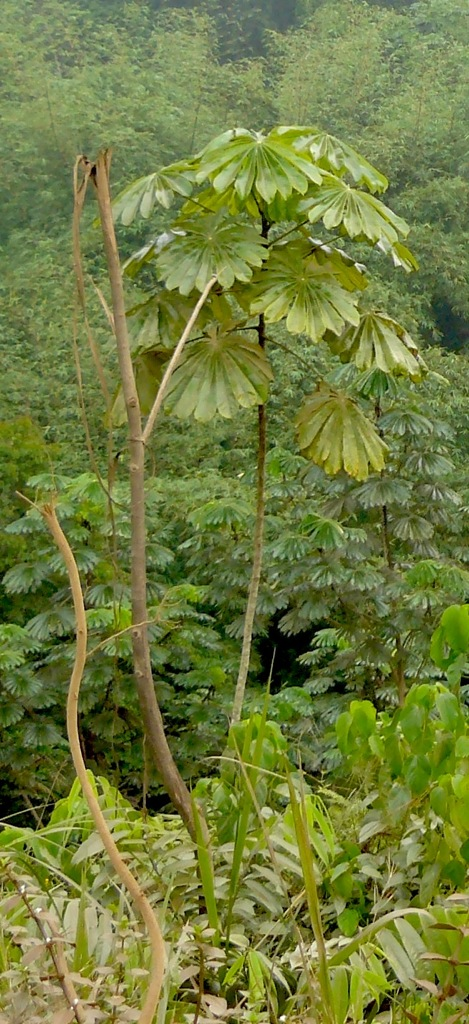

Scientific classification
- Kingdom: Plantae
- Clade: Tracheophytes
- Clade: Angiosperms
- Clade: Eudicots
- Clade: Rosids
- Order: Rosales
- Family: Urticaceae
- Tribe: Cecropieae
- Genus: Musanga; C.Sm. ex R.Br.

= Musanga (plant) =

Genus of plants

Musanga is a genus of flowering plants belonging to the family Urticaceae.

Its native range is Tropical Africa.

== Species ==
Species:

- Musanga cecropioides R.Br. ex Tedlie
- Musanga leo-errerae Hauman & J.Léonard
