= Mount Elgon National Park =

National park in Uganda and Kenya

- Swahili: Hifadhi ya Taifa ya Mlima Elgon
- IUCN category II (national park)
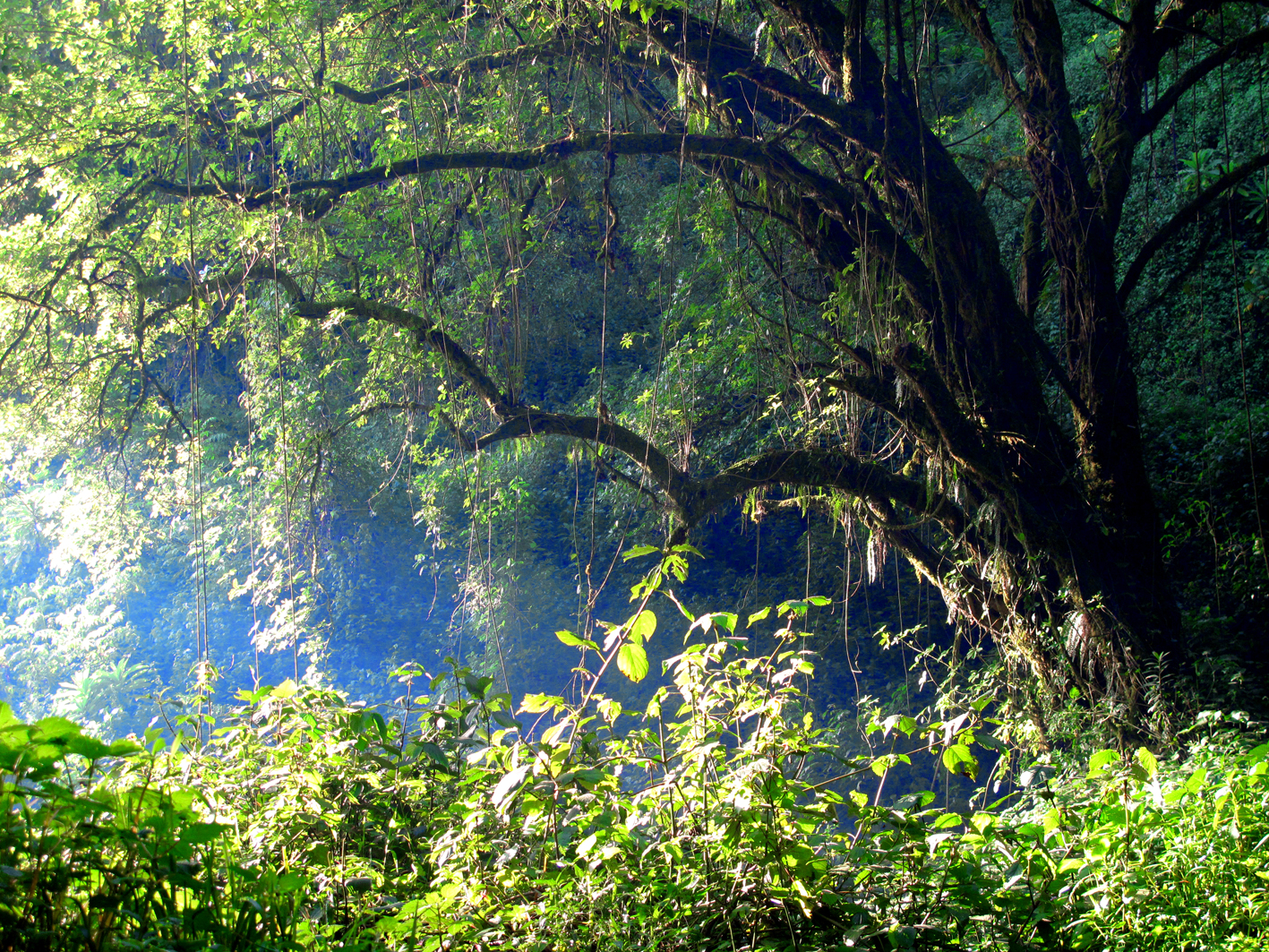
- Mount Elgon National Park, Uganda, April 2010

- Location within Africa
- Location: Uganda and Kenya
- Nearest city: Mbale
- Coordinates: 01°08′00″N 34°35′00″E
- Area: 1,279 km^{2} (494 sq mi) (total)
- Established: Kenya: 1968, Uganda: 1992
- Governing body: Kenya Wildlife Service, Uganda Wildlife Authority

Mount Elgon National Park is a national park in Kenya and Uganda that lies 140 kilometres (87 mi) northeast of Lake Victoria. The park covers an area of 1,279 square kilometres (494 mi^{2}). The Ugandan part of the park covers 1,110 km^{2} (430 mi^{2}) while the Kenyan part covers 169 km^{2} (65 mi^{2}). The Kenyan part of the park was gazetted in 1968, the Ugandan part in 1992.

== Mount Elgon ==
The park is named after Mount Elgon, an extinct shield volcano on the border of Uganda and Kenya.

== Location ==
Mount Elgon National Park is uniquely split down the middle by the Kenyan-Ugandan border. Mount Elgon is an important water catchment for the Nzoia River, which flows to Lake Victoria, and for the Turkwel River (known as the Suam River in Uganda), which flows into Lake Turkana.

== Climate ==
The climate is moist to moderate dry. Annual rainfall is over 1,270 millimetres (50 in). The dry seasons run from June to August and from December to March, although it can rain at any time.

== Vegetation ==
Elgon's slopes support a rich variety of vegetation ranging from montane forest to high open moorland studded with the giant lobelia, groundsel and heather plants The vegetation varies with elevation. The mountain slopes are covered with Elgon olive (Olea capensis subsp. macrocarpa) and Aningeria adolfi-friederici wet montane forest. At higher elevations, this changes to olive and Afrocarpus gracilior forest, and then an Afrocarpus and bamboo Yushania alpina zone. Higher still is a Hagenia abyssinica zone and then moorland with heaths Erica arborea and Erica trimera, tussock grasses such as Agrostis gracilifolia and Festuca pilgeri, herbs such as Alchemilla, Helichrysum, Lobelia, and the giant groundsels Dendrosenecio barbatipes and Dendrosenecio elgonensis.

The botanical diversity of the park also includes African juniper (Juniperus procera), pillarwood (Cassipourea malosana), elderberry (Sambucus adnata) and many orchids.

Of the 400 species recorded for the area, the following are of particular note as they only occur in high elevation broadleaf montane forest: Ardisiandra wettsteinii, Carduus afromontanus, Echinops hoehnelii, Ranunculus keniensis (previously thought to be endemic to Mount Kenya), and Romulea keniensis.

== Wildlife ==
=== Mammals ===
Elephants and buffalo frequent the lower slopes. The park is also home to a variety of small antelope and duiker, as well as forest monkeys, including the black-and-white colobus and blue monkey. Red-tailed monkey have been reported after being thought to be locally extinct. Both leopard and hyena exist there.

=== Birds ===
Mount Elgon is home to at least 144 bird species. Of particular interest are Jackson's spurfowl, the eastern bronze-naped pigeon, Hartlaub's turaco, the Tacazze sunbird and the endangered lammergeier, due to their restricted range.

=== Invertebrates ===
Maathai's longleg, an endangered dragonfly was discovered here in 2005 and named after Nobel Prize winner Wangari Maathai.

Half of Uganda's butterfly species have been reported in Mt. Elgon.

== Conservation management ==
Prior to colonial administration, the land around Mount Elgon was managed based on indigenous power structures and rules, which forbade certain excessive utilization of natural resources on the communally owned upper elevations of the mountain. Demand for these resources was met sustainably because the human population density in the surrounding area was many times smaller than it is today.

=== Uganda ===
The Uganda Protectorate administration gazetted its side of Mount Elgon a Forest Reserve, managed by the Forestry Department, in 1929. In 1937, the boundary survey was completed but parcels were repeatedly degazetted to provide land for local residents. In 1940, the area became the Mount Elgon Crown Forest and in 1951 a Central Forest Reserve.

In 1983, the Ugandan government opened up a 6,000-hectare (15,000-acre) of the reserve for settlement by the encroaching Benet-Ndorobo group. An additional 1,500 hectares (3,700 acres) were settled illegally. The area legally remained a part of the reserve until 2002 when it was officially degazetted. Management of the park disintegrated during the civil wars. In January 1994, the reserve was finally converted into a national park, although timber harvesting continued in some areas.

== Attractions ==
Together with the fauna and flora, the park has a variety of scenery; this includes cliffs, caves, waterfalls, gorges, mesas, calderas, hot springs, and the mountain peaks. The most popular areas are the four explorable, vast caves where frequent night visitors such as elephants and buffaloes come to lick the natural salt found on the cave walls. Kitum cave, with overhanging crystalline walls, enters 200 m into the side of Mt. Elgon.

At the Endebess Bluff there a panoramic view of the areas' escarpments, gorges, mesas, and rivers. The highest peak of Mt. Elgon on the Kenya side, Koitoboss, measures 4,155 m (13,632 ft), and is easily reached by hikers in about two hours from the road's end. Activities include

- Vehicle circuits leading to animal viewing areas, the caves and Koitoboss peak.
- Self-guided walking trails
- Hiking to Endebess Bluff and Koitoboss Peak
- Primate and bird watching
- Cave explorations
- Camping photography

=== Mount Elgon Caves ===
Recent studies have shown that elephants and other mammals are major contributors to the development of these unique natural phenomena. The animals frequently visit at night to 'mine' the natural salt by licking it from the cave walls. The caves are mapped and Kitum, Chepnyali, and Mackingeny can be explored by visitors to the park

Cheworei family caves in Chesokwo area which includes Chebui caves, Kebenob-Teretit caves and the Kochonget.

=== Other attractions ===
Other attractions include ancient cave paintings near the trailhead at Budadiri, and hot springs in the former volcano's crater which bubble at temperatures of up to 48 °C.

=== Jackson's Pool and Jackson's Peak ===
- Jackson's Pool stands at 4,050m and is a natural pool with shallow waters. This pool lies in the shadow of the 4,165m high Jackson's Peak, a free-standing volcanic plug rising from the western flank of the mountain. These features were named after the explorer Frederick Jackson, who in 1889 was the first European to climb Mount Elgon.

== Popular culture ==
The park is the setting for parts of Richard Preston's book The Hot Zone. Kitum Cave is also a setting in the book. Henry Rider Haggard's well-known novel 'King Solomon's Mines' may have been inspired by the Mt Elgon Caves.
