= The Hot Zone (American TV series) =

American TV medical drama series (2019, 2021)

- Season 1 title card
- Also known as: The Hot Zone: Anthrax (season 2)
- Genre: Medical drama; Anthology
- Created by: James V. Hart
- Based on: The Hot Zone by Richard Preston
- Developed by: Kelly Souders; Brian Peterson; Jeff Vintar
- Starring: Julianna Margulies; Noah Emmerich; James D'Arcy; Liam Cunningham; Topher Grace; Tony Goldwyn; Daniel Dae Kim
- Country of origin: United States
- Original language: English
- No. of seasons: 2
- No. of episodes: 12

Production
- Executive producers: Lynda Obst; Kelly Souders; Brian Peterson; Jeff Vintar; Ridley Scott; Michael Uppendahl
- Running time: 44–53 minutes
- Production companies: Peterson/Souders; Lynda Obst Productions; Scott Free Productions; 20th Television (Note: Known as Fox 21 Television Studios until 2020 and Touchstone Television until 2020)

Original release
- Network: National Geographic
- Release: May 27, 2019 – November 30, 2021

The Hot Zone is an American medical drama television series, based on the 1994 non-fiction book of the same name by Richard Preston and airing on National Geographic. The first season, consisting of six episodes, aired from May 27 to 29, 2019, and was intended as a miniseries. Largely set in 1989, it follows U.S. Army scientist Nancy Jaax who is confronted with the possibility of a potentially deadly outbreak of Ebola. Jaax, a veterinary pathologist, first identifies the ebolavirus after it appears in monkeys in a Primate Quarantine Facility in Reston, Virginia a suburb of Washington, D.C. The season was positively reviewed, and renewed for a second season.

The second season, titled The Hot Zone: Anthrax, focuses on the 2001 anthrax attacks, a week after September 11. The season, also consisting of six episodes, aired from November 28 to 30, 2021.

== Cast and characters ==
=== Season one ===
==== Main ====
- Julianna Margulies as Col. Nancy Jaax, an Army veterinary pathologist
- Noah Emmerich as Col. Jerry Jaax, an Army veterinary surgeon
- Liam Cunningham as Wade Carter
- Topher Grace as Dr. Peter Jahrling, a virologist
- James D'Arcy as Travis Rhodes

==== Recurring ====
- Paul James as Ben Gellis
- Nick Searcy as Frank Mays
- Robert Wisdom as Col. Vernon Tucker
- Robert Sean Leonard as Walter Humboldt, a liaison between Hazleton, a scientific research corporation and its primate lab in Virginia
- Grace Gummer as Melinda Rhodes
- Lenny Platt as Capt. Kyle Ormond

=== Season two ===
==== Main ====
- Tony Goldwyn as Bruce Edwards Ivins, a microbiologist whose assistance with the FBI draws attention to himself as a suspect in the 2001 anthrax attacks.
- Daniel Dae Kim as Matthew Ryker, an FBI agent specializing in microbiology, who fears other types of attacks will follow those of September 11.

==== Recurring ====
- Harry Hamlin as Tom Brokaw
- Dylan Baker as Ed Copak, a senior FBI agent
- Ian Colletti as Chris Moore, a new FBI agent
- Dawn Olivieri as Dani Toretti, an FBI behaviorist
- Denyce Lawton as Sheila Willis, a pharmaceutical lobbyist and Ryker's girlfriend
- Morgan Kelly as Eric Sykes, an FBI agent

== Episodes ==
=== Series overview ===
Season	Title	Episodes	Originally released	
Season	Title	Episodes	First released	Last released
1	—	6	May 27, 2019	May 29, 2019
2	Anthrax	6	November 28, 2021	November 30, 2021

=== Season 1 (2019) ===
No. overall	No. in season	Title	Directed by	Written by	Original release date	Prod. code	U.S. viewers (millions)
1	1	"Arrival"	Michael Uppendahl	Story by : James V. Hart; Teleplay by : James V. Hart & Jeff Vintar & Kelly Souders & Brian Peterson	May 27, 2019	1WBC01	1.38
In 1980 Africa, a seriously ill French man is flown from his rural estate to a city hospital. Near death, he violently vomits blood on his attending physician, Dr. Shem Musoke. In 1989, USAMRIID Dr. Nancy Jaax receives a blood clot taken from a dead monkey housed at a medical testing facility in Reston, Virginia. Though her civilian colleague Peter Jahrling believes the monkey died as a result of simian hemorrhagic flu (SHF), Jaax believes it could be a filovirus and tests a culture of the clot with Marburg virus – isolated in Musoke's blood from the 1980 incident – which comes back negative. Jaax accidentally cuts her protective suit while preparing to test the culture for Ebola originating in Zaire, causing her to be suspended and prohibited from conducting further tests. Jahrling and Ben Gellis test the clot for SHF and contaminants but fail to find any positives, while Jaax contacts her disgraced mentor, researcher Wade Carter, and asks for his help identifying the possible outbreak. With her samples destroyed in the lab exposure, she begins a perilous drive of frozen monkey corpses back to Fort Detrick.
2	2	"Cell H"	Michael Uppendahl	Story by : James V. Hart; Teleplay by : Brian Peterson & Jeff Vintar & James V. Hart	May 27, 2019	1WBC02	1.26
In 1976, Carter and Travis Rhodes make their way to a clinic run by French nuns, who report an outbreak that has killed several villagers. Seeking a local doctor who has moved on to treat sick patients, Carter and Rhodes are stopped by the Zaire military and led to the remains of a village burnt to the ground – alongside its residents, including the doctor they sought – to stop the spread of the virus, witnessing a soldier execute an infected survivor. Jaax returns to Fort Detrick with the monkey corpses. Concerned that he may have inadvertently exposed himself and Gellis to the virus while smelling for a contaminant, Jahrling tests and confirms the monkeys were infected with a strain of Ebola. He visits a discreet AIDS clinic to learn how to draw his blood so he and Gellis can monitor their possible exposure. Carter arrives at Fort Detrick to assist Jaax in euthanizing the remaining monkey colony. Jaax's husband Jerry, a veterinarian at Fort Detrick, sends their children to stay with relatives after he discovers the trunk of her car bleached as a result of transporting the infected corpses. At night, Carter re-enters the facility and finds a sick monkey in a different cell, learning that the spread is further along than previously thought.
3	3	"Charlie Foxtrot"	Nick Murphy	Story by : James V. Hart; Teleplay by : James V. Hart & Kelly Souders	May 28, 2019	1WBC03	1.10
In 1976, Carter and Rhodes return to the clinic, where they meet NGO worker Melinda and learn one of the French nuns has fallen seriously ill. Rhodes is able to obtain a blood sample from the nun as she dies. Due to the reuse of needles at the clinic caused by supply constraints, Carter and Rhodes realize the spread of the virus is much wider in scope. The surviving nun, showing visible signs of an Ebola infection, provokes a soldier to shoot and kill her. Carter learns from the clinic's files that a pregnant woman from another village sought care there. Hoping to find a patient who has survived the virus to better understand and treat it, Carter pays a helicopter pilot to ferry the trio to the village. After an employee of the Reston facility falls ill, Jaax and Carter prepare him for isolation and quarantine when they are stopped by Rhodes – now a Centers for Disease Control and Prevention official who resents Carter – who assumes their investigation and directs the employee to a local hospital. In a meeting between CDC and military officials, Carter warns that the virus could be airborne, though Rhodes dismisses their concerns and warns against sowing public panic. Gellis discovers that Jahrling has left quarantine. The company that owns the Reston facility shuts down the building, intending to starve the infected monkeys to death.
4	4	"Expendable"	Nick Murphy	Brian Peterson & James V. Hart	May 28, 2019	1WBC04	1.00
In 1976, Carter, Rhodes, and Melinda find that the village's faith healer has isolated the sick family in their home. Rhodes draws the woman's blood and prepares to leave before Carter reveals that the pilot will not return for three days. Jaax and Carter begin interviewing animal technicians to be part of the team euthanizing the Reston facility's monkey population, just as Jaax learns her terminally ill father has been readmitted to the hospital. Jaax tracks down Jahrling, worried about possibly spending 21 days in Fort Detrick's isolated quarantine space, at a Maryland commuter rail station. Jerry appeals to his wife's commanding officer to lead the on-site operation, much to her fury. Given the associated risk, he explains his decision by calling himself the "expendable" parent in their relationship. Even as the Reston employee's condition remains stable, Rhodes confides his unease to Melinda, now his wife. After the employee tests positive for Ebola, Jaax visits Rhodes and convinces him to test the other employees and their family members.
5	5	"Quarantine"	Nick Murphy	Story by : James V. Hart; Teleplay by : Kelly Souders & Brian Peterson & James V. Hart	May 29, 2019	1WBC05	1.01
In 1976, Rhodes and Melinda assist the pregnant villager give birth, though they are powerless to do anything but watch as she and most of her family succumb to the infection. Jerry, Carter, and the Fort Detrick animal technicians travel to Reston, though their operation is nearly aborted when a Washington Post reporter arrives. They begin the arduous process of euthanizing the animals and taking samples for testing, one not without hiccups: a technician is exposed to blood from a ripped glove and sent to quarantine, while a monkey nearly escapes through one of the building's roof vents before being recaptured. Jaax and Jahrling test blood samples from the facility's other employees and their family members, discovering two other employees are positive. Searching through the facility's files, Carter learns one monkey is apparently unaccounted for. After working for hours without a break, Jerry collapses and is rushed to the hospital.
6	6	"Hidden"	Michael Uppendahl	Story by : Kelly Souders & Jeff Vintar & James V. Hart; Teleplay by : Kelly Souders & Jeff Vintar	May 29, 2019	1WBC06	0.94
In 1976, the village's faith healer explains to Carter that the local forests, once teeming with monkeys, have gone quiet. When the faith healer's infection progresses, he convinces Carter to help spare the region's population from a much larger outbreak that would spread from his funeral. As a devastated Rhodes and Melinda watch the pregnant woman's son die from his infection, they are alerted to the faith healer's burning home by horrified villagers. An incensed Rhodes vows to report Carter. Jaax assumes leadership of the operation, even as learns her father has passed. At the hospital, she learns Jerry was suffering from severe dehydration and exhaustion, not infection. Carter and Rhodes track the missing monkey to Dulles International Airport, where they learn the monkey died in transport from the Philippines – and that a more recent delivery of monkeys originating from the same location included more sick animals still at Dulles. A CDC team euthanizes the infected monkeys. At a follow-up conference examining the outbreak, its chairman expresses relief that the virus's severe symptoms never jumped from monkeys to humans, causing Jaax to give an impassioned plea urging the organizations to be more proactive in responding to possible outbreaks. An epilogue states that the origin of the Reston virus was never found and no Ebola vaccine has been developed, though an international coalition of researchers and medical workers helped to limit deaths during recent Ebola outbreaks in 2014 and 2018.

=== Season 2: Anthrax (2021) ===
No. overall	No. in season	Title	Directed by	Written by	Original release date	Prod. code	U.S. viewers (millions)
7	1	"Noble Eagle"	Daniel Percival	Kelly Souders & Brian Peterson	November 28, 2021	2WBG01	0.28
In 1979, a missing air filter in a Soviet Union military research facility allows anthrax to escape in Sverdlovsk, causing an outbreak that is quickly covered up. Fourteen years later, a Russian defector confirms the existence of the outbreak with the preserved heart of a victim. He warns U.S. officials of the possibility of a future outbreak from weaponized anthrax. Three weeks after the September 11 attacks, Florida resident Robert Stevens is hospitalized with worsening medical symptoms; after the CDC and FBI are contacted, testing at Fort Detrick – some conducted by Dr. Bruce Edwards Ivins – confirms Stevens was exposed to anthrax. FBI agent Matthew Ryker travels to Florida and learns that Stevens was likely exposed to anthrax at the American Media Inc. offices where he worked in Boca Raton, via a since-discarded package laced with white powder. As news breaks of the anthrax exposure, Erin O'Connor, an assistant to NBC News anchor Tom Brokaw tasked with researching anthrax, learns that a dark scab she believed was a spider bite is likely a symptom of anthrax exposure. When Stevens dies, Ryker takes over the investigation from the CDC and informs their investigator that the anthrax is from the Ames strain, a type of anthrax originating in the U.S. that last appeared outside high-security laboratory settings 20 years prior. At Fort Detrick, Ivins finds evidence that his office has been tampered with.
8	2	"Hell's Chimney"	John Fawcett	Mac Marshall	November 28, 2021	2WBG02	0.23
On September 11, Ivins leads a chaotic evacuation of USAMRIID after planes strike the World Trade Center. En route to New York, Ryker witnesses American Airlines Flight 77 flying overheard toward the Pentagon. O'Connor is able to recall that the last suspicious mail she handled was taken for processing in a green bag. Ryker travels to 30 Rockefeller Plaza to search for the package and attempts to shut down the entire building, but is blocked from doing so by Rudy Giuliani. O'Connor's scab tests negative for anthrax; because O'Connor was taking Cipro to treat the presumed spider bite, Ryker has the CDC try a more advanced test which comes back positive. Ryker locates the letter and learns of anthrax exposures involving similar letters at the New York Post and CBS News, as well as the infant of an ABC News employee. An increasingly paranoid Ivins meets with his therapist and begins to suspect his colleague Simon Kurz of being the source of the attacks, finding Cipro in Kurz's wastebasket. Ryker's partner Chris Moore tracks the Trenton postmark on the NBC News letter to a USPS regional hub, where he learns the letter could have originated from one of more than 600 blue boxes.
9	3	"Neither Rain Nor Sleet..."	John Fawcett	Cathryn Humphris	November 29, 2021	2WBG03	0.41
On Oct. 15, 2001, a staffer for Senator Tom Daschle opens an anthrax-laced letter in the Hart Senate Office Building. Several employees at the USPS Brentwood distribution center are also exposed during the letter's transit. Ryker and FBI special agent Dani Toretti, a criminal profiler, begin working together. Ivins confides his suspicions about Kurz with another colleague offers his expertise in anthrax to the colonel. He conducts more tests on the Daschle letter and claims the anthrax was laced with bentonite, which would link its origin to Iraq. When Ryker and Toretti discover that some victims were infected via still sealed envelopes, they move to shut down the USPS facilities that handled the letters. They also learn that Brentwood employees Thomas Morris and Joseph Curseen have died as a result of their exposure. A second letter laced with anthrax addressed to Senator Patrick Leahy is found. Ryker expresses skepticism at the anthrax's supposed connection to Iraq or Al-Qaeda. Two more people unconnected to any of the exposure sites die from anthrax, and Ryker learns one of them received a letter that was sorted at Brentwood seconds after the Daschle letter. Recognizing the style of handwriting in the letters as one commonly taught in the U.S. between the 1940s and 1960s, Toretti compiles a profile identifying the likely suspect as a lone wolf American scientist with access to high-security lab environments. She sends it to the email list of the American Society for Microbiology, causing one woman to respond that she knows someone that fits the profile.
10	4	"Dream Boldly, Live Fully"	Courtney Hunt	Jeff Vintar	November 29, 2021	2WBG04	0.35
The investigation's funding and manpower rises in an effort to conclusively prove the link to a foreign adversary. After comparing Ivins's imaging with that of anthrax spores recovered from Iraq after the first Gulf War, Ryker provides evidence to his superior officer that the spores do not match. The FBI interviews the woman who replied to Toretti's email, Nancy Haigwood. A college classmate of Ivins at the University of North Carolina, she reports his obsessive and menacing behavior towards her and other members of her Kappa Kappa Gamma sorority, but the senior FBI agent dismisses her concerns. Meeting with his therapist again, Ivins confides in her about a recent series of out-of-body experiences, which the therapist explains may be a side effect of his medication. At work, he continues sending a former colleague harassing emails, causing her to inform a new colleague of his behavior – which Ivins is alerted to by spyware software he has installed. In New Jersey, Moore finds anthrax spores on the drop box where the letters originated, located near the Kappa Kappa Gamma house at Princeton University. Ryker orders a reprint of the envelopes used in the anthrax letters, hoping to match imperfections in the printing and trace their point of sale, and finds a match that connects the envelope sales to a USPS branch a short drive from USAMRIID and Fort Detrick.
11	5	"Stentor Roeselii"	Courtney Hunt	Mac Marshall & Jeff Vintar	November 30, 2021	2WBG05	0.30
In a therapy session, an irate Ivins reveals that the FBI has subpoenaed anthrax samples from USAMRIID. As the Senate votes to send U.S. troops into Iraq, the FBI again expands its anthrax investigative team and demands new leads. At Fort Detrick, Ivins is upbraided by his supervisors for failing to submit his samples properly or on time. During interviews with USAMRIID scientists, Toretti notices the unease in some female employees when speaking about Ivins and searches his email communications, finding his suspicious messages. Ivins's alarms are raised when a different FBI team led by Eric Sykes carries out a public search of USAMRIID. After learning about Ivins surprising a female colleague and causing a contamination event in the laboratory, Ryker decides they must question Ivins before he has a chance to decontaminate the lab and destroy potential evidence. Ryker's PTSD from the Pentagon attack is triggered during a heated line of questioning to Ivins. A more confident Ivins passes a polygraph test, casting doubts on his complicity. Sykes presents another possible suspect, virologist Steven Hatfill, and an unconvinced Ryker is reassigned to investigate Hatfill. Sykes and Ryker search Hatfill's home and storage unit, finding a novel manuscript about a viral outbreak and hand-drawn maps. At the same time, Ivins begins to cover up his own suspicious activity, destroying a sorority code book he had admitted to stealing and rolling back his station wagon's odometer.
12	6	"RMR–1029"	Daniel Percival	Kelly Souders & Brian Peterson	November 30, 2021	2WBG06	0.30
The FBI follows Hatfill's map to a remote pond, finding only a turtle trap. Ryker is shocked when Ivins shows up at the search site. Though Hatfill is exonerated, he is still harassed by law enforcement. Increasingly unstable, Ivins begins to mix his medications with alcohol. Moore searches Ivins's trash, connecting the proximity of the Princeton mailbox to the sorority house and discovering a patent for an anthrax vaccine. Ryker theorizes that Ivins sent the letters as a way to require the vaccine to be put into wide use and his contributions to its development be recognized. Ivins is reported by his therapist after making threats toward his USAMRIID colleagues during an outburst at a group therapy session and is involuntarily committed. The FBI executes search warrants at Ivins's home and at USAMRIID, where Ryker learns that Ivins only submitted four anthrax samples of more than 40 he had in cold storage. Ryker informs Ivins he is likely to be charged with murder and prosecutors may pursue the death penalty. Tests match Ivins's anthrax sample RMR-1029 to the anthrax used in the letters. With concrete evidence that Ivins attempted to switch the sample to cover his tracks, a warrant for his arrest is issued. Ivins is released from the psychiatric facility and threatens his therapist over the phone, causing her to contact the FBI and reveal the extent of his mental instability, driven by childhood trauma. At his empty home, Ivins begins drinking and discovers a note from his wife. Ryker and Toretti arrive to learn Ivins has committed suicide. An epilogue states that Ivins was never arrested or charged with the anthrax attacks, while Hatfill sued the U.S. government and was formally exonerated.

== Production ==
=== Development ===
On April 18, 2018, it was announced that National Geographic had given a series order to the production. Executive producers were set to include Lynda Obst, Kelly Souders, Brian Peterson, Jeff Vintar, and Ridley Scott. Production companies involved with the series were slated to consist of Fox 21 Television Studios, Scott Free Productions, and Lynda Obst Productions. On August 9, 2018, it was announced that Kelly Souders and Brian Wayne Peterson were joining the series as showrunners, executive producers, and writers. On February 8, 2019, it was announced that the series would premiere on May 27, 2019. In November 2020, National Geographic renewed the series for a second season.

=== Casting ===
On July 25, 2018, it was announced during the Television Critics Association's annual summer press tour that Julianna Margulies had been cast in the first season's lead role. On September 13, 2018, it was reported that Noah Emmerich, Liam Cunningham, Topher Grace, Paul James, Nick Searcy, Robert Wisdom, and Robert Sean Leonard had joined the cast in starring roles and that James D'Arcy would make a guest starring appearance. On December 6, 2018, it was announced that Grace Gummer would appear in a recurring capacity.

In early 2021, following the announcement of a second season with a different story, Tony Goldwyn, Daniel Dae Kim, Harry Hamlin, Dylan Baker, Ian Colletti Dawn Olivieri, and Denyce Lawton were announced as cast members.

=== Filming ===
Principal photography for the first season took place from September 13, 2018, to November 16, 2018, in Toronto and was also expected to film in South Africa. Exterior photography of the rear loading docks of the "monkey lab" took place at the now-closed Life Savers Factory located at 100 Cumberland Ave, Hamilton, Ontario. Loading docks can be viewed from Burris Street as well as homes in reverse shots. Exterior and interior shots of "Commuter Station" took place at the historic Hamilton Canadian National Railway Station, located at 360 James St N, in Hamilton, Ontario.

== Release ==
On December 20, 2018, a "first look" still image from the series was released featuring Julianna Margulies in character as Dr. Nancy Jaax. On February 8, 2019, a trailer for the series was released.

The show airs on National Geographic.

The series is available to stream internationally with Disney+ through its Star hub, with the second season released in selected territories. The entire series was removed from Disney+ on May 26, 2023, implying it may have been silently cancelled.

== Going Viral ==
Going Viral is a 2019 one-hour documentary companion to the miniseries.

On February 8, 2019, it was announced that National Geographic had greenlit a companion documentary film to premiere alongside the series in May 2019. The film was set to be executive produced by Betsy Forhan and feature interviews with subjects including Richard Preston, Dr. Nahid Bhadelia, Dr. Anthony S. Fauci, Dr. Pardis Sabeti, and Dr. Ian Crozier. The production company involved with the film was slated to be National Geographic Studios.

== Reception ==
=== Critical response ===
Rotten Tomatoes gave an approval rating of 85%, based on 20 reviews. Its critical consensus reads: "An anxiety-producing dramatization of real-world events, The Hot Zone acts as a sobering reminder of exactly how deadly a disease can be." On Metacritic, the season had a score of 69 out of 100, based on 12 reviews, indicating "generally favorable reviews".

=== Accolades ===
Year	Award	Category	Nominee(s)	Result	Ref.
2020	Women's Image Network Awards	Outstanding Actress Made for Television Movie / Mini-Series	Julianna Margulies	Won	
2020	Women's Image Network Awards	Outstanding Made for Television Movie	The Hot Zone	Nominated	
