= List of The New York Times number-one books of 1995 =

The American daily newspaper The New York Times publishes multiple weekly lists ranking the best selling books in the United States.

== Fiction ==
The following list ranks the number-one best selling fiction books, in the hardcover fiction category.

Date	Book	Author
January 1	Politically Correct Bedtime Stories	James Finn Garner
January 8	Politically Correct Bedtime Stories	James Finn Garner
January 15	Politically Correct Bedtime Stories	James Finn Garner
January 22	The Celestine Prophecy	James Redfield
January 29	The Celestine Prophecy	James Redfield
February 5	The Celestine Prophecy	James Redfield
February 12	The Celestine Prophecy	James Redfield
February 19	The Celestine Prophecy	James Redfield
February 26	The Celestine Prophecy	James Redfield
March 5	The Celestine Prophecy	James Redfield
March 12	The Celestine Prophecy	James Redfield
March 19	The Celestine Prophecy	James Redfield
March 26	The Celestine Prophecy	James Redfield
April 2	The Celestine Prophecy	James Redfield
April 9	The Celestine Prophecy	James Redfield
April 16	The Celestine Prophecy	James Redfield
April 23	The Celestine Prophecy	James Redfield
April 30	The Rainmaker	John Grisham
May 7	The Rainmaker	John Grisham
May 14	The Rainmaker	John Grisham
May 21	The Rainmaker	John Grisham
May 28	The Rainmaker	John Grisham
June 4	The Rainmaker	John Grisham
June 11	The Rainmaker	John Grisham
June 18	The Rainmaker	John Grisham
June 25	The Bridges of Madison County	Robert James Waller
July 2	The Rainmaker	John Grisham
July 9	The Bridges of Madison County	Robert James Waller
July 16	Beach Music	Pat Conroy
July 23	Beach Music	Pat Conroy
July 30	Memnoch the Devil	Anne Rice
August 6	Memnoch the Devil	Anne Rice
August 13	Beach Music	Pat Conroy
August 20	Memnoch the Devil	Anne Rice
August 27	From Potter's Field	Patricia Cornwell
September 3	From Potter's Field	Patricia Cornwell
September 10	From Potter's Field	Patricia Cornwell
September 17	"L" Is for Lawless	Sue Grafton
September 24	"L" Is for Lawless	Sue Grafton
October 1	The Horse Whisperer	Nicholas Evans
October 8	The Lost World	Michael Crichton
October 15	The Lost World	Michael Crichton
October 22	The Lost World	Michael Crichton
October 29	The Lost World	Michael Crichton
November 5	The Lost World	Michael Crichton
November 12	The Lost World	Michael Crichton
November 19	The Lost World	Michael Crichton
November 26	The Lost World	Michael Crichton
December 3	Five Days in Paris	Danielle Steel
December 10	Five Days in Paris	Danielle Steel
December 17	The Christmas Box	Richard Paul Evans
December 24	The Christmas Box	Richard Paul Evans
December 31	The Christmas Box	Richard Paul Evans

== Nonfiction ==
The following list ranks the number-one best selling nonfiction books, in the hardcover nonfiction category.

Date	Book	Author
January 1	Don't Stand Too Close to a Naked Man	Tim Allen
January 8	Crossing the Threshold of Hope	John Paul II
January 15	Crossing the Threshold of Hope	John Paul II
January 22	Crossing the Threshold of Hope	John Paul II
January 29	Crossing the Threshold of Hope	John Paul II
February 5	The Hot Zone	Richard Preston
February 12	I Want to Tell You	O. J. Simpson
February 19	I Want to Tell You	O. J. Simpson
February 26	I Want to Tell You	O. J. Simpson
March 5	I Want to Tell You	O. J. Simpson
March 12	I Want to Tell You	O. J. Simpson
March 19	Breaking the Surface	Greg Louganis with Eric Marcus
March 26	Breaking the Surface	Greg Louganis with Eric Marcus
April 2	Breaking the Surface	Greg Louganis with Eric Marcus
April 9	Breaking the Surface	Greg Louganis with Eric Marcus
April 16	Breaking the Surface	Greg Louganis with Eric Marcus
April 23	The Hot Zone	Richard Preston
April 30	In Retrospect	Robert S. McNamara with Brian VanDeMark
May 7	In Retrospect	Robert S. McNamara with Brian VanDeMark
May 14	In Retrospect	Robert S. McNamara with Brian VanDeMark
May 21	In Retrospect	Robert S. McNamara with Brian VanDeMark
May 28	The Hot Zone	Richard Preston
June 4	The Hot Zone	Richard Preston
June 11	The Hot Zone	Richard Preston
June 18	The Hot Zone	Richard Preston
June 25	The Hot Zone	Richard Preston
July 2	A Good Walk Spoiled	John Feinstein
July 9	The Hot Zone	Richard Preston
July 16	New Passages	Gail Sheehy
July 23	To Renew America	Newt Gingrich
July 30	To Renew America	Newt Gingrich
August 6	To Renew America	Newt Gingrich
August 13	To Renew America	Newt Gingrich
August 20	To Renew America	Newt Gingrich
August 27	To Renew America	Newt Gingrich
September 3	To Renew America	Newt Gingrich
September 10	My Point... and I Do Have One	Ellen DeGeneres
September 17	My Point... and I Do Have One	Ellen DeGeneres
September 24	My Point... and I Do Have One	Ellen DeGeneres
October 1	My American Journey	Colin L. Powell with Joseph E. Persico
October 8	My American Journey	Colin L. Powell with Joseph E. Persico
October 15	My American Journey	Colin L. Powell with Joseph E. Persico
October 22	My American Journey	Colin L. Powell with Joseph E. Persico
October 29	My American Journey	Colin L. Powell with Joseph E. Persico
November 5	My American Journey	Colin L. Powell with Joseph E. Persico
November 12	My American Journey	Colin L. Powell with Joseph E. Persico
November 19	My American Journey	Colin L. Powell with Joseph E. Persico
November 26	Miss America	Howard Stern
December 3	Miss America	Howard Stern
December 10	My American Journey	Colin L. Powell with Joseph E. Persico
December 17	The Road Ahead	Bill Gates with Nathan Myhrvold and Peter Rinearson
December 24	The Road Ahead	Bill Gates with Nathan Myhrvold and Peter Rinearson
December 31	The Road Ahead	Bill Gates with Nathan Myhrvold and Peter Rinearson

== See also ==
- Publishers Weekly list of bestselling novels in the United States in the 1990s
