= The Hot Zone =

1994 nonfiction book by Richard Preston

The Hot Zone: The Terrifying True Story of the Origins of the Ebola Virus
- Author: Richard Preston
- Language: English
- Subjects: Virology, Ebola Virus, Medical, Epidemiology
- Genre: Nonfiction
- Publisher: 1st Anchor Books Edition; Knopf Doubleday Publishing Group
- Publication date: September 20, 1994
- Publication place: South Africa, United States
- Media type: Print (paperback and hardback) eBook and audiobook
- Pages: 368
- ISBN: 0-385-47956-5
- OCLC: 32052009
- Dewey Decimal: 614.5/7 20
- LC Class: RC140.5 .P74 1994
- Website: https://richard-preston.net/book/the-hot-zone/

The Hot Zone: A Terrifying True Story is a best-selling 1994 nonfiction thriller by Richard Preston about the origins and incidents involving viral hemorrhagic fevers, particularly ebolaviruses and marburgviruses. The basis of the book was Preston's 1992 New Yorker article "Crisis in the Hot Zone".

The filoviruses—including Ebola virus, Sudan virus, Marburg virus, and Ravn virus—are Biosafety Level 4 agents, extremely dangerous to humans because they are very infectious, have a high fatality rate, and most have no known measures, treatments, or cures. Along with describing the history of the devastation caused by two of these Central African diseases, Ebola virus disease and Marburg virus disease, Preston described a 1989 incident in which a relative of Ebola virus, Reston virus, was discovered at a primate quarantine facility in Reston, Virginia, less than 15 miles (24 km) away from Washington, D.C.

== Synopsis ==
The book is in four sections:

1. "The Shadow of Mount Elgon" delves into the history of filoviruses, as well as speculation about the origins of AIDS. Preston recounts the story of "Charles Monet" (a pseudonym), who might have caught Marburg virus from visiting Kitum Cave on Mount Elgon in Kenya. The author describes the progression of the disease, from the initial headache and backache, to the final stage in which Monet's internal organs fail and he hemorrhages extensively in a waiting room in a Nairobi hospital. This part also introduces a promising young physician who became infected with Marburg virus while treating Monet. Nancy Jaax's story is told. Viruses, biosafety levels and procedures are described. The Ebola virus disease outbreaks caused by Ebola virus and its cousin, Sudan virus, are mentioned. Preston talks to the man who named the Ebola virus.
2. "The Monkey House" chronicles the discovery of Reston virus among imported monkeys in Reston, Virginia, and the following actions taken by the U.S. Army and Centers for Disease Control. It starts with the monkey house receiving a shipment of 100 wild monkeys. After four weeks, 29 of these monkeys have died. This is followed by the veterinarian for the facility, Dan Dalgard, examining the dead monkeys and sending the samples to Peter Jahrling, a virologist at United States Army Medical Research Institute of Infectious Diseases. After seeing a rope-like virus under the microscope, it is suspected that the monkeys were infected with a hot agent similar to the Marburg virus. Jahrling then conducts a blood test to find out that the hot agent is the Ebola Zaire virus. This conclusion leads to the Army Medical Research Institute deciding to euthanize all the monkeys in the same room as the infected monkeys.
3. "Smashdown" is more on the Reston epizootic, which involved a strain of the virus that does not affect humans but which easily spreads by air, and is very similar to its cousin the Ebola virus.
4. "Kitum Cave" tells of the author's visit to the cave that is the suspected home of the natural host animal in which the Marburg virus lives.

The book starts with "Charles Monet" visiting Kitum Cave during a camping trip to Mount Elgon in Central Africa. Not long after, he begins to suffer from a number of symptoms, including vomiting, diarrhea and red eye. He is taken to Nairobi Hospital for treatment, but his condition deteriorates further, and he goes into a coma while in the waiting room. This particular filovirus is called Marburg virus.

Nancy Jaax had been promoted to work in the Level 4 Biosafety containment area at the United States Army Medical Research Institute of Infectious Diseases, and is assigned to research Ebola virus. While preparing food for her family at home, she cuts her right hand. Later, while working on a dead monkey infected with Ebola virus, one of the gloves on the hand with the open wound tears, and she is almost exposed to contaminated blood, but does not get infected. Nurse Mayinga is also infected by a nun and goes to Ngaleima Hospital in Kinshasa for treatment, where she succumbs to the disease.

In Reston, Virginia, less than fifteen miles (24 km) away from Washington, D.C., a company called Hazelton Research once operated a quarantine center for monkeys that were destined for laboratories. In October 1989, when an unusually high number of their monkeys began to die, their veterinarian decided to send some samples to Fort Detrick (USAMRIID) for study.

Early during the testing process in biosafety level 3, when one of the flasks appeared to be contaminated with harmless pseudomonas bacterium, two USAMRIID scientists exposed themselves to the virus by wafting the flask. The virus found at the facility was a mutated form of the original Ebola virus and was initially mistaken for simian hemorrhagic fever virus. They later determine that, while the virus is lethal to monkeys, humans can be infected with it without any health effects at all. This virus is now known as Reston virus.

Finally, the author goes to Africa to explore Kitum Cave. On the way, he discusses the role of AIDS in the present, as the Kinshasa Highway that he travels on was sometimes called the "AIDS Highway" after its early appearance in the region. Equipped with a hazmat suit, he enters the cave and finds a large number of animals, one of which might be the virus carrier. At the conclusion of the book, he travels to the quarantine facility in Reston. He finds the building abandoned and deteriorating. He concludes the book by claiming that Ebola will be back.

== Reston virus outbreak ==
The discovery of the Reston virus was made in November 1989 by Thomas W. Geisbert, an intern at United States Army Medical Research Institute of Infectious Diseases. Peter B. Jahrling isolated the filovirus further. The Centers for Disease Control and Prevention conducted blood tests of the 178 animal handlers. While six tested positive, they did not exhibit any symptoms. The Reston virus was found to have low pathogenicity in humans. This was further supported later when a handler infected himself during a necropsy of an infected monkey, as the handler did not show symptoms of the virus after the incubation period.

== Reception ==
The Hot Zone was listed as one of around 100 books that shaped a century of science by American Scientist. Many reviews of The Hot Zone exemplify the impact the book had on the public's view of emerging viruses. A review in the British Medical Journal captures the paranoia and public panic described in this book. The reviewer was left "wondering when and where this enigmatic agent will appear next and what other disasters may await human primates". This can also be seen in a review in the Public Health Reports which highlights the "seriousness of our current situation" and "our ability to respond to a major health threat".

The Hot Zone was described in an academic journal covering research in the history of science as a "romantic account of environmental transgression". Reactions to this book could be seen not only in the public's view of emerging viruses, but in the changes in the Centers for Disease Control and Prevention. In addition to the funding of public health infrastructure during the early 1970s, there were many public discussions of biodefense. This book continued to fuel the emerging diseases campaign. By connecting international health to national security, this campaign used The Hot Zone to justify increased intervention in the global phenomena of disease.

The Hot Zone elicited a major response by the World Health Organization (WHO) by shedding light on the Zaire ebolavirus. Teams of experts were immediately released. Many countries tightened their borders, issued warnings to customs officials, quarantined travellers, and issued travel advisories.

In his blurb, horror writer Stephen King called the first chapter "one of the most horrifying things I've read in my whole life". When asked whether any book "scared the pants off you" writer Suzanne Collins answered "The Hot Zone, by Richard Preston. I just read it a few weeks ago. Still recovering."

The Hot Zone has received criticism for sensationalizing the effects of Ebola virus. In their memoir Level 4: Virus Hunters of the CDC (1996), former CDC scientists Joseph B. McCormick and Susan Fisher-Hoch lambasted Preston for claiming that Ebola dissolves organs, stating that although it causes great blood loss in tissues the organs remain structurally intact. McCormick and Fisher-Hoch also dispute Preston's version of the CDC's actions in the Reston virus incident.

In an interview about his book Ebola: The Natural and Human History of a Deadly Virus (2014), David Quammen claimed that The Hot Zone had "vivid, gruesome details" that gave an "exaggerated idea of Ebola over the years" causing "people to view this disease as though it was some sort of preternatural phenomenon".

== Dramatizations ==
=== Failed film adaptation ===
In January 1993, 20th Century Fox producer Lynda Obst won a bidding war for the film rights to Preston's 1992 New Yorker article, which was still being transitioned into book form. In response to being outbid, Warner Bros. producer Arnold Kopelson immediately began working on a similarly themed production. This competing film, Outbreak, was ultimately a factor in the collapse of Fox's planned production, Crisis in The Hot Zone.

Directors considered for Crisis in The Hot Zone included Wolfgang Petersen, who later directed Outbreak, Michael Mann, and Ridley Scott. Scott signed on to direct the film in February 1994. Screenwriter James V. Hart was signed to adapt the book. In late April 1994, Fox announced they had signed Robert Redford and Jodie Foster to star in the film.

Crisis in The Hot Zone was never made. Foster dropped out of the film two weeks before filming was to begin having not been satisfied by her character as written in the script. Production was delayed, with Meryl Streep, Sharon Stone, and Robin Wright touted as possible replacements. In August 1994, Redford dropped out of the film. A few days after Redford left it was announced that pre-production had been shut down.

=== Television series ===
On October 16, 2014, The Hollywood Reporter announced that Ridley Scott again planned to adapt the book, this time as a television miniseries for NatGeo. Kelly Souders, Brian Peterson, and Jeff Vintar wrote the pilot. Julianna Margulies starred as Nancy Jaax. Filming began in September 2018. Lynda Obst again produced the series. The series first aired from May 27 to May 29, 2019, and was later renewed for a second season.

== See also ==
- C.J. Peters
- Hot zone (environment)
- The Demon in the Freezer
- United States Army Medical Research Institute of Infectious Diseases
