= Hot zone (environment) =

Area that is considered to be dangerous

Hot zone, also written as hot-zone or hotzone, refers to an area or region that is significantly affected by environmental hazards or risks. It may refer to a location where there is high pollution, contamination, or a concentration of hazardous substances or activities.

== Etymology ==
The term hot zone was likely coined during the Cold War where it described locations rendered hazardous due to nuclear contamination. The term was later extended to areas or locations considered to be hazardous such as Level-4 biosafety labs, places in which there is active conflict, and so forth.

The term hot zone was popularized by the 1995 book The Hot Zone by Richard Preston, and the film Outbreak, released the same year.

== Types of hot zones ==
=== Biological ===
The biological zone describes an area or location where there is a risk of exposure to biological agents or contaminants that can cause harm to human health or the environment. It is often associated with situations involving the release, presence, or spread of infectious diseases, pathogens, or biological hazards.

Precautions are taken in a gradient level of protection.

==== Malaria ====
In Peru deforestation is leading to the distribution of Malaria. With the forests being destroyed the wildlife is as well, leaving malaria looking for a new host. Malaria is a very dangerous disease, so much so that vaccinations are required for traveling into places suspected of housing the disease. Malaria is a disease that is found predominantly in third world, low-income countries. Malaria along with other insect diseases are learning to adapt to life in the city. In Peru a port city called Iquitos the population has been growing in the past 10 years making it prime for mosquitoes to flourish. These mosquitoes also bring in Dengue Fever, in which 5 percent of its victims will die.

==== Clean water ====
With an increased world population in the early 21st century water borne diseases have become the most pressing hot zone. With a lot of the worlds population moving into the city it is hard separating sanitation and clean water. In the early 1990s a cholera epidemic broke out in a fishing village in Lima, Peru. Many thought that this was coming from the seafood, but it was really from the water the seafood was cleaned with. Cholera starts when infected human waste seeps into the water supply of a community. Not having a clean water supply is something that affects a third world country the most, though there are cases of poor water in the States. In Maryland's Chesapeake Bay fisherman have seen a decline in their catch over the last couple of years. A few years ago fisherman of Maryland's Chesapeake Bay area started noticing lesions on the crabs and fish they caught and soon the fisherman were sick themselves. Industrial waste, sewage and pesticides have slowly sunk into the Chesapeake Bay over the past decade.

=== Chemical ===
A chemical hot zone refers to locations where chemical spills or releases have occurred, industrial sites with a high concentration of chemical production or storage, areas affected by chemical accidents or incidents, or regions with ongoing chemical contamination.

In such situations, there may be an increased risk of chemical exposure and potential adverse effects on human health and the environment. The specific chemicals involved in a chemical hot zone can vary, ranging from toxic substances, carcinogens, flammable materials, or volatile organic compounds (VOCs).

To manage and mitigate risks in a chemical hot zone, appropriate safety measures need to be implemented. These may include containment and cleanup procedures, personal protective equipment for workers or responders, monitoring of air and water quality, evacuation or restriction measures, and remediation efforts to reduce or eliminate the presence of hazardous chemicals.

=== Nuclear ===
The presence of radioactive contamination poses potential risks to human health and the environment. Exposure to radioactive materials can occur through inhalation, ingestion, or direct contact with contaminated surfaces. The effects can vary depending on the type and amount of radiation, duration of exposure, and individual susceptibility.

Short-term effects of radioactive contamination can include radiation sickness, burns, and acute health effects. Long-term exposure may increase the risk of developing various cancers, genetic mutations, and other chronic health conditions.

Contamination can also have environmental consequences, including damage to ecosystems, disruptions in the food chain, and the persistence of radioactive materials in the environment for extended periods.

In March 2011, a 9.0-magnitude earthquake and its accompanying tsunami struck a nuclear power station in Fukushima Daiichi area of northeastern Japan. A number of safety systems were badly damaged by the tsunami leading to a loss-of-coolant (LOCA) event which damaged the nuclear core of several reactors. The Nuclear and Industrial Safety Agency (NISA) announced that the subsequent release of radioactivity into atmosphere qualified as the highest level of radiological event scale, INES level 7. The radioactive materials released in Fukushima Daiichi area are mostly iodine-131 and cesium-137.

The Nuclear and Industrial Safety Agency estimated the cancer consequence of the Fukushima Daiichi accident. From the government statistics, around the two million people who live within 80 kilometre radius of the nuclear plate, and about one million people live in areas contaminated with cesium-137.

==== Land contamination ====
The loss of coolant further caused hydrogen explosions in the facility. As the fuel temperature went up, zirconium alloy cladding reacted with the hot steam removing oxygen from water molecule, leaving hydrogen gas. The hydrogen gas was ultimately vented off into the reactor building, because of the design of the facility, mixing with air and creating an explosive environment.

==== Disease ====
Diseases are estimated that thyroid cancer is the main cancer which affected by the nuclear accident. High amount of radioactive iodine mainly causes thyroid cancer, and most of the cases are the result of releasing iodine-131. If people consume food and water contaminated by iodine-131, iodine-131 (which has a half-life of eight days) concentrates in the thyroid. The most contaminated food and drink are raw milk and vegetables in Fukushima Daiichi area. Milk production was blocked after six days of the nuclear explosion.

Nuclear accidents are very serious matters. As you can see from the above statements, they can cause massive panic, disease, and not to mention the fact that humans and other organisms may not be able to inhabit the affected area for many years to come. A perfect example of this is the nuclear accident in Chernobyl, Ukraine. Chernobyl is near Pripyat, Ukraine and also the country of Belarus. Chernobyl is now a ghost town. They had a malfunction with their nuclear power plant, and now there is still a hot zone there. This hot zone actually has a name, the Chernobyl Exclusion Zone.

=== Violence ===
Violence can induce a hot zone, as occupants are subject to attacks, crossfire, or even direct fire targeted at them specifically. The most identifiable violent hot zones are in war zones, such as the war in Afghanistan. Soldiers are constantly fighting with other soldiers and insurgents to attempt to accomplish tactical goals. Hot zones are not good places to appear as a member of either of the opposing teams, because one may be prone to attacks or capture. Although war zones may have the most targeted attacks, crime ridden neighborhoods are the most common areas for crossfire to occur, and subsequently the most victims of crossfire are here.

=== Climate change ===
Climate change hot zones, also known as climate change "hotspots," refer to regions that are particularly vulnerable to the impacts of climate change. These areas are projected to experience significant changes in temperature, precipitation patterns, sea-level rise, and other climate-related factors. Climate change hot zones can vary depending on the specific impact being considered. The most vulnerable areas are:

- Arctic and Sub-Arctic Regions. These areas are experiencing rapid warming, leading to the melting of sea ice, loss of permafrost, and changes in ecosystems. The Arctic is considered a climate change hotspot due to its sensitivity to temperature changes and its potential global impacts.
- Small Island States. Low-lying island nations and coastal regions are highly vulnerable to sea-level rise and increased storm surges. These areas often face challenges in freshwater availability, food security, and infrastructure resilience.
- Coastal Areas. Many coastal regions around the world are susceptible to sea-level rise, coastal erosion, and increased storm intensity. Populated coastal cities and communities are particularly at risk from flooding and saltwater intrusion into freshwater resources.
- Sub-Saharan Africa. Parts of Sub-Saharan Africa are projected to face increased droughts, decreased agricultural productivity, and water scarcity, which can have significant impacts on food security, livelihoods, and human well-being.
- South and Southeast Asia. This region is vulnerable to a range of climate change impacts, including increased frequency and intensity of cyclones, flooding, sea-level rise, and heatwaves. These impacts can threaten densely populated areas, agricultural productivity, and water resources.
- Coral Reefs. Coral reefs are highly sensitive to rising ocean temperatures and ocean acidification. Hot zones for coral reefs include the Great Barrier Reef in Australia, the Coral Triangle in Southeast Asia, and various reef systems in the Caribbean.

== See also ==
- Zone of alienation
