= Lisa Hensley =

Lisa Hensley may refer to:

- Lisa Hensley (microbiologist), American microbiologist
- Lisa Hensley (actress), Australian actress
