= Lynda Obst =

American film producer and author (1950–2024)

- Born: Lynda Rosen; April 14, 1950; New York City, U.S.
- Died: October 22, 2024 (aged 74); Los Angeles, California, U.S.
- Education: Pomona College; Columbia University
- Occupations: Film producer; author
- Years active: 1986–2024
- Organization: Lynda Obst Productions
- Spouse: David Obst (div.)
- Children: 1

Lynda Rosen Obst (April 14, 1950 – October 22, 2024) was an American film producer and author. Her works include Sleepless in Seattle and Interstellar. Obst founded the production companies Hill/Obst Productions in 1986 and Lynda Obst Productions in 1989.

== Early life ==
Obst was born in New York City on April 14, 1950, to Robert, a garment industry businessman, and Clare Rosen, a teacher. She had two younger brothers, Rick and Michael, and grew up in Harrison, New York. As a child, she considered herself a "tomboy," playing baseball and participating in gymnastics. Obst was a graduate of Pomona College in Claremont, California, and studied philosophy in the graduate program at Columbia University. However, Obst elected to leave school to work as editor/writer on the 1978 book, The Sixties: The Decade Remembered Now, by the People who Lived it Then. She met and married literary agent David Obst.

== Career ==
Obst worked as an editor at The New York Times Magazine before moving to Los Angeles when her then-husband, David, was offered a job starting a production company. Obst's first role in film was in 1979, working in development for Peter Guber and becoming vice president of creative affairs. She then moved on to development for The Geffen Film Company, leading to her first associate producer credit for Flashdance in 1983.

In 1986, Obst partnered with Debra Hill to form one of the first all-female production companies, Hill/Obst Productions. Combining Obst's development experience with Hill's hands-on production skills, their first film was Chris Columbus's directorial debut, the 1987 film Adventures in Babysitting. Other films included Heartbreak Hotel, and The Fisher King. The Fisher King was critically successful, winning an Academy Award and totaling four nominations. After The Fisher King (1991), Obst and Hill parted ways. Obst became an in-studio producer. In 1992, she produced Nora Ephron's directorial debut, This Is My Life. She continued her collaboration with Ephron, producing Sleepless in Seattle. Other notable films that she produced during this time include One Fine Day, Someone Like You, Contact, Hope Floats, and The Siege. In 1989, Obst founded a production company, Lynda Obst Productions. Initially based at Columbia Pictures, it moved to 20th Century Fox in 1993. By 2007, the company was named Obst/Rosen Productions.

In 2009, Obst completed principal photography as producer on The Invention of Lying (originally titled "This Side of the Truth" and the directing and co-writing debut of Ricky Gervais and Matthew Robinson) starring Gervais and Jennifer Garner. It was released in October 2009. She was the producer of Gurinder Chadha's Angus, Thongs and Perfect Snogging, released by Nickelodeon in 2008. In 2014, Obst collaborated with director Christopher Nolan and co-produced Interstellar, a science-fiction drama starring Matthew McConaughey and Anne Hathaway. It marked the first time her production company, Lynda Obst Productions, was credited with a production.

Obst was the author of the memoir Hello, He Lied (1996), detailing her experiences in the modern studio system. In 2013, she wrote Sleepless in Hollywood about the shift from character-driven film to blockbusters. Obst was one of the central figures in the battle over the Richard Preston book, Crisis in the Hot Zone.

== Lynda Obst Productions ==
LRO Enterprises, Ltd.
- Trade name: Lynda Obst Productions
- Industry: Film
- Founded: 1989
- Defunct: 2024
- Headquarters: Culver City, Los Angeles, California, United States
- Key people: Lynda Obst
- Owner: Lynda Obst
- Website: lyndaobstproductions.com

LRO Enterprises, Ltd., doing business as Lynda Obst Productions, is an American film and television production company started by Lynda Obst. She formed the company in 1989 and moved it to Columbia Pictures. In 1993, her company moved to 20th Century Fox. While Obst had producer credits for films from the 1980s, Interstellar was the first to display her company banner.

== Personal life ==
Obst has several relatives in media. Her brother Rick was one of the founders of the Endeavor talent agency, while her brother Michael was the Northeast bureau chief for ABC News. Obst had one son, who also became a talent manager and producer.

In 1997, she bought a home in Texas. Obst was a good friend of writer Susan Berman. She appeared in the 2015 documentary The Jinx, speaking about her friend's murder. Obst went on to testify at Durst's trial, recounting a conversation where Durst asked Berman to help him conceal his wife's disappearance.

== Death ==
Lynda Obst died at her home in Los Angeles on October 22, 2024, at the age of 74. She had COPD (chronic obstructive pulmonary disease) at the time of her death, having been a longtime smoker. In 2025, the Producers Guild of America announced that she would receive a posthumous Trailblazer Award in recognition of her contributions to create opportunities for fellow female producers.

== Filmography ==
Obst was a producer in all films unless otherwise noted.

=== Film ===
Year	Film	Credit
1983	Flashdance	Associate producer
1987	Adventures in Babysitting	
1988	Heartbreak Hotel	
1991	The Fisher King	
1992	This Is My Life	
1993	Sleepless in Seattle	Executive producer
1994	Bad Girls	Executive producer
1996	One Fine Day	
1997	Contact	Executive producer
1998	Hope Floats	
1998	The Siege	
2001	Someone like You	
2002	Abandon	
2003	How to Lose a Guy in 10 Days	
2008	Angus, Thongs and Perfect Snogging	
2009	The Invention of Lying	
2014	Interstellar	

Thanks

Year	Film	Role
1995	Pie in the Sky	Thanks
2003	I Love Your Work	Special thanks
2009	A Single Man	The producers wish to thank
2019	Above Suspicion	Special thanks

=== Television ===
Year	Title	Credit	Notes	Other notes	Ref.
1989	Adventures in Babysitting	Executive producer		Television pilot	
1999	The '60s	Executive producer			
2002	Hello, He Lied & Other Truths from the Hollywood Trenches	Executive producer	Uncredited	Documentary	
2012–14	The Soul Man	Executive producer			
2014–15	Helix	Executive producer			
2010–15	Hot in Cleveland	Executive producer			
2015–16	Good Girls Revolt	Executive producer			
2019	The Hot Zone	Executive producer			
2021	The Hot Zone: Anthrax	Executive producer			

As writer

Year	Title	Notes	Other notes
2002	Hello, He Lied & Other Truths from the Hollywood Trenches	Documentary	Uncredited

== Publications ==
- The Sixties (Random House: New York, NY, 1978. ISBN 978-0394732398)
- Dirty Dreams: A Novel (New Amer Library Trade: New York, NY, 1990. ISBN 0-453-00731-7)
- Hello, He Lied (Little, Brown & Company: New York, NY, 1996. ISBN 0-316-62211-7)
- Sleepless in Hollywood: Tales from the New Abnormal in the Movie Business (Simon & Schuster: New York, NY, 2013. ISBN 978-1476727745)
