= The Demon in the Freezer =

2002 nonfiction book by Richard Preston

- First edition
- Author: Richard Preston
- Language: English
- Genre: non-fiction
- Publisher: Random House
- Publication date: 2002
- Publication place: United States
- Media type: Print (paperback and hardback) eBook and audiobook
- Pages: 304
- ISBN: 0-345-46663-2

The Demon in the Freezer is a 2002 nonfiction book on the biological weapon agents smallpox and anthrax and how the American government develops defensive measures against them. It was written by journalist Richard Preston, also author of the best-selling book The Hot Zone (1994), about ebolavirus outbreaks in Africa and Reston, Virginia and the U.S. government's response to them. Preston decided to write the book following the 2001 anthrax attacks, discussing the two diseases together because both could be potentially used as biological weapons.

The book is primarily an account of the Smallpox Eradication Program (1967–1980), the ongoing belief of the U.S. government that smallpox is still a potential bioterrorism agent, and the controversy over whether or not the remaining samples of smallpox virus in Atlanta and Moscow (the "demon" in the freezer) should be finally destroyed. Many reviewers praised Preston's writing style, but some found the attempts to interweave the anthrax investigation with the smallpox material "klutzy" and "disjointed".

== Synopsis ==
- Section 1, "Something in the Air", begins with a day-by-day account of the anthrax letter attacks in Florida and Washington, D.C., for the period 2 to 15 October 2001. Robert Stevens, a photo retoucher for the tabloid The Sun, was a victim and US Senator Tom Daschle was an intended victim. The facts of the FBI, the CDC and the U.S. Army Medical Research Institute of Infectious Diseases (USAMRIID) are detailed.
- Section 2, "The Dreaming Demon", looks back to an outbreak of smallpox at St Walburga Hospital in Meschede, Germany. The successful efforts organized by local public health authorities and the WHO—including a textbook example of ring vaccination containment—are described.
- Section 3, "To Bhola Island", describes the varieties and evolution of poxviruses and the history of smallpox in particular. The story of the SEP, Smallpox Eradication Program, referred to throughout as "the Eradication", led by DA Henderson and others is recounted. The more personal story of physician, counterculture figure, and future virtual community pioneer Lawrence Brilliant is told as his Indian guru, Neem Karoli Baba, exhorts him in 1970 to join the SEP and "go eradicate smallpox". Brilliant ended up fighting the outbreak at the Tatanagar Railway Station in Bihar. The Maximum Containment Facility (MCF) of the CDC in Atlanta is described.
- Section 4, "The Other Side of the Moon", begins with an account of the 1989 defection to the United Kingdom of Vladimir Pasechnik, the first Soviet bioweaponeer to flee to the West. Pasechnik described Biopreparat, the Soviet biological weapons program, to MI6, including their genetically modified, antibiotic resistant plague and their smallpox program at the site known as Vector. The fact that the Russians had ICBMs armed with both plague and smallpox is revealed. Various biological weapon facilities in Russia and Iraq are described. The history and work of the Ad Hoc Committee on Orthopox Infections is related. This group of the WHO has been hotly debated since 1980 over the fate of the remaining samples of smallpox in the last two official repositories. DA Henderson has been in favor of destruction. US Army scientist Peter Jahrling has been against it on the basis that further research is needed, since smallpox almost certainly exists, he believes, outside of the repositories.
- Section 5, "A Woman with a Peaceful Life", tells the story of USAMRIID microbiologist and epidemiologist Dr. Lisa E. Hensley, who was originally recruited to do Ebola work. A January 2000 accident in the AA4 "Hot Suite" that Hensley experienced, along with the protocols that followed it, is described. The efforts of USAMRIID scientists to get approval to do smallpox research on animals is described including the FDA's "animal efficacy rule" and the WHO General Assembly's provisional permission to do research for three years (1999–2002). A "Monkey Cabinet" is designed at USAMRIID and CDC for use in the possible investigation of the question of whether animals can be infected with smallpox. The development of a lethal, genetically engineered mousepox virus (the Jackson-Ramshaw virus) and its implications for bioterrorism are described. The "awakening" of the smallpox at the CDC's MCF West in 2001 by US Army investigators to induce smallpox disease in monkeys for the first time is dramatically recounted.
- Section 6, "The Demon's Eyes", continues the story of the induction of smallpox disease in monkeys at the CDC in 2001. It was determined that the Harper strain of smallpox kills monkeys slowly while the India strain kills them quickly. This was the first time that smallpox had ever been shown capable of infecting non-humans. Of eight monkeys infected, seven died—six of hemorrhagic smallpox and one of the classic pustular type. There follows a discussion of the need and justification for animal-use smallpox experiments. The emergency evacuation of the Army workers in the MCF West on 9/11 is described.
- Section 7, "The Anthrax Skulls", relates the atmosphere at the Department of Health and Human Services and their actions at the time of the 9/11 attacks. The story of the Amerithrax investigations is picked up again in day-by-day detail for the period 16 to 25 October 2001. The response by the FBI, HHS, DOJ, CIA and the White House are detailed. Actions at USAMRIID and USAMRMC are also described. USAMRIID became the FBI's reference lab for forensic evidence related to the bioterror incident. The events leading to Dr. Steven Hatfill becoming a DOJ "person of interest" are related. The indignation of Alfred Sommer, dean of the Johns Hopkins School of Public Health, at the news of the Army animal smallpox experiments is described as well as a reiteration of DA Henderson's opposition to the same.
- Section 8, "Superpox", begins with a description of an attempt at replication of the Jackson-Ramshaw virus at a lab at the Saint Louis University School of Medicine by Mark Buller working for USAMRIID. The potential for a similarly engineered "super-smallpox" virus for use by a terrorist is examined. The procedure for the transfection of an interleukin-4 gene into a mousepox virus is described. An unusual artifact—the preserved arm of a three- or four-year-old child with classic smallpox lesions, discovered in 1999 and now housed at USAMRIID—is described. This leads the author to muse that "the dream of the total eradication had failed", because although we could eradicate smallpox from nature, "we could not uproot the virus from the human heart".

== Reception ==
Most critics enjoyed Preston's storytelling techniques, often describing the book as suspenseful and frightening. Michiko Kakutani of The New York Times bragged that "this book will give you nightmares", deeming it engaging but also overly dramatic at times. Publishers Weekly described it as scarier than any thriller. Kirkus Reviews praised Preston's "steady, ominous voice". Daniel Fierman, writing for Entertainment Weekly, called the book a "ripping real-life horror story."

Chip Walter of the Pittsburgh Post-Gazette likened Preston's prose to telling scary stories over a campfire. The Economist called the book "fascinating", "gripping", and "always entertaining", though it said Preston's attempts to add more details sometimes hurt pacing. Kevin Shapiro of Commentary found it easy to read, and while he felt that the book was "formulaic", he considered it only a minor shortcoming. In contrast, Bryan Appleyard of The Times characterized the book as style over substance, calling Preston a "master of...cinematic journalese."

Many reporters and writers criticized Preston's decision to discuss both smallpox and anthrax in the same book. Appleyard described the jumps between the two subjects as "sketchy" and "hugely irritating". Fierman felt that the book's overarching narrative structure was "klutzy". Walter called the book "disjointed", though he felt that was ultimately a minor issue. Kakutani argued that cutting back and forth between accounts of the anthrax attacks and descriptions of smallpox was manipulative and constituted scaremongering.
