= Long Hello and Short Goodbye =

1999 film

- Theatrical release poster
- Directed by: Rainer Kaufmann
- Written by: Jeff Vintar; Martin Rauhaus
- Produced by: Andre Fahning; Henrik Meyer
- Starring: Nicolette Krebitz; Marc Hosemann; Katja Riemann
- Cinematography: Klaus Eichhammer
- Edited by: Ueli Christen
- Music by: Marco Meister
- Production company: Letterbox Filmproduktion
- Distributed by: Warner Bros.
- Release date: 15 July 1999
- Running time: 95 minutes
- Country: Germany
- Language: German

Long Hello and Short Goodbye is a 1999 German neo-noir crime film directed by Rainer Kaufmann, produced by Studio Hamburg Letterbox Filmproduktion and co-authored by Jeff Vintar and Martin Rauhaus.

== Plot summary ==
The film revolves around a recently released safe-cracker named Ben and an undercover police agent named Melody. Melody's job is to dupe Ben into another job so that he can be put away once more by her sinister and ambitious boss Kahnitz. But complications arise when the talkative cop falls for the taciturn gangster.

The film features a complex neo-noir flashback structure that centers on seemingly dead characters littering the bloody floor of a fancy apartment. As the story progresses, we find out that some of these dead people are not dead at all, more are hiding in the closet, and slowly the pieces of the puzzle come together.

== Cast ==
- Nicolette Krebitz as Melody
- Marc Hosemann as Ben
- Sunnyi Melles as Aurelia
- Axel Milberg as Percy
- Dietrich Hollinderbäumer as Kahnitz
- Martin Glade as Dennis
- Katja Riemann as Ida
- Hannelore Hoger as Therapeutin/Therapist
- Stefan Kurt as Arzt/Doctor
- Albert Kitzl as Dealer
- Gustav Peter Wöhler as Verkäufer/Salesman
- Michael Benthin as Rezeptionist/Receptionist
- Eva Kryll as Sachbearbeiterin/Case Worker
- Jimmy Yassa-Campos as Tresenmann/Barkeeper
- Atto Suttarp as Pizzamann/Pizza Man

== Production history ==
Based on an original English-language screenplay by I, Robot writer Jeff Vintar, the English-language version of Vintar's screenplay struggled to reach the screen for many years. The work was under a variety of producers and production companies; hence, the script was under option for a very long time. At one time, Gustavo Mosquera, who had directed Moebius, was slated as its director, with John Woo and partner Terence Chang producing under their Lion Rock banner.

The screenplay that eventually made it to the screen was developed by the production company Circle of Confusion. Shortly before the movie's release, the film's producers re-edited the film to give it a linear narrative, which became the version that made it to the screen.

== Critical reception ==
The film became a cult favorite among noir buffs, and received a positive review in Variety that predicted that the film would play in broad-minded festivals around the world, and that genre fans would "lap it up".

The final editing that gave the film its linear narrative is said to have diluted its "effect", which resulted in its polarizing critics and audience members alike.
