= First Light (Preston book) =

Book on astronomy and astronomers

First Light: The Search for the Edge of the Universe
- First edition
- Author: Richard Preston
- Language: English
- Subject: Astronomy
- Genre: Non-fiction
- Publisher: Atlantic Monthly Press
- Publication date: 1 November 1987
- ISBN: 9780871132000

First Light: The Search for the Edge of the Universe is a 1987 non-fiction book on astronomy and astronomers by Richard Preston.

The title refers to the astronomical term first light, which is when a telescope is first used to take an astronomical image after it has been constructed. First light also refers to the moment when stars and galaxies first formed out of a dark universe.

== Content ==
The central character of First Light is the Hale Telescope on Palomar Mountain, which was the world's biggest telescope for more than three decades. Preston describes its history and technical details, and he profiles many of the people involved in astronomical research at Palomar. First Light portrays astronomers scanning the Solar System for minor planets and those seeking the outermost astronomical objects in universe. It describes historical events such as the discovery of quasars and celebrates the scientists' joy in their endeavors, their obsessions and even their thoughts.

== Structure ==
The book is structured as follows.

- Foreword: To Readers and Teachers
- Part 1: Big Eye
- Part 2: The Shoemaker Comets
- Part 3: Gadgeteers
- Part 4: Discoveries
- (List of) Main Characters
- Glossary
- Credits

First Light provides neither an index nor a bibliography.

== Criticism ==
As of today, some of the astronomical approaches and views are out of date. However, First Light is considered one of the best books written about astronomers.

== Awards ==
- First Light won the 1988 American Institute of Physics award in science writing.
- Carolyn Shoemaker, who was a subject of First Light, named an asteroid 3792 Preston.

== See also ==
- List of asteroids/3701–3800
