= C. J. Peters =

American virologist

Clarence James Peters, Jr (born September 23, 1940, Midland, Texas) was a physician, field virologist and former U.S. Army colonel. He was noted for his efforts in trying to stem epidemics of exotic infectious diseases such as the Ebola virus, Hanta virus and Rift Valley fever (RVF). He was an eminent authority on the virology, pathogenesis and epidemiology of hemorrhagic fever viruses.

== Biography ==
Peters grew up in Odessa, Texas. At Rice University, he initially majored in chemical engineering, but switched to chemistry his junior year after taking courses with Thomas Brackett. He obtained his medical degree at Johns Hopkins School of Medicine and served his residency in internal medicine at the University of Texas Southwestern Medical School. He developed an interest in tropical medicine and virology while serving five years as a research associate at the National Institute of Allergy and Infectious Disease intramural laboratory in Panama. Upon returning Stateside, he completed his fellowship in immunology at the Scripps Clinic and Research Foundation.

He entered active duty in the U.S. Army and from 1977 through 1992 held several positions at the U.S. Army Medical Research Institute of Infectious Diseases (USAMRIID), Fort Detrick, Maryland, where he worked on biodefense and hazardous virus research. His positions there ranged from research scientist and Medical Division chief to Disease Assessment Division chief. He led the team that controlled a 1989 Ebola introduction into a monkey facility in Reston, Virginia (a story recounted in Richard Preston’s best-selling 1994 book The Hot Zone).

From 1992 to 2000 Peters was head of the Special Pathogens Branch at the Centers for Disease Control where he investigated hazardous emerging viruses. These included the agent causing the new disease hantavirus pulmonary syndrome in the southwestern US, which he discovered and named. He also led efforts in Africa (Ebola, Marburg, Lassa, Rift Valley fever), Asia (Nipah virus in Malaysia), and South America (Bolivian hemorrhagic fever, hantavirus pulmonary syndrome, Venezuelan equine encephalitis) to control outbreaks.

Since 2000, Peters has been the John Sealy Distinguished University Professor of Tropical and Emerging Virology at the University of Texas Medical Branch (UTMB) at Galveston, where he has an active research program in SARS, Rift Valley fever, and other human pathogens. He is a professor in the department of pathology and in the department of microbiology and immunology. He is a member of the World Health Organization Collaborating Center for Tropical Diseases. He is also director for biodefense at the UTMB Center for Biodefense and Emerging Infectious Diseases.

Peters has published more than 300 papers on research and control of viral diseases including more than 70 publications on Rift Valley fever virus and more than 60 publications on arenaviruses. He has served on numerous committees dealing with disease problems worldwide and has been called back as a consultant to CDC and USAMRIID on influenza, vaccines, and other issues after his departure. He consulted with Taiwan on SARS control.

== Current work ==
Most of Peters' current work in the laboratory dealt with Bunyaviridae (including the phylogeny of phleboviruses such as Rift Valley fever (RVF), Arenaviridae (Lassa fever, South American hemorrhagic fevers) and SARS CoV. He ran an active program of human and animal vaccine development for RVF using reverse genetics. He and his colleague Ilya Frolov developed alphavirus replicon vectored RVF vaccines for use in livestock and ultimately in humans. His arenavirus research concentrated on the effects of infection on cellular function, particularly those molecular interactions related to vascular permeability. SARS-CoV work includes antiviral drug development, model characterization, and interferon interactions. The Galveston National Laboratory, a Biosafety Level 4 laboratory, opened in 2008 at the University of Texas Medical Branch to allow scientists there to work safely with any pathologic agent. Peters expected to transition some projects to higher hazard viral hemorrhagic fevers and to develop projects on other viruses such as tick-borne flaviviruses, highly virulent avian influenza strains, and Nipah virus, a new, highly virulent paramyxovirus.
