= James V. Hart =

American screenwriter and author (born 1947)

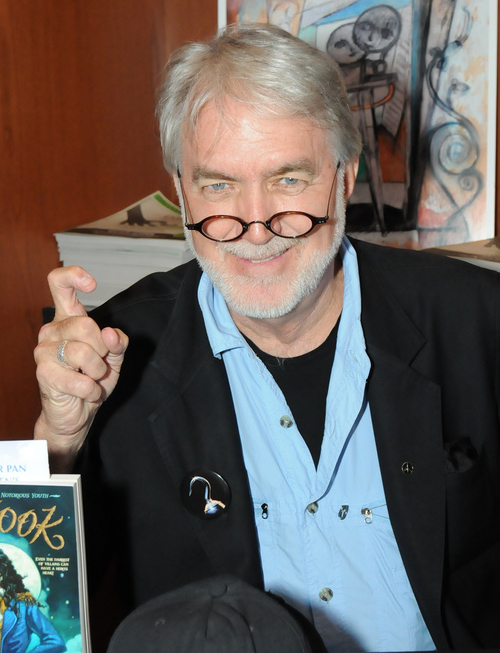
- Hart in 2011
- Born: 1947 (age 78–79); Fort Worth, Texas, U.S.
- Occupations: Screenwriter; author
- Spouse: Judith Nugent
- Children: 2; including Julia Hart
- Writing career
- Years active: 1984–present

James V. Hart (born 1947) is an American screenwriter and author. He is known for his literary adaptations, such as Hook (1991), Bram Stoker's Dracula (1992) and Mary Shelley's Frankenstein (1994).

== Career ==
=== Writing ===
Hart wrote the screenplay to the Steven Spielberg feature film Hook which functioned as a sequel to J. M. Barrie's original story, with Peter Pan having grown into adulthood. Later, he wrote the 2005 children's novel Capt. Hook: The Adventures of a Notorious Youth, a prequel depicting the youth of Captain Hook, the nemesis of Peter Pan. He wrote the Francis Ford Coppola-produced horror films Bram Stoker's Dracula (1992) and Mary Shelley's Frankenstein (1994).

Hart's writing focuses on adventure and fantasy fare, such as Muppet Treasure Island (1996), Lara Croft: Tomb Raider – The Cradle of Life (2003), and Epic (2013). He co-created the pirate television drama Crossbones with Luther writer Neil Cross based on Colin Woodard's book The Republic of Pirates. On July 24, 2014, NBC announced that Crossbones had been canceled after one season.

=== Unmade screenplays ===
Hart wrote the first draft screenplay of Atlas Shrugged, which was to be fully developed by director Randall Wallace. Hart also wrote an adaptation of The Sirens of Titan, which Kurt Vonnegut approved of before he died, as well as a screenplay adaptation for Crisis in the Hot Zone which was later adapted into a television series in 2019. In 2012, it was announced that TNT would create a television series based on the Dean Koontz's Frankenstein novels.

=== Teaching ===
Hart has been a faculty member of the Columbia University Graduate Film program and has mentored for Sundance Film Labs, the Austin Writer's Ranch, and the Equinoxe-Europe Writing Workshops.

== Personal life ==
Hart is the son of Albert Hart and Alice Hart. He has one brother, David (deceased). He studied film and graduated from Southern Methodist University in 1969. He lives in New York with his wife Judith. Their two children, Jake and Julia, are also screenwriters.

== Filmography ==
=== Film ===
Year	Title	Writer	Producer
1974	Dirty O'Neil	No	Associate
1977	The Ransom	No	Yes
1984	Gimme an 'F'	Yes	No
1991	Hook	Yes	Executive
1992	Bram Stoker's Dracula	Yes	Co-producer
1994	Mary Shelley's Frankenstein	No	Yes
1996	Muppet Treasure Island	Yes	No
1997	Contact	Yes	No
2002	Tuck Everlasting	Yes	No
2003	Lara Croft: Tomb Raider – The Cradle of Life	Story	No
2005	Sahara	Yes	No
2007	The Last Mimzy	Yes	No
2007	August Rush	Yes	No
2013	Epic	Yes	Executive

Additional literary material

- The Last Voyage of the Demeter (2023)

=== Television ===
Year	Title	Writer	Creator	Executive producer
2001	Jack and the Beanstalk: The Real Story	Yes	No	No
2014	Crossbones	Yes	Yes	No
2019–21	The Hot Zone	Yes	Yes	Yes
