= Too Good to Be Forgotten =

1998 memoir by David Obst

Too Good To Be Forgotten: Changing America in the '60s and '70s
- Author: David Obst
- Language: English
- Genre: Memoir
- Publisher: John Wiley & Sons
- Publication date: 1998
- Publication place: United States

Too Good To Be Forgotten: Changing America in the '60s and '70s is a 1998 memoir by David Obst, published by John Wiley & Sons.

It is Obst's account of the 1960s and the 1970s. Book segments include Obst's childhood, his studies and travels, and his interactions with historically significant political figures during the subject decades.

The start of each chapter includes the list of the subject year's popular films, television, and record albums. Alex Kyczynski of The New York Times argued that the inclusion of the lists was a "waste" of space.

== Reception ==
Jamie Stiehm of The Baltimore Sun wrote that the book "succeeds in his mission of breathing life into a series of snapshots of his youth and capturing the tempo of the times".

Kyczynski wrote that the book had "painfully didactic prose" and that it was "a pretty lackluster tribute to the baby boomer generation."
