= Kitum Cave =

Cave in Kenya

Coordinates: 1.0491°N 34.5802°E

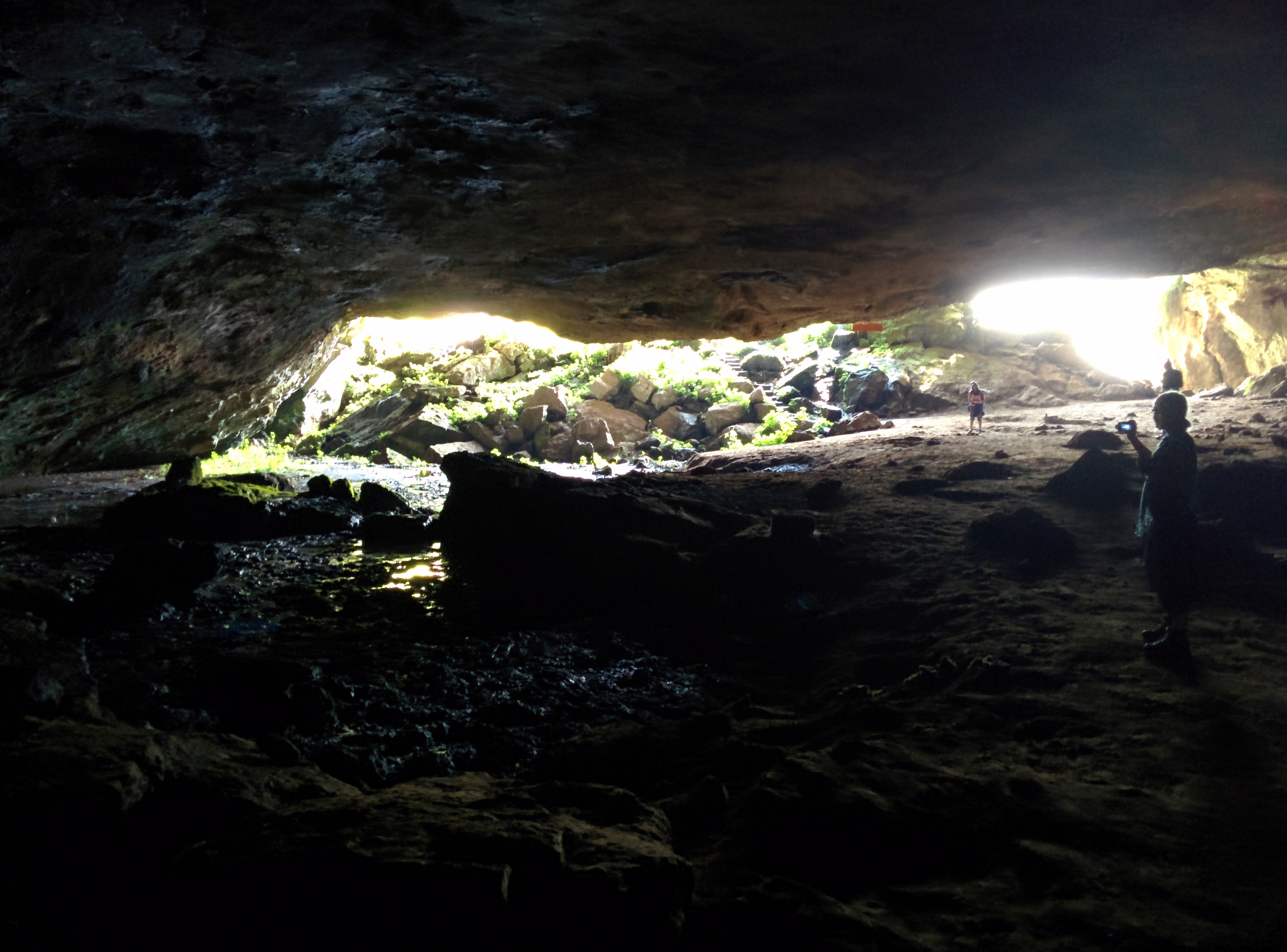
- Interactive map of Kitum Cave
- Location: Mount Elgon National Park, Kenya
- Depth: 700–900 m (2,300–3,000 ft)
- Length: ~ 200 metres (700 ft)
- Geology: Pyroclastic (volcanic, non-solutional)
- Entrances: 1
- Access: Public land; Access generally uncontrolled

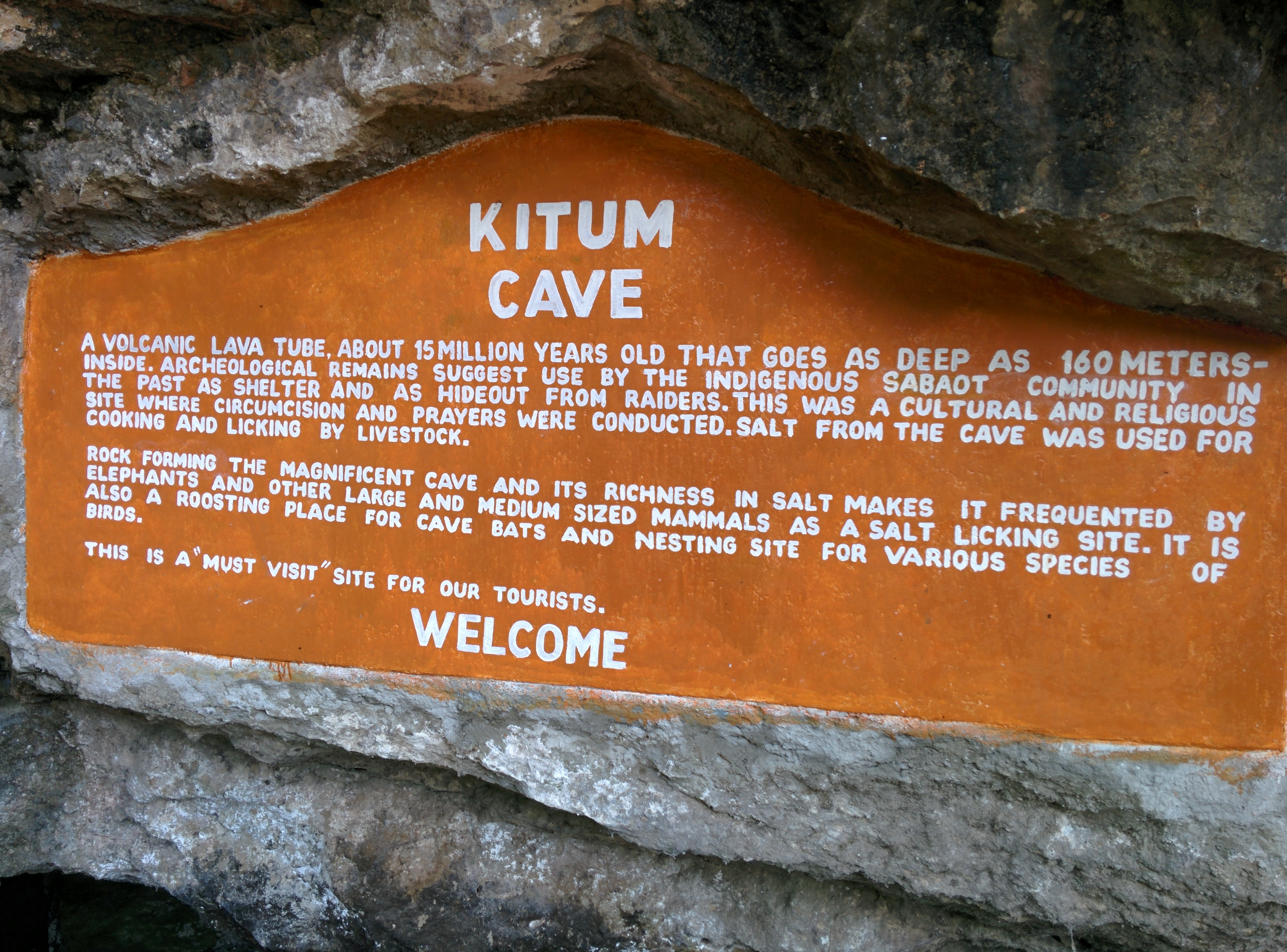
Kitum Cave.

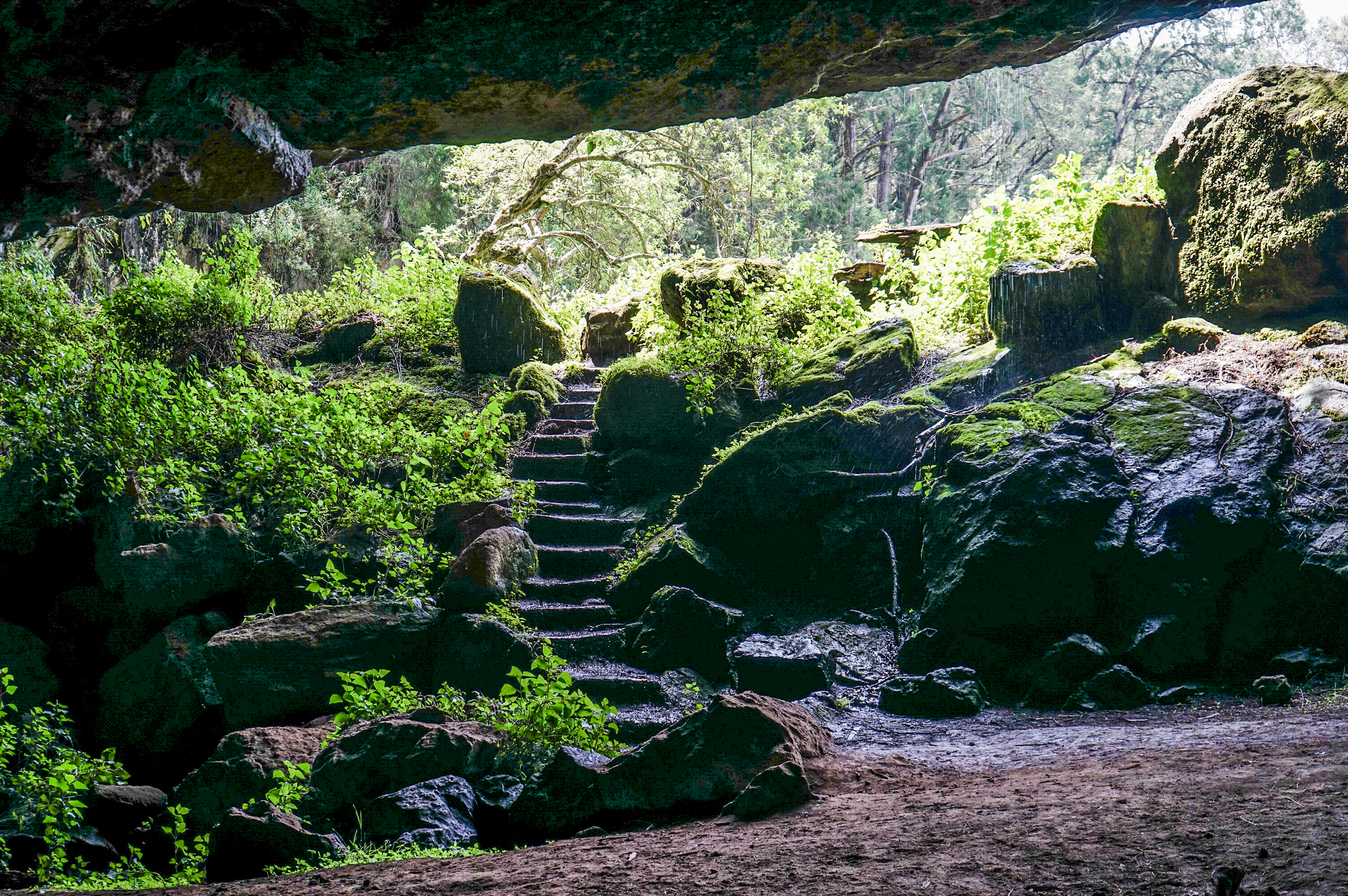
Kitum Cave, entrance

Kitum Cave is located in Mount Elgon National Park, Kenya. It is one of five named "elephant caves" of Mount Elgon where animals, including elephants, "mine" the rock for its sodium-rich salts. In the 1980s, two European visitors contracted Marburg virus disease there.

== Description ==
Kitum Cave is a non-solutional cave developed in pyroclastic volcanic rocks, not, as some have presumed, a lava tube. It extends about 200 metres (700 ft) into the side of Mount Elgon near the Kenyan border with Uganda. The walls are rich in salt, and animals such as elephants have gone deep into the cave for centuries in search of salt. The elephants use their tusks to break off pieces of the cave wall that they then chew and swallow, leaving the walls scratched and furrowed. Their actions have likely enlarged the cave over time.

Other animals including bushbuck, buffalo and hyenas come to Kitum Cave to consume salt left by the elephants. Bat guano from fruit-eating and insectivorous bats can be found deeper in the cave. There is also a deep crevasse into which young elephants have fallen and died.

== Marburg virus ==
In the 1980s, two visitors to the cave contracted Marburg virus disease. In 1980, a French man died from the disease after visiting the cave. In 1987, a Danish boy who lived in Kenya also fell ill and died after visiting the cave. Two different but very similar viruses have been catalogued from these infections: the 1980 virus is named after a doctor, Shem Musoke, who survived being infected by the French patient, while the 1987 virus is named Ravn, after the last name of the Danish patient.

Based on these cases, an expedition was staged by the United States Army Medical Research Institute of Infectious Disease (USAMRIID) in an attempt to identify the vector species presumably residing in the cave. Despite sampling a wide variety of species, including fruit bats, no Marburg disease-causing viruses were found and the animal vector remained a mystery. These events were dramatized by Richard Preston in the best-selling book The Hot Zone (1994).

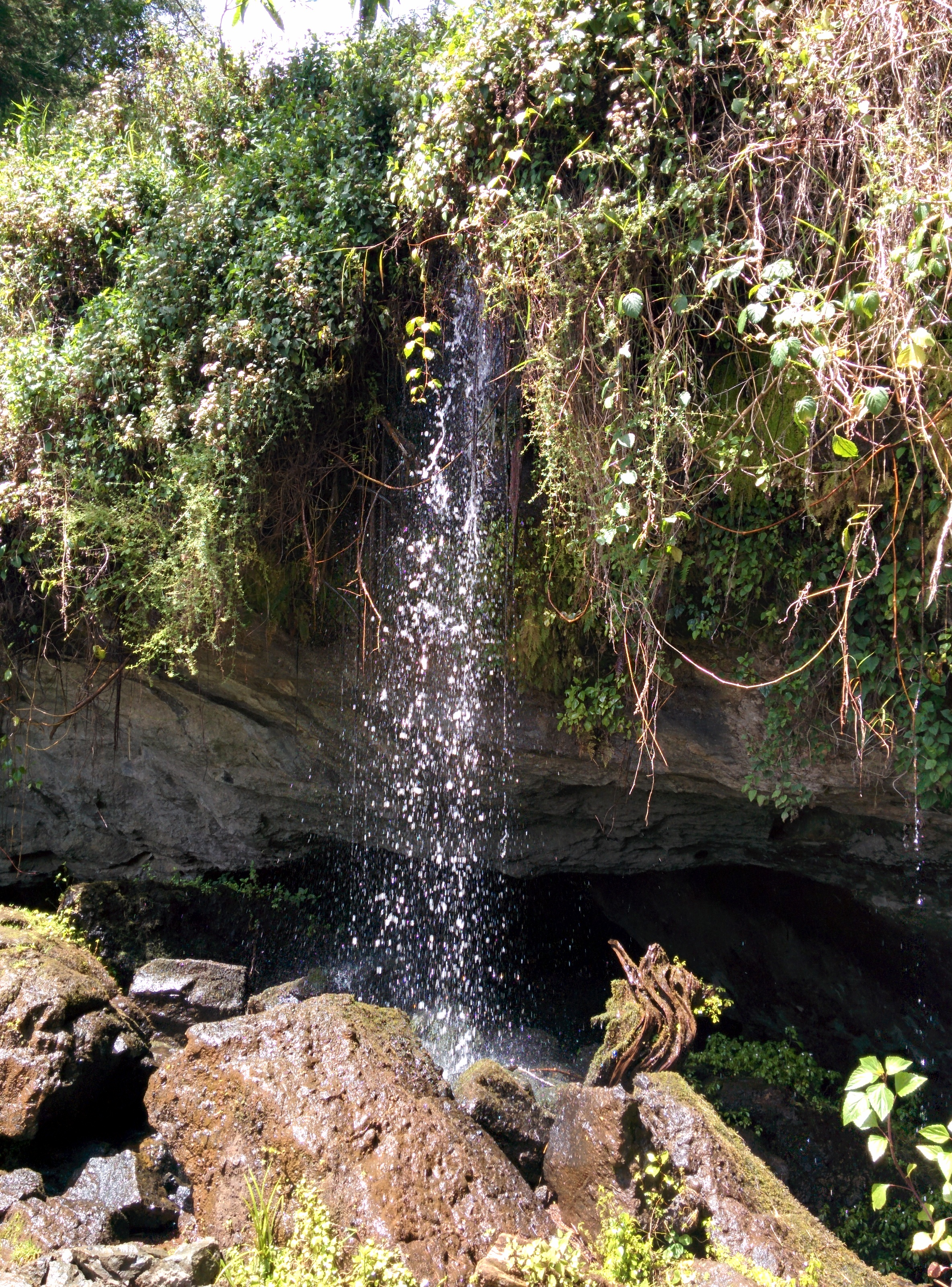
Kitum Cave Falls

In September 2007, similar expeditions to active mines in Gabon and Uganda found solid evidence of reservoirs of Marburg disease-causing virus in cave-dwelling Egyptian fruit bats. The Ugandan mines both had colonies of the same species of African fruit bats that colonize Kitum Cave, suggesting that the long-sought vector at Kitum was indeed the bats and their guano. The study was conducted after two mine workers contracted Marburg virus disease in August 2007, both without being bitten by any bats, suggesting that the virus may be propagated through inhalation of powdered guano.
