= David Obst =

American literary agent and author

- Born: 1946 (age 79–80); Culver City, California
- Education: University of California, Berkeley
- Occupations: Author, Literary Agent
- Spouse: Lynda Obst (divorced.)
- Writing career
- Notable work: Too Good to Be Forgotten

David Obst is an American literary agent and author. Obst was the agent of Carl Bernstein and Bob Woodward. He also was involved in the productions of the films Revenge of the Nerds, Fast Times at Ridgemont High, and All the President's Men.

== Early life ==
According to Alex Kyczynski of The New York Times, Obst says he was born in 1946, in Culver City, California. He attended the University of California, Berkeley.

== Career ==
Around 1969 Obst went to Taiwan to study the Chinese language and later moved to Washington, DC where he became Seymour Hersh's literary agent. Obst had also associated with activist Abbie Hoffman. Obst wrote the memoir Too Good To Be Forgotten: Changing America in the '60s and '70s, which was published in 1998. In a review of the book, Hersh stated that Obst was "in the middle of" important political movements in the 1960s and 1970s. By 1977 Obst had about 50 clients. Obst was an anti-Vietnam war activist and was able to avoid being drafted into the Vietnam War by the Culver City draft board by stating that, "They could throw me (Obst) in jail or let me do something useful with my life."

On 1 February 1977 an article was published in the New York Magazine by Matthew Klein, stating that "David Obst, superagent, becomes David Obst, publisher, with a family attachment to Random House. Obst stated that he had less success as a publisher compared to being an agent. He did however publish a series of books called Roadfood, a guide to highway restaurants.

In 1998 Obst further explained the idea Deep Throat was non-existent in a New York Times interview (this was originally revealed in Obst's memoir Too Good To Be Forgotten).

In 2025, he wrote Saving ourselves from Big Car where he contends that the motor vehicle industry (which he refers to as Big Car) has been responsible for the loss of human life and other global issues.

== Personal life ==
Obst married and later divorced Lynda Obst. From 1986 to 1990 he was married to Rachael Worby. In 1990 he began dating his future wife, Jane Gottleib. As of 2022 he lived in Santa Barbara, California.

== Publications ==
- — (1998). Too Good to Be Forgotten: Changing America in the '60s and '70s. John Wiley & Sons.
