= The Cobra Event =

1998 thriller novel by Richard Preston

- First edition
- Author: Richard Preston
- Language: English
- Genre: Thriller
- Publisher: Random House
- Publication date: 1998
- Publication place: United States
- Media type: Print (hardback & paperback)
- Pages: 432 pp
- ISBN: 0-345-40997-3
- OCLC: 39891952

The Cobra Event is a 1998 thriller novel by Richard Preston describing an attempted bioterrorism attack on the United States. The perpetrator of the attack has genetically engineered a virus, called "Cobra", that fuses the incurable and highly contagious common cold with one of the world's most virulent diseases, smallpox. The disease that results from the virus, brainpox, has symptoms that mimic those of Lesch–Nyhan syndrome and the common cold. The book is divided between descriptions of the virus and the government's attempt to stop the imminent threat posed by it.

== Plot summary ==
The book is divided into six sections. The first section, called "Trial", starts with a teenaged girl named Kate Moran who dies violently one day in school. The next section, titled "1969", describes tests done in the 1960s by the U.S. government involving weaponized viruses. The third section, "Diagnosis", describes the autopsy of Kate Moran and introduces the key characters of Dr. Alice Austen, Mark Littleberry, and Will Hopkins. The last three sections—"Decision", "Reachdeep", and "The Operation"—describe these three characters' journeys to discover the source of the lethal Cobra virus.

== "Cobra" and its effects ==
The virus described in the novel is a fictional chimera that attacks the human brain. The infective agent, code-named "Cobra" by the protagonists, is a recombinant virus made from modified variants of the nuclear polyhedrosis virus (which normally infects moths and butterflies), rhinovirus, and smallpox.

The infection initially presents common cold-like symptoms and a characteristic blistering process in the nose and mouth, before invading the nervous system. Although not as contagious as the influenza virus, it spreads rapidly through the same vectors as the common cold, mainly via airborne particulate matter coming in contact with the mucous membranes of the respiratory system. Although tussis is the primary source of these particles, the inclusion of nuclear polyhedrosis virus allows Cobra to form crystals, which can be easily processed into a fine powder. This powder is used as a delivery mechanism in the novel's terrorist attacks.

The optic nerves of the eye, accessed through the eyelid, and olfactory nerves of the nose provide a direct pathway for the neurotropic Cobra virus to spread to the central nervous system, where the virus takes root. Once present in brain matter, the virus begins to replicate exponentially. Infected brain cells experience growth of viral crystals in their nuclei, eventually leading to lysis of the cell. The brain stem, which controls the basic functions of life, is heavily affected by this growth. The Cobra virus also knocks out the gene for the enzyme hypoxanthine-guanine phosphoribosyltransferase, whose absence causes Lesch–Nyhan syndrome. As a result, patients experience both autocannibalistic urges and increased aggression toward others. These neurological symptoms develop within a matter of hours, eventually resulting in death due to the severe damage to the brain stem. Cobra is so aggressive in its growth that autopsies reveal a brain almost liquefied by cell lysis. Cobra is shown to have a case fatality rate of almost 98%, with only one survivor out of 43 people infected.

== Impact of the book ==
President Bill Clinton was reportedly sufficiently impressed by the scenarios described in the book that he asked aides and officials for closer study and suggested more funding for research into bioterrorism threats. However, some variation exists in the assorted accounts of this episode in his administration, about his degree of concern, who was asked to help, the depth of inquiry, the formal status of his orders, and the magnitude of expense involved.
