= Lisa Hensley (microbiologist) =

American microbiologist

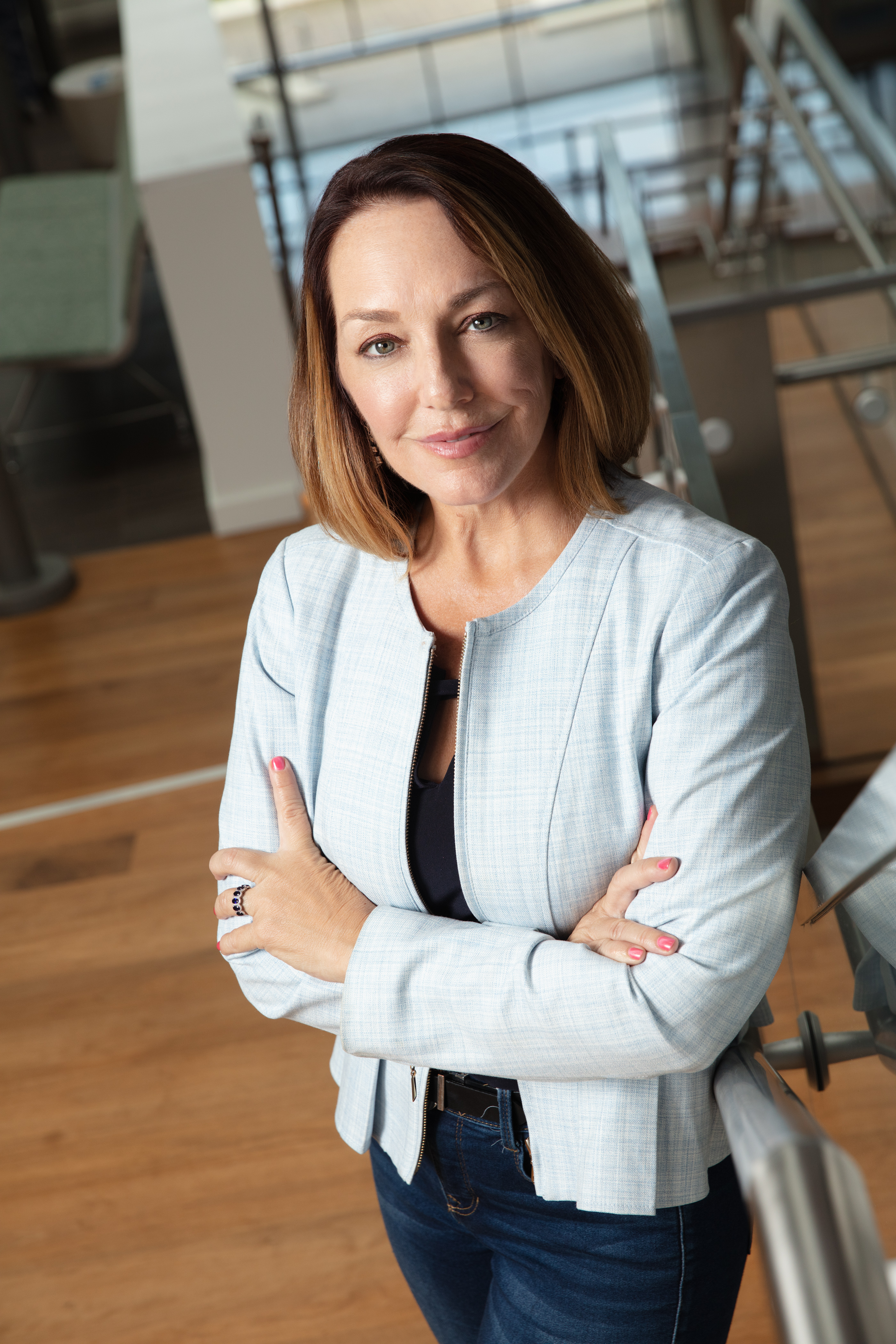
Dr. Lisa E. Hensley at NBAF. Manhattan, Kansas

Lisa Ellen Hensley, PhD, MSPH is a distinguished American research scientist and leader in the field of emerging infectious diseases and biodefense. She is currently the Research Lead for the Zoonotic and Emerging Disease Research Unit (ZEDRU) at the National Bio and Agro-Defense Facility operated by the United States Department of Agriculture (USDA). Her work focuses on high-consequence zoonotic and emerging pathogens, often conducted at Biosafety level 4 (BSL-4), the highest level of biocontainment. She is widely regarded as a global expert on emerging infectious diseases and medical countermeasure development, with experience spanning basic research through preclinical testing and into clinical trial implementation.

Early Life and Education

Born in Winston-Salem, North Carolina, Lisa Hensley grew up on the east coast, residing in North Carolina, Maryland, Pennsylvania, and New Jersey. Hensley initially gravitated towards science, particularly finding herself drawn to the lab where patient cultures were analyzed in her fathers pediatriac practice in Myrtle Beach South Carolina.

A pivotal moment in her career path occurred in the early 1990s when, as a college student, she attended an HIV/AIDS conference with her father. Her father has a mild to moderate form of Haemophilia, and in that era, hemophiliacs who received blood transfusions were at high risk of contracting HIV. Fortunately, her father was never infected. This experience, coupled with seeing the suffering of AIDS patients and the profound impact on a generation of hemophiliacs due to contaminated blood products, inspired her to dedicate her career to viral research to get ahead of future epidemics. This "moment of impact" ultimately veered her career path toward research, leading her to pursue graduate studies in epidemiology.

She has strong connections to Maryland, having attended Centennial High School (Maryland) in Howard County before transferring to Blair Academy (Blairstown NJ). Hensley's academic background includes:

• Johns Hopkins University (1990–1994):

◦ Bachelor of Science (B.S.) in Natural Science and Public Health.

◦ Master of Health Science (M.H.S.) in Immunology and Infectious Disease. She completed both degrees in just four years.

◦ During her time at Johns Hopkins, she was an All-American goalie on the Women's Lacrosse Team, and still holds the record for both single season save percentage (1992, 1994) and career save percentage (0.634).

• University of North Carolina at Chapel Hill (1994–1997):

◦ Doctor of Philosophy (Ph.D.) in Epidemiology/Microbiology, with Ralph S. Baric as her advisor. Epidemiology explores diseases in large populations and seeks the source and cause of infectious disease epidemics.

◦ Master of Science in Public Health (M.S.P.H.) in Epidemiology/Microbiology.

• MIT Sloan School of Management (2001): Executive Leadership Certificate.

Career

Dr. Hensley has held several significant leadership roles throughout her career:

• Research Lead and Distinguished Senior Research Scientist, Zoonotic and Emerging Disease Research Unit, USDA National Bio- and Agro-Defense Facility (NBAF) (2022–Present). In this role, she established and leads a high-consequence zoonotic disease research unit at a premier U.S. federal biosecurity lab, and directed the operational stand-up of BSL-4 facilities. She chose this position due to concerns about food security, recognizing the growing problem of increasing food prices and the potential impact of animal-to-human virus spillover and spillback and the risk to US famers and national security from both natural occurrences of zoonotic pathogens and intentional misuse. Her current work at NBAF primarily focuses on Nipah virus and Crimean Congo Hemorrhagic fever virus.

• Associate Director for Science, National Institute of Allergy and Infectious Diseases Integrated Research Facility (IRF) in Frederick, Maryland (2013–2022). She was recruited to this unique research laboratory by Dr. Peter Jahrling. She directed high-containment research for pandemic and zoonotic threats and developed translational programs for countermeasures against Ebola, Mpox, and SARS-CoV-2 that advanced to clinical trials.

• Director of Regulatory Science, Food and Drug Administration Office of the Chief Scientist (2012–2013). She coordinated national regulatory readiness policy for emerging threats and public health emergencies, and supported the development of policy for evidence-based decision-making for the licensure of novel biologics and vaccines.

• Chief of Viral Therapeutics, United States Army Medical Research Institute of Infectious Diseases (USAMRIID) (2008–2012). She led federal Department of Defense research efforts on high-risk viral pathogens, including filoviruses and arenaviruses, and oversaw clinical translation and advanced manufacturing partnerships for BSL-4 therapeutic candidates. She built up USAMRIID's program to receive $12 million in annual grants and managed 30 researchers.

Research and Expertise

Dr. Hensley has an extensive background in public health. Her formal training is in virology and epidemiology, with a focus on emerging and re-emerging biodefense infections, biodefense, and biosecurity. She possesses experience in preclinical and clinical studies, regulatory science, outbreak response, identification of novel or emerging pathogens, and the development of diagnostics, treatments, and prevention strategies. She is noted as one of the few scientists with experience spanning research from preclinical stages through clinical trials.

Over 25 years, she has dedicated her work to developing and characterizing animal models for numerous high-threat pathogens, including Ebola, Marburg, SARS, MERS, Smallpox (Varioloa virus), and Mpox (formerly monkeypox). These models have been crucial for the development and evaluation of candidate medical countermeasures such as vaccines, therapeutics, diagnostics, and post-exposure prophylaxes. Her hands-on experience includes working with various high-consequence pathogens like filoviruses, orthopoxviruses, coronaviruses, bunyaviruses, henipaviruses, and arenaviruses.

She also has significant experience working in austere and resource-limited settings, particularly across West and Central Africa (including Liberia, Mali, Sierra Leone, Guinea, and the Democratic Republic of Congo), where she helped establish field laboratories, supported outbreak responses, and led clinical trials under challenging conditions.

Key Contributions and Experiences

During the 2014 Ebola outbreak in West Africa, Hensley was at the forefront of the fight. She made six trips to Liberia in 2014, witnessing the progression of the epidemic firsthand, from initial disbelief to widespread panic, and finally, a return to normalcy. She alongside colleagues provided critical training for Liberian health workers and performed daily tests of blood samples from suspected Ebola patients, emphasizing the importance of diagnostics for identifying infected and deceased individuals. As the outbreak waned Hensley focused her efforts supporting clinical trials and the establishment of the Partnership for Research on Vaccines and Infectious Diseases in Liberia (PREVAIL) network in Liberia and later the Pamoja Tulinde Maisha (PALM) (“Together Save Lives” in the Kiswahili language) program in partnership with Institut National pour la Recherche Biomedicale (INRB) in the Democratic Republic of the Congo. Eventually these trials led to the approval of the first vaccines and treatments for Ebola virus disease.

Hensley emphasizes that her work in Africa and at the IRF is a team effort, involving various U.S. public health agencies, the World Health Organization (WHO), African health ministries, non-governmental organizations, and private companies pursuing vaccines.

From the Ebola experience, she highlights key lessons for the global health community: the importance of surveillance (early detection), education, cultural sensitivity, and working humbly with people on the ground. She noted that mistakes were made due to arrogance and false assumptions by some health officials who initially believed the outbreak could be easily controlled. The experience also encouraged NIH to promote the sharing of negative data, an unnatural concept for researchers accustomed to publishing only successful studies.

Hensley is certified to work in BSL-4 facilities and describes the environment as similar to other labs, but with all sharp objects removed and the necessity of moving slower due to the positive pressure suit.

Hensley is the subject of a chapter in journalist Richard Preston's 2002 book Demon in the Freezer, which covers the history of smallpox eradication and the current debates over remaining smallpox stocks. In Chapter 5, "A Woman With a Peaceful Life", Preston recounts Hensley's beginnings as a researcher with USAMRIID and her eventual recruitment to the CDC to collaborate on smallpox research. Hensley was part of the team responsible for the first nonhuman smallpox infection (in monkeys), proving the potential for continued live-animal smallpox research. Some would argue that the experiment's success bolsters the argument of "retentionists", who oppose elimination of smallpox stores largely so that they can continue to be researched. Her work lead to the development of the first nonhuman primate models for Smallpox and MPOX and the development and approval of treatments for Smallpox.

Richard Preston featured Lisa Hensley prominently in his October 2014 New Yorker article about the Ebola outbreak and in his 2019 book, Crisis in the Red Zone, where she is depicted as a heroic figure who voluntarily traveled to West Africa to assist in the outbreak response. In Crisis in the Red Zone, Preston recounts her role in the efforts to treat American patients, notably Kent Brantly and Nancy Writebol, with the experimental drug ZMapp. Hensley provided clinical insights to Brantly, discussing various experimental treatments for Ebola and sharing her own experience with potential exposure. She advised Brantly that monkeys on the brink of death had shown rapid improvement after receiving ZMapp. Hensley volunteered to retrieve ZMapp for the missionaries via helicopter, the pilots flying through heavy rain and low to zero visibility for the humanitarian mission. The use of the experimental treatment played out in the international press with Dr. Brantly crediting the antibody cocktail with saving his life. Prior to his and Nancy Writbol's survival the Ebola Treatment unit in Monrovia had only a single survivor. The sensational story forced conversations on the use of experimental treatments during public health emergencies, opening the floodgates for clinical trials and the use of other products. Hensley expressed a profound sense of global responsibility, stating, "If you are walking by a lake and somebody is drowning, you can’t not try to save them. People are drowning in Ebola" and "If we don’t help, what message are we sending to our children?". As a single parent she argued that she had an even greater responsibility to set an example for her young son.

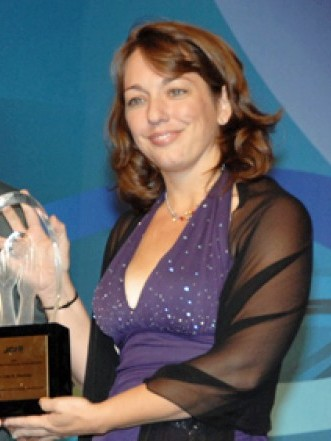
Hensley in 2008

In 2007, Hensley was recognized as one of the year's "Ten Outstanding Young Americans" (TOYA) by the United States Junior Chamber (Jaycees). The award honors Americans ages 18–40 who "exemplify the best attributes of the nation’s young people". In 2008, she was selected as one of the year's Ten Outstanding Young Persons of the world ("TOYP") by JCI (Junior Chamber International). Similar to the TOYA award, this program recognizes young people who excel in their chosen fields and exemplify the best attributes of the world's young people. She has also received the Eagleson Award, HHS Secretary's Award for COVID-19 Response (2022), NIH Director's Award (2020, 2015), NIAID Merit Award (2022, 2020, 2019, 2018, 2017, 2016, 2014), abd the Superior Civilian Service Award (2011).

Dr. Hensley is a prolific author with over 250 peer-reviewed publications and book chapters in leading journals such as Nature, Lancet Microbe, and J Infect Dis. Her scholarly impact is reflected in her H-index of 93 and i10-index of 222. She also holds multiple patents related to virology, one health, biodefense, and translational medicine. Her work has led to the development of medical countermeasures for multiple biothreat agents and emerging diseases including: Ebola, Marburg, MPOX, Lassa Fever, Smallpox, SARS and COVID-19.

== Works consulted ==
- Daddario-DiCaprio, Kathleen M. "Postexposure protection against Marburg haemorrhagic fever with recombinant vesicular stomatitis virus vectors in non-human primates: an efficacy assessment". The Lancet 367.9520 (2006): 1399–1404
- Civilian Personnel Online. “Army Civilians Profile of the Month: Oct 2007 Profile of the Month—Dr. Lisa Hensley.” Accessed 13 Jan 2014.
- Preston, Richard. Demon in the Freezer. New York, NY: Random House, 2002.
- https://www.washingtonpost.com/archive/politics/2005/10/02/a-teams-enduring-war-on-ebola/93a2d83b-2ca4-4107-aaa3-cd2781a360d0/
