= Peter Jahrling =

American virologist

- Education: Cornell Medical College
- Scientific career
- Workplaces: U.S. Army Medical Research Institute of Infectious Diseases; National Institute of Allergy and Infectious Diseases

Peter B. Jahrling is chief of the Emerging Viral Pathogens Section of the National Institute of Allergy and Infectious Diseases.

Jahrling received his PhD in medical microbiology from Cornell Medical College. He joined the military as an officer at the U.S. Army Medical Research Institute of Infectious Diseases (USAMRIID), and remained employed as a civilian after his service. Since 2005, Jahrling has been the chief scientist of the NIAID Integrated Research Facility in Frederick, Maryland, and chief of the Emerging Viral Pathogens Section.

His research focuses on the development of animal models for viruses infecting humans, strategies for vaccination and treatment of serious viral pathogens, and characterization of newly discovered viruses. He oversees BSL-4 labs at Fort Detrick.

The Hot Zone mentions Jahrling's early research in Ebola virus. He is portrayed in the first season of The Hot Zone television series by Topher Grace.

== Awards ==
- 2003 Elected fellow of the American Association for the Advancement of Science
- Secretary of Defense Medal for Meritorious Civilian Service
- Federal Career Service Outstanding Professional Award
- Department of the Army Achievement Medal for Civilian Service
- Order of Military Medical Merit
- Joel M. Dalrymple Award for Distinguished Medical Service, Association of Military Surgeons of the United States
- Lifetime Achievement Award for Excellence in Filovirus Research

== See also ==
- Lisa Hensley
