= Joseph B. McCormick =

American epidemiologist

Joseph B. McCormick (born October 16, 1942) is an American epidemiologist, physician, and academic.

== Early life and education ==
Joseph B. McCormick was born in Knoxville, Tennessee. His early years were spent on a farm in Indiana.

He attended Florida Southern College, graduating with degrees in chemistry and mathematics in 1964. He had a summer fellowship with the Institute of Nutrition of Central America and Panama, Guatemala. in 1969.

McCormick received a Master of Science from the Harvard School of Public Health in 1970. He had a summer followship in Haiti at the Rural Health Clinc in 1971. He attended Duke University School of Medicine, graduating in 1971. His residency and internship was at the Children's Hospital of Philadelphia under Dr. C. Everett Koop, from 1971 to 1973. He was a fellow in the Preventive Medicine Residency Program at the Centers for Disease Control and Prevention from 1975 and 1976.

Following graduation from college, McCormick went to Brussels, Belgium and attended the Alliance Francaise and the Free University for a year. He learned the French language to enable him to teach sciences and mathematics in a secondary school in Kinshasa, Congo.

== Career ==
While living in the Congo, McCormick worked in a local hospital and developed an interest in medicine, specifically tropical diseases. In 1974, following his residency training, he was appointed an Epidemic Intelligence Service Officer at the Centers for Disease Control and Prevention (CDC). He was the James H. Steele Professor of Epidemiology at the University of Texas Houston School of Public Health

He was appointed to the faculty of the Groupe d'Etudes de Virologie de Institute Pasteur from 1984 to 1990. In 1993, he was appointed professor and chairman of Community Health and Sciences at the Aga Khan University Medical School in Karachi, Pakistan. He established an epidemiology program, similar to the CDC. Later, he was a visiting scientist at the Scripps Clinic and Research Foundation, La Jolla, California, an adjunct professor at Emory University, and an adjunct professor at the University of North Carolina at Chapel Hill.

In 1997 he returned to France where he started epidemiology programs for the Institute Pasteur and Aventis Pasteur, the world's largest vaccine manufacturer. He was also a member of the scientific board of the Centre Internationale de Recherche Medical in Paris,

He became the assistant dean, University of Texas Health Science Center School of Public Health, at Brownsville campus on January 1, 2001. McCormick has over 200 scientific publications with co-authors from over twenty countries. He is the co-author with Fisher-Hoch of the book Level 4: Virus Hunters of the CDC.

== Milestones ==
McCormick studied patients with Lassa fever while in Africa. After clinical testing, he found that prompt and aggressive treatment with ribavirin significantly improved patient survival. He has had over thirty consultancies with organizations such as the World Health Organization (WHO), Pan American Health Organization. He has acted as a reviewer for many scientific journals. McCormick was interviewed in 2006 for the television program Frontline "The Age of Aids" produced by the Public Broadcasting Service.

== Personal life ==
McCormick He is married to a epidemiologist Dr. Susan Fisher-Hoch.
