= Susan Fisher-Hoch =

British infectious disease specialist

Susan P. Fisher-Hoch M.D.
- Born: Susan P. Fisher-Hoch; 1940 (age 85–86)
- Known for: Level 4: Virus Hunters of the CDC
- Spouse: Joseph B. McCormick
- Awards: Women in Technology International (2008)
- Scientific career
- Fields: Medicine
- Institutions: Centers for Disease Control; University of Texas; Aga Khan University

Susan P. Fisher-Hoch (born 1940) is a British-born infectious-disease specialist who has made major contributions to the understanding of Legionnaires' disease and Lassa fever. She is the co-author, along with her husband Joseph B. McCormick, of the memoir Level 4: Virus Hunters of the CDC. Fisher-Hoch is professor of epidemiology at The University of Texas Health Science Center School of Public Health. She was inducted into the Women in Technology International Hall of Fame in 2008.

In 1993, Susan and her husband moved to Karachi, Pakistan, where they worked at the Aga Khan University. During her time there, she supervised the clinical microbiology laboratory which was the largest in Pakistan.

== Ebola virus disease ==
During her tenure at the United States Centers for Disease Control, Fisher-Hoch worked on Ebola virus disease.
