= Jeff Vintar =

American screenwriter

- Occupation: Screenwriter

Jeff Vintar is an American screenwriter born in Oak Park, Illinois, who has worked on the films I, Robot, the TV series The Hot Zone, as well as the films Long Hello and Short Goodbye and Final Fantasy: The Spirits Within.

== Filmography ==
=== Film ===
- Spaceless (2023).
- I, Robot (2004).
- Final Fantasy: The Spirits Within (2001).
- Long Hello and Short Goodbye (1999).

=== Television ===
- The Hot Zone (2019).

== Projects in development ==
Syfy announced development of the Stephen King novel The Eyes of the Dragon as a movie or miniseries, where Michael Taylor and Jeff Vintar were reported as scriptwriters. At latest report (May 2019), Hulu was reported to be adapting the book as a television series, with no mention of use of the earlier Vintar script.
