= Richard Preston =

American writer and author

- Born: Richard Preston; August 5, 1954 (age 72); Cambridge, Massachusetts, U.S.
- Education: Wellesley High School; Pomona College; Princeton University (PhD)
- Occupations: Fiction and non-fiction writer, journalist
- Years active: 1954–present
- Notable work: The Hot Zone (1994); The Cobra Event (1998); The Demon in the Freezer (2002); Micro (2011)

Richard Preston (born August 5, 1954) is a writer for The New Yorker and bestselling author who has written books about infectious disease, bioterrorism, redwoods and other subjects, as well as fiction.

== Biography ==
Preston was born in Cambridge, Massachusetts. He graduated Wellesley High School in Massachusetts in 1972 and attended Pomona College in Claremont, California. He earned a Ph.D. in English from Princeton University in 1983.

His 1992 New Yorker article "Crisis in the Hot Zone" was expanded into his breakout book, The Hot Zone (1994). It is classified as a "non-fiction thriller" about ebolaviruses. He learned of Ebola through such contacts as U.S. Army researchers Drs. C.J. Peters and Nancy Jaax. His fascination began during a visit to Africa where he was an eyewitness to epidemics. The book served as the (very loose) basis of the Hollywood movie Outbreak (1995) about military machinations surrounding a fictional "Motaba virus".

Preston's novel The Cobra Event (1998), about a terrorism release of a fictional virus combining various qualities of different diseases upon New York City, alarmed even then-President Bill Clinton who, shortly after reading it, instigated a review of bio-terror threats to the U.S. The book strove to tell a fast-paced thriller narrative within the bounds of well-researched bio-terrorism possibility, and was reportedly pressed upon Clinton by a molecular biologist when he was attending a Renaissance Weekend event.

The Demon in the Freezer (2002) covers the story of the eradication of smallpox, perhaps the most destructive virus to have plagued mankind. It details the survival of the virus in research labs and bio-weapon programs of Russia and other nations, despite its eradication in the human population. The narrative continues with anthrax, a bacterial disease of cattle and humans, used in the 2001 anthrax attacks.

Preston's personal hobby of recreational tree climbing is introduced in The Wild Trees (2007). His climbing experience likely led him to write about the largest known redwoods like Lost Monarch in the Grove of Titans, or Iluvatar, described in that book along with delicate forest canopy ecosystems.

Preston's Panic in Level 4: Cannibals, Killer Viruses, and Other Journeys to the Edge of Science is a collection of essays related to his experiences researching his previous books.

In November 2009, Preston was selected by Harper-Collins and the Michael Crichton estate to complete his unfinished novel Micro after Crichton's death in November 2008. The book was released on November 22, 2011. Approximately a third of Micro was completed by Crichton. Preston completed the book according to the author's remaining outline, notes, and research.

In 2016, Preston served as the Bedell Distinguished Visiting Professor at the University of Iowa's Nonfiction Writing Program where he judged the prestigious Iowa Prize in Literary Nonfiction.

Preston resides in Hopewell, New Jersey, with his wife, Michelle, and their two daughters and one son. He is also the brother of best-selling author Douglas Preston.

Minor planet 3792 Preston is named in his honor.

== Bibliography ==
=== Novels ===
- 1997: The Cobra Event. New York: Random House. November 1997. ISBN 0-679-45714-3., or Cobra's Eye
- 2003: The Boat of Dreams: A Christmas Story. illus. George Henry Jennings. New York: Simon & Schuster. 2003. ISBN 0-7432-4592-X.
- 2011: Micro. HarperCollins. November 22, 2011. ISBN 978-0-06-087302-8. Co-written with Michael Crichton; completed after Crichton's death.

=== Non-fiction ===
Articles

- Preston, Richard (December 3, 2012). "The Talk of the Town: Gone South: Flight of the Dragonflies". The New Yorker. Vol. 88, no. 38. pp. 40, 42.

Nature

- 2007: The Wild Trees: A Story of Passion and Daring. New York: Random House. 2007. ISBN 978-1-4000-6489-2.

Science

- 2008: Panic in Level 4: Cannibals, Killer Viruses, and Other Journeys to the Edge of Science. New York: Random House. 2008. ISBN 978-1-4000-6490-8.

True events

- 1987: First Light: The Search for the Edge of the Universe. New York: Atlantic Monthly Press. 1987. ISBN 9780871132000; OCLC 16004290
- 1991: American Steel: Hot Metal Men and the Resurrection of the Rust Belt. New York: Prentice Hall Press. 1991. ISBN 0-13-029604-X.
- 1994: The Hot Zone: The Terrifying True Story of the Origins of the Ebola Virus. New York: Random House. 1994. ISBN 0-679-43094-6.
- 2002: The Demon in the Freezer: The Terrifying Truth about the Threat from Bioterrorism. New York: Random House. January 2002. ISBN 0-375-50856-2.
- 2019: Crisis in the Red Zone: The Story of the Deadliest Ebola Outbreak in History, and of the Outbreaks to Come. New York: Random House. 2019. ISBN 978-0-8129-9883-2.
