= List of megaprojects =

This is a list of megaprojects, which may be defined as projects that cost more than US$1 billion and attract a large amount of public attention because of their effects on communities, the natural and built environment, and budgets; or more simply "initiatives that are physical, very expensive, and public".

Megaprojects can be found in many fields of human endeavor, including bridges, tunnels, highways, railways, hospitals, airports, seaports, power plants, dams, wastewater projects, Special Economic Zones (SEZ), oil and natural gas extraction projects, public buildings, information technology systems, aerospace projects, and military weapons. The following lists are far from comprehensive.

== Legend ==
Terms used in the Status column	Status color
Proposed	
In Planning, Approved, Under/In Development, Under Construction, Re-Construction In Progress, Nearly Complete	
On Hold	
Abandoned, Cancelled	
Completed	

== Aerospace projects ==
Project	Companies	Location	Proposal year	Status	End year	Cost	Notes	Ref
A-7 Corsair II	Ling-Temco-Vought	United States	1963	Completed	1984		A single-seat carrier-capable subsonic attack fighter used by the U.S. Air Force and U.S. Navy in the 1960s to 1990s. A derivative of the Vought F-8 Crusader, it saw heavy use in battle in Southeast Asia in addition to its subsequent use in later conflicts such as the Gulf War.	
Airbus A380	Airbus		2003	Completed	2021	US$25 billion	A double-deck, wide-body, four-engine jet airliner.	
Antonov An-225	Antonov		1988	Completed	2022		This was the longest and heaviest aircraft in service until it was destroyed during the Russian-Ukrainian conflict. Only one was completed.	
B-1 Lancer	Rockwell International	United States	1980s	Completed			A supersonic bomber with a variable-sweep wing built in the 1980s as a strategic bomber. It has since acquired conventional and multi-role capabilities.	
B-2 Spirit	Northrop Grumman	United States	1987	Completed	2000		A US heavy bomber with "low observable" stealth. Total program cost including development, engineering, and testing averaged $2.1 billion per aircraft in 1997.	
B-29 Superfortress	Boeing	United States	1943	Completed	1946	US$3 billion	The first nuclear bomber cost 50% more to develop than the bombs in the Manhattan Project.	
B-52 Stratofortress	Boeing	United States	1952	Completed	1963		One of the largest military aircraft ever built. In service since 1955, with decades more planned. All subsequent U.S. bombers have also been megaprojects.	
B-58 Hustler	Convair	United States	1960	Completed	1970		An all-weather, high altitude supersonic bomber with a fixed delta wing and 4 engines. The Hustler was operational from 1960 to 1970 in the US Air Force's Strategic Air Command for the deployment of up to 5 gravity nuclear weapons.	
Boeing 2707 and Lockheed L-2000 supersonic aircraft	Lockheed, Boeing, US Department of Defense	United States	1963	Cancelled	1971		A U.S. government competition to build the first U.S. supersonic transport (SST) was canceled before prototypes were built for political, environmental and economic reasons.	
Boeing 747	Boeing		1970	Completed	2023		A wide-body commercial airliner first produced in 1970, often referred to by the nickname Jumbo Jet, is among the world's most recognizable aircraft with uses for long-distance passenger transport, cargo, the US President's official shuttle plane, and as NASA's Shuttle Carrier Aircraft.	
Boeing 787	Boeing	United States	2007	Completed	Ongoing		Made with local and globally sourced parts; the first major aircraft to be made largely out of composite materials.	
C-5 Galaxy	Lockheed	United States	1961	Completed	1969	Over $1 billion	The largest and heaviest aircraft of any kind for over a decade (1970 to 1982). This military cargo plane was the first development program with a billion dollar cost overrun.	
Concorde	Aérospatiale, British Aircraft Corporation	United Kingdom, France	1965	Completed	1979		A product of an Anglo-French government treaty, the supersonic passenger airliner Concorde entered service in 1976 and continued commercial flights for twenty-seven years.	
F-22 Raptor	Lockheed Martin	United States	1996	Completed	2011		A single seat, twin-engine fifth-generation fighter that uses stealth technology.	
F-35 Lightning II	Lockheed Martin	United States	2006	Completed	Ongoing	US$2 trillion	A single seat, single engine, all-weather stealth multirole combat aircraft that is intended to perform both air superiority and strike missions. $2 trillion cost is from 2000 to 2088.	
KH-11 Kennen	Lockheed	United States	1976	Completed	1990		Reconnaissance satellite.	
Sukhoi Su-57	Sukhoi	Russia		Completed			A fifth-generation stealth fighter jointly developed for the Russian Air Force. Indian Air Force cancelled its order.	
TF Kaan	Turkish Aerospace Industries	Turkey	2011	In progress	2030s	$20 billion	A stealthy, twin-engine, all-weather air superiority fighter, classified as a fifth-generation fighter.	
Tupolev Tu-144	Tupolev	Soviet Union	1968	Completed			The first supersonic transport aircraft. First flown on 31 Dec 1968; entered service on 26 Dec 1975.	
Tupolev Tu-160	Tupolev	Soviet Union		Completed			The largest combat aircraft, supersonic aircraft, and variable-sweep aircraft ever built.	

== Disaster cleanup ==
While most megaprojects are planned and undertaken with careful forethought, some are undertaken out of necessity after a natural disaster occurs. There have also been a few human-made disasters. Major restoration was necessary after the destruction caused by World War I and II, some of which was paid for by German reparations for World War I and for World War II.

Project	Location	Disaster	Disaster year	Status	Completion year	Cost	Notes	Ref
Great Mississippi Flood relief	Mississippi Delta region	Great Mississippi Flood of 1927	1927	Completed		$246 million to $1 billion	$4.2–$17.3 billion in 2023 dollars	
Mount St. Helens eruption cleanup	Washington state, U.S.	1980 eruption of Mount St. Helens	1980	Completed		$1.1 billion		
Chernobyl New Safe Confinement	Chernobyl, Ukraine	Chernobyl disaster	1986	Completed	2019	€2.15 billion	The New Safe Confinement accounts for €1.5 billion, with the remainder going to related remedial work and maintenance.	
Exxon Valdez oil spill	Prince William Sound	Exxon Valdez oil spill	1989	Completed		Over $2 billion		
Northridge earthquake disaster relief	Los Angeles, U.S.	1994 Northridge earthquake	1994	Completed		$13–50 billion		
AZF chemical factory explosion cleanup	Toulouse, France	Toulouse chemical factory explosion	2001	Completed		€2 billion		
Humanitarian response to the 2004 Indian Ocean earthquake	Indian Ocean coastline areas	2004 Indian Ocean earthquake and tsunami	2004	Completed		US$6.25 billion		
Hurricane Katrina disaster relief	Atlantic basin countries	Hurricane Katrina	2005	Completed		$190 billion		
Deepwater Horizon cleanup	Gulf of Mexico	Deepwater Horizon oil spill	2010	Completed		$65 billion		
Fukushima disaster cleanup	Fukushima, Japan	Fukushima Daiichi nuclear disaster	2011	Completed		US$187 billion	Cost includes compensation, decontamination, interim storage, and decommissioning of reactors.	
Tōhoku earthquake and tsunami disaster relief	Pacific Rim	2011 Tōhoku earthquake and tsunami	2011	Completed		US$360 billion	Cost includes Fukushima disaster cleanup and economic losses.	

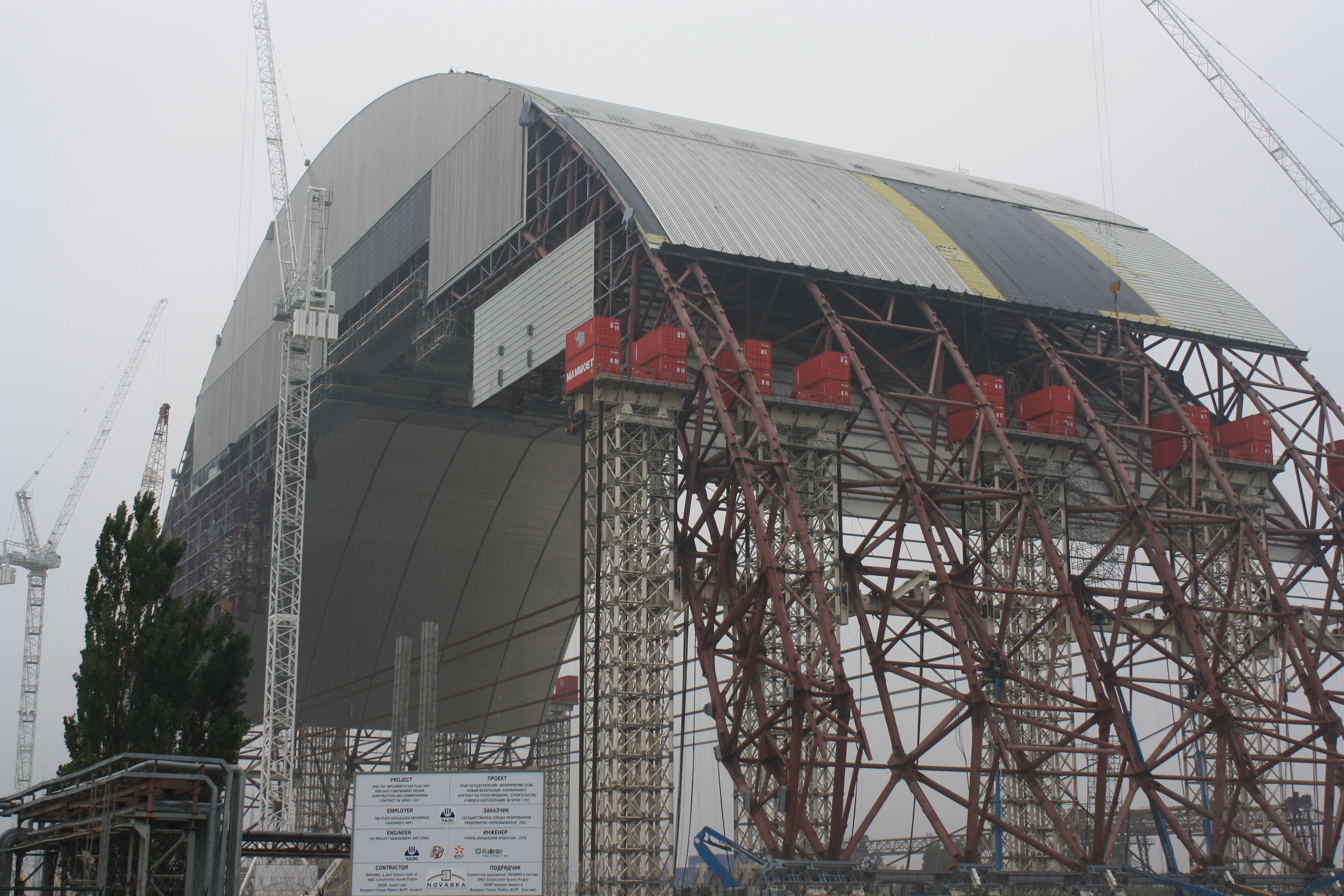
Construction of the new confinement structure for the nuclear reactor that melted down at Chernobyl in Ukraine.

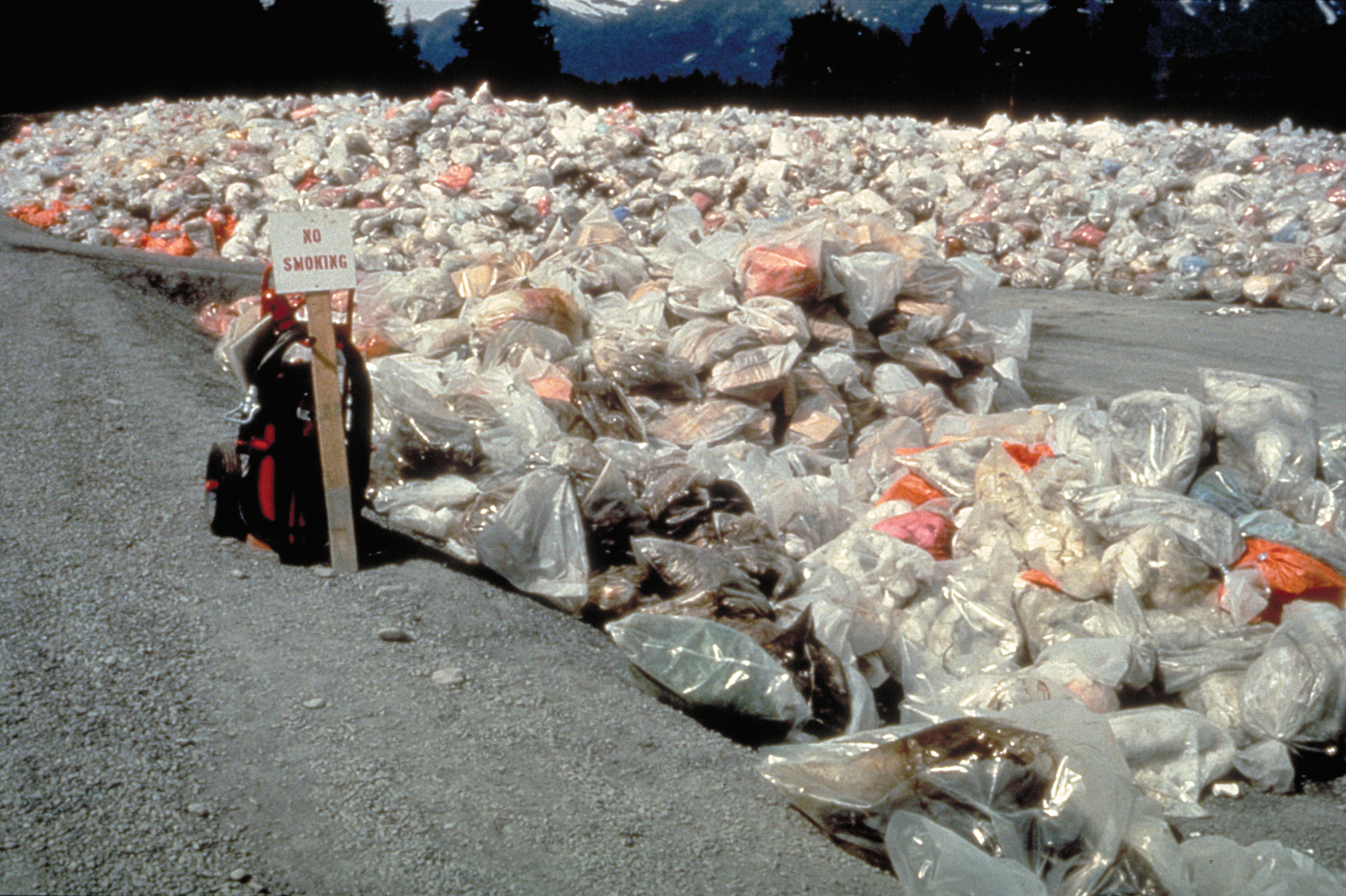
Bags of oily waste are piled up during the cleanup of the Exxon Valdez oil spill in 1989.

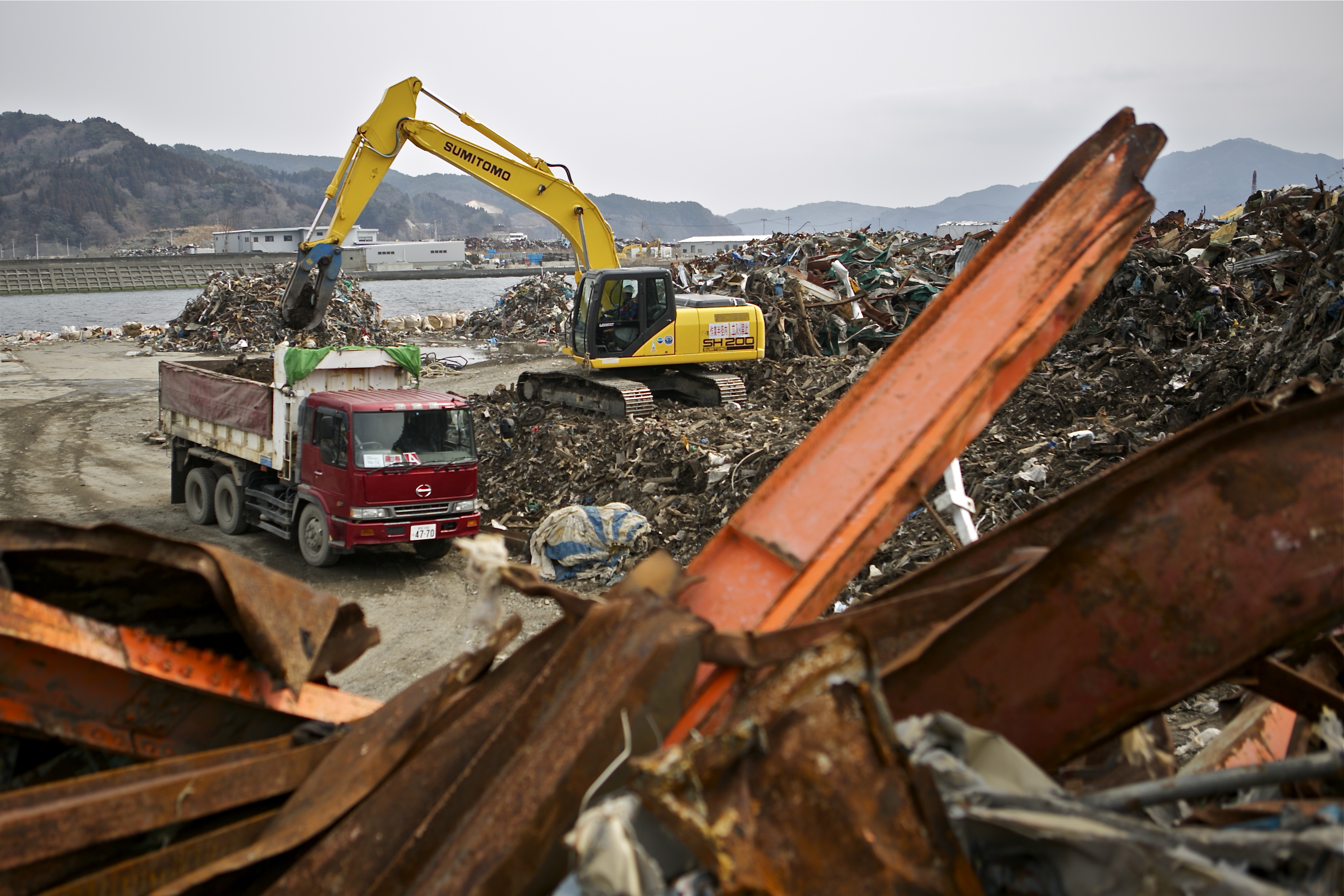
Tsunami cleanup in Japan.

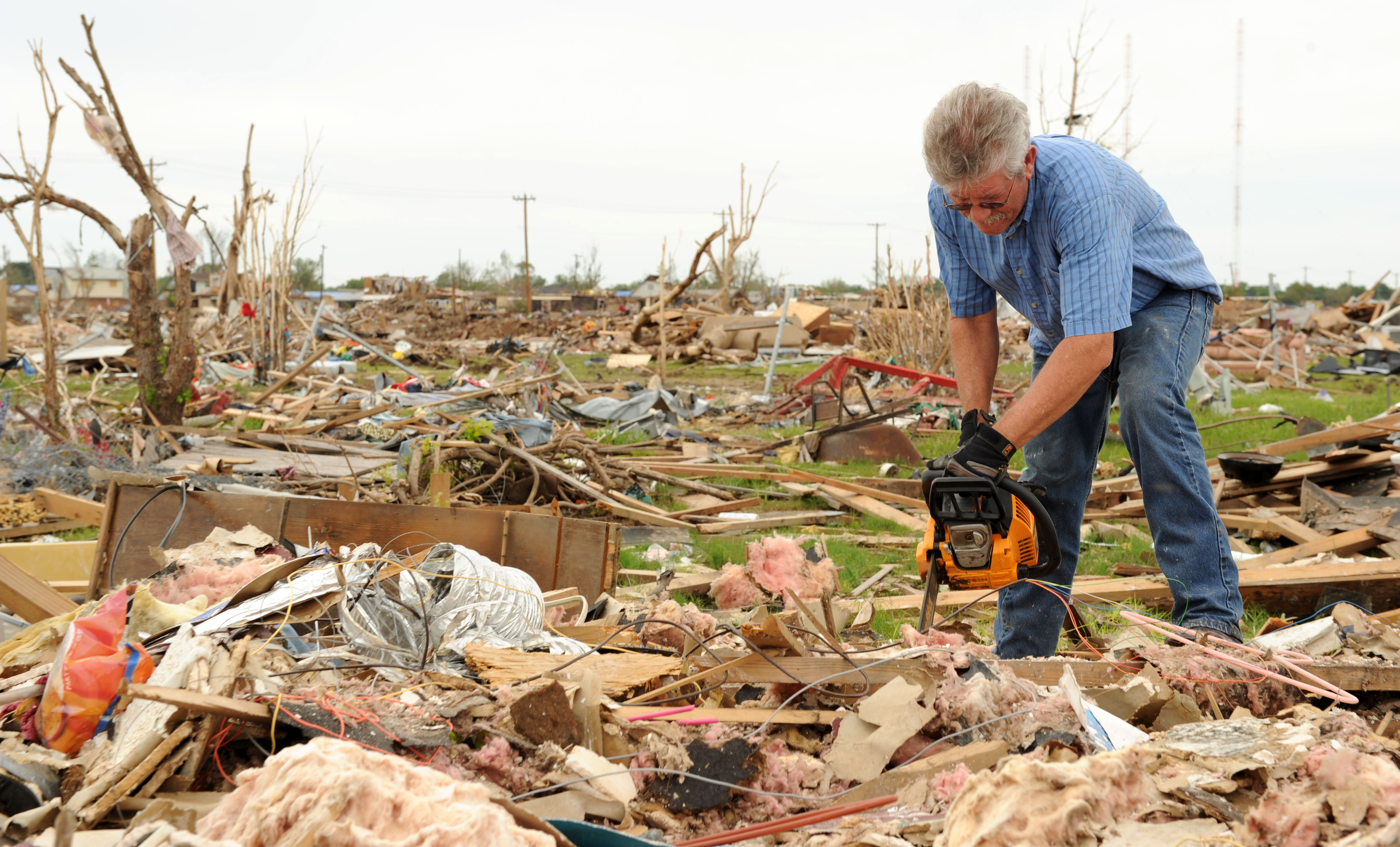
A Moore, Oklahoma resident begins cleaning debris from the wreckage of his home in the aftermath of the 2013 tornado.

== Energy projects ==
Project	Location	Capacity (MW)	Start year	Status	Completion year	Cost (billions)	Notes	Ref
Abreu e Lima Refinery	Abreu e Lima, Brazil		2007	Under construction	est. 2029	$20 bn USD		
Angra 3 Nuclear Power Plant	Angra dos Reis, Brazil	1405 MW	1981	Under construction	est. 2033	$6.7 bn USD	The construction works have undergone several stoppages over the decades.	
Australia-Asia Power Link	Northern Territory, Australia			Proposed		$35 bn AUD (est.)	Electricity infrastructure project planned to include the world's largest solar plant, the world's largest battery, and the world's longest submarine power cable.	
Celtic Interconnector	Cork, Ireland	700	2023	Under construction	est. 2026	€1.6 bn EUR (est.)	Subsea HVDC connection between Ireland and France under the Celtic Sea	
Khavda Solar Park	Gujarat, India	30000		Completed	2025		Located in the Rann of Kutch; will cover an area of 726 km^{2} (280 sq mi) once completed.	
Omkareshwar Floating Solar Power Park	Madhya Pradesh, India	600		Under construction	2023 (Phase I)		Aims to become the world's largest floating solar park.	
KSEB- Kerala Dam Wind Farm, India	Kerala, India	100 MW		Under construction	2025			
Bhadla Solar Park	Rajasthan, India	2245		Completed	2020		One of the world's largest photovoltaic power stations.	
Benban Solar Park	Egypt	1500		Completed	2019	$3.5–4 bn USD		
Bataan Nuclear Power Plant	Morong, Bataan, Philippines	621		Completed	1984	Over $2.3 bn USD	The plant never opened due to political change and safety issues, and its planned reactivation has become the focal point of the Anti-nuclear movement in the Philippines.	
Boundary Dam Power Station	Saskatchewan, Canada	531	1959	Completed		$1.5 bn CAD	The world's first large-scale, coal-fired carbon capture and storage plant	
Gorakhpur Nuclear Power Plant	Haryana, India	1400		In progress	2032		NPCIL had started the procurement activities for this project, as BHEL secured the order for supply of steam generators to this project	
Genesis Solar Energy Project	Blythe, California, U.S.	250		Completed	2014		One of the largest operational solar thermal power stations.	
Ivanpah Solar Power Facility	Mojave Desert, California, U.S.	392		Completed			One of the largest operational solar thermal power stations. Operational since February 2014.	
Kemper County Energy Facility	Mississippi, U.S.	582	2010	Suspended		$7.5 bn USD	The world's first construction attempt of an Integrated Gasification Combined Cycle plant with Carbon Capture & Sequestration. However, after significant delays and cost overruns, the gasification process is currently suspended and the power plant runs just on regular natural gas.	
Mojave Solar Project	Barstow, California, U.S.	280		Completed	2014		One of the largest operational solar thermal power stations.	
Noor Abu Dhabi	Abu Dhabi, UAE	1177		Completed	2019		One of the world's largest photovoltaic power stations.	
Olkiluoto 3	Eurajoki, Finland	1600	2005	Completed	2022	€11 bn EUR	Began regular operations in April 2023.	
Panamanian Natural Gas electric power plant	Colón Province, Panama						Currently has an investment of $1.15 bn USD.	
Pavagada Solar Park	Karnataka, India	2050		Completed	2019		One of the world's largest photovoltaic power stations.	
Quaid-e-Azam Solar Park	Bahawalpur, Pakistan	1000	2015	Completed			Phase-1 of 100 MW Operational since 2015. Expected to be one of the largest operational solar thermal power stations.	
Rio de Janeiro Petrochemical Complex	Rio de Janeiro, Brazil		2006	Under construction	est. 2030	Over $47 bn USD		
Rooppur Nuclear Power Plant	Ishwardi, Bangladesh		2017	Under construction	est. 2027	$12.65 billion	It will be the country's first nuclear power plant.	
Solana Generating Station	Gila Bend, Arizona, U.S.	280		Completed	2013		Includes a 6h thermal energy storage. One of the largest operational solar thermal power stations.	
Solar Energy Generating Systems	Mojave Desert, California, U.S.	354	1984-1991	Completed			Collection of 9 units. One of the largest operational solar thermal power stations.	
Tengger Desert Solar Park	Ningxia, China	1547		Completed	2016		One of the world's largest photovoltaic power stations.	
Three Gorges Dam	Hubei Province, China	22500	1994	Completed	2003	¥203 bn	The largest hydro-electric facility in the world.	
Tres Amigas SuperStation	United States		n/a	Cancelled	n/a	$2 bn (early estimate)	A proposed interconnection between the Eastern Interconnection, the Western Interconnection, and the Texas Interconnection, effectively connecting nearly all electrical grids in North America.	
Virgil C. Summer Nuclear Generating Station	Jenkinsville, South Carolina, U.S.	973	2013	Cancelled		Over $2.5 bn USD	The project planned to construct some of the first new nuclear units in the United States in over 30 years at an existing nuclear power plant. The project was cancelled and all work stopped in July 2017.	
Vogtle Electric Generating Plant	Waynesboro, Georgia, U.S.		2013	Completed	2024 (proj.)		Construction of two new nuclear units at an existing nuclear power plant.	
Yarlung Zangbo hydropower project	Nyingchi, Tibet Autonomous Region, China		2025	Under construction		1.2 trillion RMB	A hydropower project under construction on the lower reaches of the Yarlung Tsangpo River in the People's Republic of China.	

== Science projects ==
=== Research and development ===
Project	Location	Start year	Status	End year	Cost	Notes	Ref
Copernicus	European Union	1998	Ongoing		€6.8 billion (2020)	Satellite constellation program for global monitoring	
COVID-19 vaccine development	Worldwide	2020	Completed	2023	€93 billion (2021)	Global efforts to develop a vaccine against the SARS-CoV-2 virus	
Human Genome Project	United States/Worldwide	1990	Completed	2003	$5 billion USD (2021 adj.)	U.S.-led international effort to sequence the human genome	
Manhattan Project	United States	1942	Completed	1946	$22.8 billion USD (2021 adj.)	U.S. government effort to produce the first nuclear bombs.	

=== Physics and astronomy infrastructure ===
Project	Location	Start year	Status	End year	Cost	Notes	Ref
Atacama Large Millimeter Array	Atacama Desert, Chile		Completed				
Deep Underground Neutrino Experiment and the Long Baseline Neutrino Facility	Fermilab, Sanford Underground Research Facility, U.S.	2032 (proj.)	In progress		$3 billion USD (phase 1 est.)		
Electron-ion collider	Brookhaven National Laboratory, U.S.	2020	In progress		US$1.6–2.6 billion		
Envisat	Outer space	2002	Completed			An Earth observation satellite of the European Space Agency; inactive since 2012.	
European Spallation Source	Lund, Sweden	2013	In progress	2025 (proj.)		Strongest-ever spallation source for advanced and new material research development.	
European X-ray free electron laser	Schenefeld, Germany	2017	Completed		€1.22 billion	Used for material research.	
Extreme Light Infrastructure	Czech Republic, Hungary, Romania					European centers for the most intense lasers	
Extremely Large Telescope	Chile	2014	In progress	2029 (proj.)		World's largest optical to mid infrared telescope.	
Facility for Antiproton and Ion Research	Darmstadt, Germany	2012	In progress	2025 (proj.)			
Five hundred meter Aperture Spherical Telescope	Guizhou Province, China	2011	Completed	2020	¥1.2 billion	The world's largest static/semi-static radio telescope measuring 500 m (1,600 ft) across.	
Giant Magellan Telescope	Vallenar, Chile	2015	In progress	2025 (proj.)	US$2 billion	A large ground-based optical and near infrared telescope.	
India-based Neutrino Observatory	Tamil Nadu, India	2015	In progress		₹1,500 crore (est.) (15 billion)		
ITER	France	2013	In progress	2025 (proj.)	Up to €65 billion (est.)	International effort to build the world's largest nuclear fusion reactor.	
Large Hadron Collider	Switzerland, France	1997		2007	~$4.75 billion	13 TeV CERN particle accelerator. Compact Muon Solenoid detector for the Large Hadron Collider	
Advanced LIGO	Washington state and Louisiana, U.S.	1994	Completed	2002	More than US$1 billion	A large-scale physics experiment and observatory to measure gravitational waves	
MYRRHA	Belgium		In progress	2036 (proj.)		Prototype of an accelerator-driven system to transmute nuclear waste	
National Ignition Facility	Lawrence Livermore National Laboratory, U.S.	1997	Completed	2009	Almost $1 billion (2002 est.)	United States nuclear fusion project	
Ocean Networks Canada	University of Victoria, Canada					Largest underwater observatories, providing 24/7 access to hundreds of instruments in the Pacific Ocean and the Salish Sea.	
Proton Improvement Project ("PIP II")		2020	In progress	2028 (proj.)	$1.28 billion USD	2022 est.	
Square Kilometre Array	South Africa, Australia	2018	In progress	2028 (proj.)	€2 billion		
Superconducting Super Collider	Waxahachie, Texas, U.S.		Cancelled		US$8.4 billion (1993 est.)	40 TeV particle accelerator	
Tevatron	Batavia, Illinois, U.S.	1969	Completed	1983	US$120 million	Inactive TeV particle accelerator.	
Thirty Meter Telescope	Mauna Kea Observatories, U.S.	2014	Halted			Large optical and near infrared telescope. Halted due to protests.	
Very Large Array	New Mexico, U.S.	1973	Completed	1980		Radio astronomy observatory.	
Virgo interferometer	Cascina, Italy	1996	Completed	2003		Gravitational-wave observatory	
Wendelstein 7-X	Greifswald, Germany	2005	Completed	2015	€1.06 billion	An experimental stellarator (nuclear fusion reactor)	

=== Spacecraft ===
Project	Organization(s)	Start year	Status	End year	Cost	Notes	Ref
Advanced Telescope for High Energy Astrophysics	ESA	2000s	In progress	2035 (proj.)		Planned X-ray telescope.	
Cassini–Huygens	NASA, ESA, ASI		Completed	2017	$3.26 billion USD	Spacecraft mission that studied Saturn and its many natural satellites.	
Chandrayaan program	ISRO	2003	Active		$170 million USD	Lunar exploration program.	
Chang'e 1 to Chang'e 6	China		Active			Lunar exploration spacecraft equipped with landers, orbiters and rover. It will for the first time in history explore the dark side of the Moon.	
Compass navigation system	China	Est. 2015	Completed	Est. 2017		Independent system of satellite navigation	
Europa Clipper	NASA	2022	Active			Interplanetary mission to study Jupiter's moon Europa. Launched October 2024.	
Gaia spacecraft	ESA	2013	Active	2025 (proj.)	$1 billion USD	Mission to create a 3D map of local Milky Way.	
Galileo Navigation Satellite System	European Union, ESA	2016	Active		€5 billion EUR		
Galileo spacecraft	NASA	1989	Completed	2003	$1.5 billion USD (2003)	Mission to Jupiter.	
Global Positioning System	United States Department of Defense	1973	Active		Over $21.7 billion USD	Global satellite navigation system.	
GLONASS	Roscosmos	1982	Active			The Russian global navigation satellite system.	
Herschel Space Observatory	ESA, NASA	2009	Completed	2013	€1.1 billion	Space observatory sensitive to the far infrared and submillimetre bands.	
Hubble Space Telescope	NASA	1978	Active		$10 billion USD	Optical telescope orbiting in low Earth orbit	
International Space Station	NASA, Roscosmos, JAXA, ESA, CSA	1998	Active		$150 billion USD (2010)		
James Webb Space Telescope	NASA, ESA, CSA	2021	Active		$8.8 billion USD (2013)		)
Juno spacecraft	NASA	2011	Active			New Frontiers mission to Jupiter	
Jupiter Icy Moon Explorer	ESA	2023	Active			Mission to Jupiter	
Laser Interferometer Space Antenna	ESA	2032 (proj.)	Proposed			An L3 class mission designed to detect and accurately measure gravitational waves.	
Lunokhod ("Moonwalker")	Soviet space program	1969	Completed	1977		Inactive series of Soviet robotic lunar rovers designed to land on the Moon. Lunokhod 1 was the first roving remote-controlled robot to land on another world.	
Mars program	Soviet space program	1960	Completed	1973		Inactive series of uncrewed spacecraft. The spacecraft were intended to explore Mars, and included flyby probes, landers and orbiters.	
Mars Science Laboratory (with Curiosity)	NASA	2011	Active		$2.5 billion USD		
Mars 2020 (with Perseverance and Ingenuity	NASA	2020	Active			A Mars rover mission under the Mars Exploration Program.	
Mir	Soviet space program, Roscosmos	1986	Completed	2001		Russian space station in low Earth orbit.	
Nancy Grace Roman Space Telescope	NASA	2026	In development			A wide field infrared space telescope.	
NAVIC	ISRO	2013	Active			The Indian equivalent of GPS.	
Orion spacecraft	NASA	2014	Active			Part of the Artemis program.	
Planck spacecraft	ESA	2009	Completed	2013		A mission to measure the cosmic microwave background.	
Venera	Soviet space program	1961	Completed	1984		Venus series space probes developed to gather data from Venus. Venera 7 became the first spacecraft to land on Venus and first to transmit data from there back to Earth.	
Sutherland spaceport	British space programme	2023	In development			This will be the first spaceport in the UK.	

=== Other spaceflight projects ===
Project	Organization(s)	Start year	Status	End year	Cost	Notes	Ref
Alpha Magnetic Spectrometer	NASA, Roscosmos, JAXA, ESA, CSA	2011	Active		$2 billion	A particle physics experiment module mounted on the International Space Station	
Apollo program	NASA	1960	Completed	1975	$203.4 billion USD (2015)	As a centerpiece of the US Space Program, culminated in crewed exploratory missions to the Moon.	
Ariane	ESA	1973	Active			A family of European launch vehicles; the most recent variant is Ariane 6.	
Artemis program	NASA with partners JAXA, ESA, CSA, DLR, ASI, ISA	2017	Active				
Avatar RLV	DRDO, ISRO		Proposed			Indian version of the Space Shuttle.	
Baikonur Cosmodrome	Soviet space program, Roscosmos, Russian Aerospace Forces	1955	Active			The world's first and largest operational space launch facility. It was originally built by the Soviet Union in the late 1950s as the base of operations for the Soviet space program.	
Buran program	Soviet space program, Roscosmos	1974	Cancelled	1993		Soviet version of the Space Shuttle.	
Constellation program	NASA	2005	Cancelled	2010		Cancelled planned Moon landing spacecraft and Space Shuttle replacement. Part of it lives on as future Crew Escape Vehicle for the ISS.	
SpaceX Mars transportation infrastructure	SpaceX	2016	Active			A privately funded spaceflight system capable of enabling human settlements on Mars.	
Kennedy Space Center	NASA	1968	Active			The main spaceport for US-crewed space flight.	
Shenzhou program	China Manned Space Agency	1992	Active			Chinese human spaceflight program.	
Soyuz program	Soviet space program, Roscosmos	1966	Active			Human spaceflight program.	
Soviet Moonshot	Soviet space program	1962	Cancelled	1969		Cancelled Moon landing program.	
Space Launch System	NASA	2011	Active			An American Space Shuttle-derived heavy expendable launch vehicle.	
Space Shuttle program	NASA	1972	Completed	2011	$203.6 billion USD (2015)	Low Earth orbiters designed as crewed cargo vessels that could be reused after each spaceflight and landed like a glider.	
Vostochny Cosmodrome ("Eastern Spaceport")	Roscosmos	2011	Active			Russian spaceport on the 51st parallel north.	
Vostok program	Soviet space program	1959	Completed	1963		Soviet program to put the first man in space.	

== Sports and culture projects ==
Every Olympic Games and FIFA World Cup in the latter part of the twentieth century and entering into the 21st century has cost more than $1 billion in arenas, hotels etc., usually several billions. The Olympic Games are considered to be the world's foremost international sporting event with over 200 nations participating. Sports-related costs for the Summer Games since 1960 is on average $5.2 billion (USD) and for the Winter Games $393.1 million. The highest recorded total cost was the 2014 Sochi Winter Olympics, costing approximately US$55 billion. The International Olympic Committee requires a minimum of 40,000 hotel rooms available for visiting spectators and an Olympic Village that is able to house 15,000 athletes, referees, and officials.

Project	Organization(s)	Location	Start year	Status	End year	Cost (billions) & date	Notes	Ref
Allegiant Stadium	National Football League	Paradise, Nevada, U.S.		Completed	2020	$1.9 (2020)	This covered-roof stadium is home to the Las Vegas Raiders as well as a local college team, the UNLV Rebels	
AT&T Stadium	National Football League	Arlington, Texas, U.S.		Completed	2009	$1.3 (2009)	A retractable-roof stadium that houses the Dallas Cowboys. It also hosts other major events, most notably the Big 12 Championship Game and Cotton Bowl Classic in college football.	
Barclays Center	National Basketball Association	Brooklyn, New York, U.S.		Completed	2012	$1 (2012)	Home of the Brooklyn Nets. Also served as full-time or part-time home of the NHL's New York Islanders from 2015 to 2020.	
Climate Pledge Arena	National Hockey League	Seattle, Washington, U.S.		Completed	2021	$1.05 (2021)	Renovation and expansion of Seattle's main indoor arena for the Seattle Kraken, which started NHL play in the rebuilt venue in 2021. The originally planned cost of $700 million was increased due to changes to the arena plans and COVID-19 issues. A very small part of the total cost was to pay for another major arena tenant, the Seattle Storm of the WNBA, to move its home games to other area venues during the project. The arena will also be suitable for a potential NBA franchise in the city.	
Globe Life Field	Major League Baseball	Arlington, Texas, U.S.		Completed	2020	$1.1 (2020)	This retractable-roof stadium houses the Texas Rangers.	
Guangzhou Football Park	China League One	Guangzhou, Guangdong, China	2020	In progress		¥12 (2022)	100,000-seat football stadium intended to be the future home of Guangzhou F.C. of the Chinese Super League. Construction began in April 2020 and cancelled in 2022 due Evergrande's financial difficulties. Construction recontinued in 2023.	
Levi's Stadium	National Football League	Santa Clara, California, U.S.		Completed	2014	$1.3 (2014)	An open-air stadium that houses the San Francisco 49ers.	
Mercedes-Benz Stadium	National Football League	Atlanta, Georgia, U.S.		Completed	2017	$1.6 (2017)	A retractable-roof stadium to house the Atlanta Falcons, as well as Atlanta United FC of Major League Soccer.	
MetLife Stadium	National Football League	East Rutherford, New Jersey, U.S.		Completed	2010	$1.6 (2010)	An open-air stadium that houses two NFL teams, the New York Giants and New York Jets.	
Narendra Modi Stadium	Board of Control for Cricket in India	Ahmedabad, Gujarat, India	2015	Completed	2020	US$0.11 (2020)	It is the largest cricket stadium in the world with a seating capacity of 132,000 spectators.	
New Stadium at RFK Campus	National Football League	Washington, D.C., U.S.	2027	In progress	2030	$3.8 (2026)	A covered-roof stadium to house the NFL team Washington Commanders. Includes adjacent mixed-use districts.	
New Highmark Stadium	National Football League	Orchard Park, New York, U.S.	2023	Completed	2026	$1.7 (2023)	An open-air stadium to house the Buffalo Bills.	
New Nissan Stadium	National Football League	Nashville, Tennessee, U.S.	2024	In progress	2027	$2.1 (2024)	A covered-roof stadium to house the Tennessee Titans.	
Sardar Vallbhbhai Patel Sports Enclave	Summer Olympic Games	Ahmedabad, Gujarat, India	2021	In progress		US$0.64 (2021)		
SoFi Stadium	National Football League	Inglewood, California, U.S.		Completed	2020	$4.9 (2020)	This covered-roof stadium houses two NFL teams, the Los Angeles Rams, who own the stadium, and the Los Angeles Chargers.	
Tottenham Hotspur Stadium	Premier League	London, UK		Completed	2019	£0.85 (2019)	Home to the Tottenham Hotspur F.C. Also designed to host American football games in the NFL International Series	
U.S. Bank Stadium	National Football League	Minneapolis, Minnesota, U.S.		Completed	2016	$1.061 (2016)	A covered-roof stadium that is home to the Minnesota Vikings.	
UBS Arena	National Hockey League	Elmont, New York, U.S.	2019	Completed	2021	$1 (2021)	This new multi-use arena is designed to handle 18,000 seats to host New York Islanders home games.	
Wembley Stadium	The Football Association	London, UK		Completed	2007	£0.798 (2007)	Home of the England national football team; also designed to host many other large events.	
Yankee Stadium	Major League Baseball	Bronx, New York, U.S.		Completed	2009	$2.309 (2009)	This open-air stadium opened as the replacement for the New York Yankees' original Yankee Stadium. It has since become home to a Major League Soccer team, New York City FC.	

== Roads and transport infrastructure ==
Ground transportation systems like roads, tunnels, bridges, terminals, railways, and mass transit systems are often megaprojects. Numerous large airports and terminals used for airborne passenger and cargo transportation are built as megaprojects.

=== Africa ===
Country	Project	Location	Start year	Status	End year	Cost	Notes	Ref
African Union	Great Green Wall of the Sahara and the Sahel	Sahel region	2007	Active			Effort to prevent the expansion of the Sahara Desert.	
Ethiopia	Addis Ababa–Debre Markos Expressway	Addis Ababa, Debre Markos		In progress		$1.64 billion		
Ethiopia	Addis Ababa–Djibouti Railway	Ethiopia, Djibouti	2011	Completed	2016	$4.5 billion		
Ethiopia	Addis Ababa–Jimma Expressway	Addis Ababa, Jimma		In progress		$2.03 billion		
Ethiopia	Addis Ababa–Kombolcha–Dessie Expressway	Addis Ababa, Kombolcha, Dessie		In progress		$2.32 billion		
Ethiopia	Awash–Weldiya Railway	Ethiopia, Djibouti	2015	In progress		$1.7 billion		
Ethiopia	Bishoftu International Airport	Bishoftu, Ethiopia	2026	In progress	2030	$12.5 billion	The first phase, which can accommodate up to 60 million passengers per year, is currently under construction and is expected to finish work in 2030. The second phase, which will increase capacity to 110 million, will follow suit.	
Ethiopia	Weldiya–Mekelle Railway	Ethiopia, Djibouti	2017	In progress		$1.5 billion		
Nigeria	Abuja Light Rail	Abuja, FCT, Nigeria		Suspended	2020	$2.65 billion	The first phase of the project connects the city centre to Nnamdi Azikiwe International Airport, stopping at the Lagos–Kano Standard Gauge Railway station in Idu. The first 12 stations opened in July 2018 before services were suspended in early 2020 due to the COVID-19 pandemic.	
Nigeria	Fourth Mainland Bridge	Lagos State	2022	In progress		$4.2 billion	The fourth mainland bridge will join three other bridges connecting Lagos Island to the mainland. The 38 km (24 mi) bridge and expressway will become the longest bridge and expressway in the world when completed.	
Nigeria	Lagos-Calabar Railway	Lagos, Cross River, Rivers, Anambra States	2014	In progress		$11.920 billion	Phase 1 of this 1,402 km (871 mi) standard gauge railway will connect Lagos to Calabar; the second phase will connect Calabar and Lagos through Onitsha.	
Nigeria	Lagos–Kano Standard Gauge Railway	Lagos, Kano, Kaduna, and Oyo States; FCT	2016	In progress		$8.3 billion	This 2,733 km (1,698 mi) standard gauge railway has three planned routes: Abuja to Kaduna, Lagos and Ibadan, and Lagos to Kano. The first two lines opened in 2016 and 2021, respectively.	
Nigeria	Lagos Rail Mass Transit	Lagos State	2009	Completed	2022-2024	$3.6 billion	An urban rail system that is planned to have seven lines. The first line (Blue line) opened in 2023, second (Red line) in 2024.	
Nigeria	Third Mainland Bridge	Lagos State	1970s	Completed	1990		Currently the longest of three bridges connecting Lagos Island to mainland Lagos. It is 11 km (6.8 mi) in length.	

=== Asia ===
Country	Project	Location	Start year	Status	End year	Cost	Notes	Ref
Bangladesh	Padma Bridge	Munshiganj, Shariatpur, and Madaripur Districts	2014	Completed	2022	$3.6 billion	A 6.150 km (3.821 mi) two-level road-rail bridge. It is the longest bridge in Bangladesh, the second-longest in the Indo-Gangetic Plain, and the longest over the Ganges River in terms of both span and the total length.	
Bangladesh	Dhaka Metro Rail	Dhaka	2016	In progress	2030	$2.8 billion	Of the six planned lines, two are operational as of 2022 and 2023, respectively.	
Bangladesh	Karnaphuli Tunnel	Chittagong	2017	Completed	2023	$1.2 billion	First underwater tunnel in the South Asian region.	
Bangladesh	Jamuna Railway Bridge	Sirajganj to Tangail	2020	Completed	2024	$1.6 billion	A 4.8 km (3.0 mi) long railway bridge that is expected to be the largest dedicated rail bridge in the country after completion.	
Bangladesh	Hazrat Shahjalal International Airport Terminal 3	Dhaka	2019	Completed	2025	$2.5 billion	Upon completion of the third terminal, passenger handling capacity of the airport will increase to 20 million from the current 8 million per annum. Cargo handling capacity will also increase to 500,000 from 200,000 tonnes annually.	
Bangladesh	Central Business District	Purbachal		In progress		$17 billion	It will have three super-tall skyscrapers, surrounded by thirty-eight 40+ floor skyscrapers.	
Bahrain	Bahrain International Airport Expansion Project	Muharraq, Muharraq Island		Completed	2021	$1.1 billion USD		
Bahrain	Bahrain Light Rail Network	Nationwide		In progress	2025 (proj.)	$2 billion USD		
India	Bharatmala	Nationwide	2017	In progress		More than $110 billion	Road development project under the Ministry of Road Transport and Highways.	
India	Char Dham Highway	Uttarakhand		In progress		More than $1.5 billion	A two-lane National Highway.	
India	Delhi–Mumbai Industrial Corridor Project	Six Indian states		In progress		More than $90 billion	Investments will be spread across the 1,500 km (930 mi) long Western Dedicated Freight Corridor, which will serve as the industrial corridor's transportation backbone.	
India	Hyderabad Metro Rail	Hyderabad, Telangana	2012	In progress		More than $2.5 billion	Two of the three planned lines became operational in 2017.	
India	Hyperloop	Nationwide		Proposed			Proposal to establish hyperloop infrastructure for the Pune-Mumbai, Chennai-Bangalore, and Amaravati-Vijayawada corridors.	
India	Mumbai–Ahmedabad high-speed rail corridor	Mumbai-Ahmedabad corridor		In progress	2027 (proj.)	More than $18 billion	When completed, it will be India's first high-speed rail line.	
India	Navi Mumbai International Airport	Mumbai	2021	Completed	2025	More than $2.5 billion	This project aims to ease air traffic congestion at Chhatrapati Shivaji Maharaj International Airport.	
India	Noida International Airport	Noida, Uttar Pradesh	2021	Completed	2025	More than $4 billion	This airport aims to decongest the load of the Indira Gandhi International Airport in Delhi by serving 120 million passengers per year over eight runways. The airport is expected to expand in three phases over 30 years and will be one of the world's largest airports upon completion. Phase 1 will be completed in 2024.	
India	Sagarmala	Nationwide		In progress		More than $130 billion	A Ministry of Ports, Shipping and Waterways project meant to enhance the country's logistics sector.	
Indonesia	Jakarta MRT	Jakarta	2013	In progress		$2.86 billion	As of 2019, one of the four planned lines is operational. The next two lines to open are expected to open in 2024 and 2026.	
Indonesia	Greater Jakarta LRT	Jakarta	2004	Completed	2023	$1.58 billion	Phase 1, the Bekasi Line and part of the Cibubur Line, were completed in 2023.	
Indonesia	Jakarta–Bandung HSR	Java	2016	Completed	2023	$5.5 billion	3 of the 4 planned lines have been opened and are operational.	
Indonesia	Trans-Sumatra Toll Road	Sumatra		In progress		$33.2 billion	Of the 17 planned segments, 8 have been completed as of 2019.	
Iran	Tehran-Shomal Freeway	Tehran-Mazandaran province		In progress		About $1 billion USD	Will be 121 km (75 mi) in length. As of 2023, three of the four planned sections are operational.	
Israel	Tel Aviv–Jerusalem railway	Tel Aviv-Jerusalem	2001	Completed		$1.9 - $2.8 billion USD		
Israel	Tel Aviv Light Rail	Tel Aviv Metropolitan Area	2015	In progress		₪187.5 billion	As of 2023, 1 of the 4 planned light rail transit has been completed. Three metro lines will also be constructed.	
Japan	Japan's Maglev High-Speed Rail (Chūō Shinkansen)	Tokyo–Nagoya–Osaka	2014	In progress	2037 (proj.)	¥9 trillion		
Kuwait	Sheikh Jaber Al-Ahmad Al-Sabah Causeway Project	Kuwait Bay	2013	Completed	2019	$3 billion	Launching point of Madinat Al-Hareer in Subiya.	
Kuwait	Kuwait International Airport Passenger Terminal 2	Kuwait City	2017	In progress	2025 (proj.)	$4.3 billion	Construction was delayed due to the COVID-19 pandemic.	
Malaysia	Klang Valley Mass Rapid Transit Project	Kuala Lumpur	2016	In progress	2028 proj.	RM50 billion	When completed, it will be operated as part of the Klang Valley Integrated Transit System.	
Malaysia	MRL East Coast Rail Link (ECRL)	Kelantan, Terengganu, Pahang, Negeri Sembilan, Selangor	2017	In progress	2027 (proj.)	RM44 billion		
Malaysia	Kuala Lumpur International Airport	Selangor	1993	Completed	1998	RM3.92 billion		
Malaysia	Penang Sentral	Penang	2007	Completed	2018	RM230 million		
Malaysia	West Coast Expressway	Selangor and Perak	2014	In progress		RM5.044 billion		
Pakistan	Karachi–Lahore Motorway	Karachi to Peshawar through Islamabad, Lahore, Multan and Sukkur	2015	Completed	2020	$6.6 billion	This six-lane, high-speed, limited-access motorway is 1,694 km (1,053 mi) in length.	
Pakistan	Karachi Circular Railway	Karachi	2001	In progress		$1.6 billion	Revival of the Karachi Circular Railway, which became operational in 1969 and closed in 1999 due to mismanagement. The project includes 23 stations, 3 lines and more than 50 km (31 mi) of track.	
Pakistan	Karachi Metrobus	Karachi	2013	In progress		$400 million	Two of the 6 planned lines are operational.	
Pakistan	Malir Expressway	Karachi	2022	In progress	2024 (proj.)	$400 million	As of August 2023, half of the 40.3 km (25.0 mi) expressway is operational.	
Pakistan	New Gwadar International Airport	Gwadar		Completed	2024	$400 million	This will replace the existing Gwadar International Airport.	
Pakistan	Karachi–Peshawar Railway Line ML-1	Multiple Pakistani provinces	2024 (proj.)	In progress		$7 billion	This renovation is part of the China–Pakistan Economic Corridor.	
Pakistan	Orange Line Metro	Lahore	2015	Completed	2020	$1.500 billion	This is the first of the three planned Lahore Metro lines and is Pakistan's first driverless metro.	
China	China–Pakistan Economic Corridor	Pakistan and Xinjiang, China		In progress		$62 billion	The project aims to connect Gwadar Port to Xinjiang via a network of highways, railways and pipelines to transport oil and gas. The economic corridor is expected to run about 3,000 km (1,900 mi)	
China	Beijing Daxing International Airport	Beijing	2014	Completed	2019	$17 billion		
China	Hong Kong-Zhuhai-Macao Bridge	Pearl River Delta	2009	Completed	2018	$10.600 billion		
Philippines	Bataan–Cavite Interlink Bridge	Bataan-Cavite	2023	In progress		$3.75 billion	A 32 km (20 mi) bridge over Manila Bay that will connect Central and Southern Luzon.	
Philippines	Manila Metro Rail Transit System	Metro Manila	1996	In progress	2028 proj.	$15.845 million	One line operational as of 2020. It is expected to have a total of eight lines with a total length of 142 km (88 mi).	
Philippines	Mindanao Railway expansion	Mindanao						
Philippines	New Manila International Airport	Bulacan	2022	In progress	2027 (proj.)	$14.111 billion	Aims to decongest and eventually replace Ninoy Aquino International Airport. It will be operated by the San Miguel Corporation.	
Philippines	North–South Commuter Railway	Metro Manila, Central Luzon	2019	In progress	2029 proj.	$14.95 billion	The railway will connect Clark International Airport with Metro Manila and Calabarzon.	
Philippines	PNR South Long Haul	Luzon		In progress	2027 (proj.)	$3.45 billion		
Philippines	South Luzon Expressway expansion	Metro Manila, Calabarzon	2006	In progress		$2.278 billion	Includes Toll Road 4 from Calamba to Lucena, Toll Road 5 from Lucena to Matnog, and the Pasig River Expressway.	
Qatar	Doha Metro	Doha		In progress	2026 (proj.)	$36 billion	Construction will add 300 km (190 mi) of track.	
Qatar	Qatar Expressway Programme	Doha		In progress		$28 billion USD (CAPEX)	This programme aims to deliver more than 800 km (500 mi) of new or upgraded roads and more than 200 interchanges in Qatar. It is part of the Qatar National Vision 2030. One of the motivating factors was the 2022 FIFA World Cup.	
Saudi Arabia	King Abdulaziz International Airport expansion	Jeddah	2006	Completed	2019	$7.2 billion		
Saudi Arabia	Riyadh Metro	Riyadh	2014	Completed	2024 (proj.)	$23.5 billion		
Singapore	Cross Island MRT Line	Nationwide	2023	In progress		$40.7 billion SGD		
Singapore	Changi Airport Terminal 5	Asia–Pacific	2022	In progress	Mid-2030s (proj.)	$10 billion USD	The terminal will be able to handle a capacity of 70 million passengers a year upon completion.	
Singapore	Marina Coastal Expressway	Nationwide	2008	Completed	2013	$4.3 billion SGD	First undersea expressway in Singapore.	
Singapore	Tuas Mega Port			In progress		$20 billion	Tuas Port will be able to handle 65 million twenty-foot equivalent units (TEUs) annually, almost double the 36.9 million TEUs that Singapore handled in 2020.	
South Korea	Incheon International Airport	Seoul Capital Area	1992	Completed	2024 (proj.)	Over 3,903₩ trillion	Intended to replace Gimpo International Airport	
Thailand	High-speed rail in Thailand	Central, Western and Southern Thailand		In progress	2037 (proj.)	$30 billion	The project consists of four high-speed rail corridors: one international corridor, which will be a part of the Kunming–Singapore Railway project after completion.	
Vietnam	Long Thanh International Airport	Ho Chi Minh City	2019	In progress	After 2035 (proj.)	$7.8 billion	This project is partially operational.	
UAE	Al Maktoum International Airport	Dubai		In progress	2030 (proj.)	$82 billion	Upon completion, it will be the largest airport in the world.	

=== Europe ===
Country	Project	Location	Start year	Status	End year	Cost	Notes	Ref
Croatia	Pelješac Bridge	Dubrovnik-Neretva County	2018	Completed	2022	Around €420 million (€357 million of EU funds)	The bridge links the Croatian exclave to the rest of the country while bypassing Bosnia and Herzegovina's short coastal strip at Neum.	
Czech Republic	Blanka tunnel complex	Prague	2006	Completed	2015	$1.97 billion	The longest city tunnel in Europe at 5.5 km (3.4 mi)	
Denmark/Germany	Fehmarn Belt fixed link	Lolland, Fehmarn	2021	In progress	2029	€10 billion	An immersed tunnel connection the Danish island of Lolland with the German island of Fehmarn.	
European Union	TEN-T Core Network	Europe		In progress		More than €600 billion	The purpose of the project is to connect nine European Corridors. The Trans-European conventional rail network is part of the EU megaproject to help alleviate and assist in the transport of goods throughout the 27 EU member states.	
France	Grand Paris Express	Paris	2015	In progress	2030 (proj.)	$45 billion	Lines will be opened in stages between 2024 and 2030.	
Germany	German Reunification Transport Projects Number 8	Berlin Central Station and Nuremberg Main Station		In progress		$10 billion	Proposed after German Reunification, this is a set of major construction projects meant to increase and improve transport links between East and West Germany.	
Greece	Athens Metro	Athens	2021	In progress	2032 (proj.)	€5.75 billion	Lines 1, 2 and 3 are already operational and are undergoing upgrades.	
Greece	Egnatia Odos	Igoumenitsa-Kipoi	1994	Completed	2009	€5.93 billion	This project was built alongside the general route of the ancient Roman Via Egnatia and consisted of 670 km (420 mi) of motorways.	
Greece	Egnatia Railway	Alexandroupolis-Igoumenitsa		Approved		€10 billion	Proposed in 2017; upon completion, it will be Europe's largest railway megaproject.	
Greece	A5 motorway (Ionia Odos)	Ioannina-Gulf of Corinth	2006	Completed	2017	Over €1.1 billion	As part of this project, 196 km (122 mi) of motorways were built.	
Greece	Thessaloniki Metro	Thessaloniki	2006	Completed	2024 / 2026	€2.26 billion	The purpose of the project is to create a 35-station underground rapid transit system in Greece's second-largest city. Construction was delayed due to the Greek government-debt crisis.	
Greece	Thessaloniki–Kavala–Xanthi railway	Northern Greece	2025	In progress	2030s (proj.)	€1.25 billion	A new electrified railway line running parallel to the A2 motorway, cutting travel times and will replace the existing Thessaloniki–Alexandroupoli railway which was built during the Ottoman Empire. It forms part of the Egnatia Railway.	
Greece	Tithorea-Domokos bypass	Phthiotis Municipality	1997	Completed	2019	€1.8 billion	A total of 106 km (66 mi) of high-speed railways were built as a bypass to the existing conventional mountainous railway line linking Thessaloniki with Athens, including 35.5 km (22.1 mi) of tunnels and 6.8 km (4.2 mi) of bridges.	
Italy	Strait of Messina Bridge	Sicily and Calabria	2024	Proposed	2032	€11 billion	If fully approved and built, the bridge will be the longest suspension bridge in the world, surpassing the 1915 Çanakkale Bridge in Turkey, the world's current longest suspension bridge span as this Messina Bridge will be 60% more than the main span. The bridge could also potentially be part of the Berlin–Palermo railway axis (Line 1) of the Trans-European Transport Networks (TEN-T).	
Montenegro	Bar-Boljare motorway	Bar, Boljare	2015	In progress	2022	$3 billion	The highway is 40.871 km (25.396 mi) long ad tunnels and bridges make up about 60% of the entire route. The first section between Podgorica and Mateševo opened in July 2022.	
Norway	Coastal Highway E39	Trondheim-Kristiansand	2018	In progress		382 kr billion	The purpose of the project is to replace all ferry links along the route with fixed connections to reduce travel time from 21 hours to 11 hours. Construction is uncertain and each project will be evaluated separately.	
Norway	InterCity	Østlandet		In progress	2034 (proj.)	50 kr billion (2022)	Project to connect all major towns in the vicinity of Oslo by a double-rail line.	
Norway	Fornebu Line	Oslo, Bærum	2020	In progress	2027 (proj.)	13.32 kr billion	A new metro line stretching from Majorstuen to Fornebu through Oslo.	
Poland	Central Transport Hub	Baranów	2026	In progress	2032 (proj.)	More than $8 billion	Airport, train station and road hub.	
Portugal	Vasco da Gama Bridge	Lisbon	1995	Completed	1998	$1.1 billion	It is the longest bridge in Europe (including viaducts), with a total length of 12.3 km (7.6 mi), including 0.8 km (0.50 mi) for the main bridge and 11.5 km (7.1 mi) in viaducts.	
Portugal	Porto–Lisbon high-speed rail line	Porto-Lisbon		In progress	2030+(proj.)	€4.5 billion	When completed, the project will shorten journey time between the two cities to 75 minutes.	
Serbia	Belgrade Metro	Belgrade	2021	In progress	2028 (proj.)	$5 billion	This construction will includes 43 stations and 2 lines.	
Serbia	Belgrade-Boljare motorway	Belgrade, Boljare		In progress		$2.5 billion	Part of the Belgrade-Bar motorway. The second section is the most expensive section of the entire motorway due to unfavourable terrain, requiring the construction of many tunnels and bridges.	
Serbia	Belgrade Waterfront	Belgrade	2014	In progress		$3.5 billion	An urban renewal development project.	
Serbia-Hungary	Budapest–Belgrade railway	Budapest-Belgrade	2021	In progress		Around $5 billion	This will connect the two capitals by high-speed rail. This is stage one of the Budapest–Belgrade–Skopje–Athens railway, which itself is part of China's Belt and Road Initiative.	
Serbia / North Macedonia / Greece	Morava-Vardar Canal	Serbia, North Macedonia, Greece		Proposed		$17 billion	This would make Great Morava and South Morava accessible to boats from Thessaloniki and make Morava and Vardar navigable rivers, and clean them for passage of boats. China has a vested interest in building the canal.	
Slovenia	Divača–Koper Railway upgrade	Slovenia	2021	In progress	2025 (proj.)	$1.175 billion	This 27.1 km (16.8 mi) railway will better connect inland regions with the seaside and port of Koper.	
Switzerland	Gotthard Base Tunnel	Alps	1999	Completed	2015	CHF 9.56 billion	At 57 km (35 mi), it became the world's longest and deepest rail tunnel upon its completion in 2015.	
Turkey	1915 Çanakkale Bridge	Çanakkale	2017	Completed	2022	$2.7 billion	The bridge is the longest suspension bridge in the world	
Turkey	Eurasia Tunnel	Istanbul	2011	Completed	2016	$1.24 billion	It is the first road tunnel connecting the Asian and European continents underneath the seafloor.	
Turkey	Istanbul Airport	Istanbul	2014	Completed	2018	$22 billion	It replaced the existing Atatürk Airport.	
Turkey	Marmaray	Istanbul	2004	Completed	2013	$4.1 billion	Marmaray is the first standard gauge rail connection between Europe and Asia.	
Turkey	Osmangazi Bridge	Gebze	2013	Completed	2016	$1.2 billion	The bridge was upon opening the longest suspension bridge in Turkey	
Turkey	Yavuz Sultan Selim Bridge	Istanbul	2013	Completed	2016	$4.5 billion	It is one of the world's widest suspension bridge	
United Kingdom	Expansion of Heathrow Airport	London		Proposed		$25.24 billion USD	This construction would add a third runway and an additional terminal.	
United Kingdom	Irish Sea Bridge	Irish Sea	-	Cancelled		£335 billion	Abandoned due to cost.	
United Kingdom	High Speed 2	Greater London, South East England, West Midlands	2020	In progress, partially cancelled	2040 (proj.)	£98 billion		
United Kingdom	London Crossrail Project Elizabeth line	Greater London, Berkshire, Buckinghamshire, Essex	2009	Completed	2022	£18.8 billion	Fully operational by May 2023.	
United Kingdom	M8 motorway	Glasgow-Edinburgh	2015	Completed	2017	£30 million		
United Kingdom	Northern Powerhouse Rail	Northern England		Proposed	2033 (proj.)	£14.75 billion	Sometimes referred to as High Speed 3.	
United Kingdom	East West Rail	Southern England	2011	In progress	2030s (proj)	£1.085 billion	Under construction	
United Kingdom	Oxford–Cambridge Expressway	Southern England	2016	Cancelled		£3 billion (est)	Cancelled due to cost in 2021	
United Kingdom	Lower Thames Crossing	Kent, Essex	2009	Proposed	2031 (est)	£9 billion (est)		
United Kingdom	Crossrail 2	Surrey, Greater London,Hertfordshire	2020s (planned)	Proposed	2030s to 2040s	£31.2 billion (est)	On hold due to COVID-19	

=== North America ===
Country	Project	Location	Start year	Status	End year	Cost	Notes	Ref
Canada	Trans Mountain Expansion Project	Edmonton, Alberta to Burnaby, British Columbia	2004	Completed	2024	CA$34 billion	Pipeline expansion constructed in stages along the existing Trans Mountain Line from Edmonton to Burnaby. The pipeline looped Kinder Morgan's existing 60 cm pipeline with a new 76 cm pipeline. TMX-1, the Anchor Loop, was completed in 2008 including 7 new pump stations and upgrading 6 existing pump stations ($210 million). TMX-2 included 243 km of 30- and 36-inch pipe between Valemount, British Columbia and Kamloops and back to Edmonton. In spring 2012, Kinder Morgan received customer commitment resulting in an increased planned expansion to 750,000 barrels/day. A total of 900 km of twinned pipeline was part of the expansion project. Regulatory approval was received from the National Energy Board, and a final investment decision was reached in May 2017. Construction of the pipeline was completed with commissioning taking place in spring 2024.	
Canada	Southwest Calgary Ring Road	Calgary	2016	Completed	2021	More than $5 billion	Part of the CANAMEX Corridor and the Stoney Trail.	
Canada	West Calgary Ring Road	Calgary	2019	Completed	19 December 2023	More than $1 billion		
Canada	Calgary LRT Expansion	Calgary	2022	In progress	2026 (proj.)	More than $4.5 billion		
Canada	New Champlain Bridge Corridor Project	Québec	2015	Completed	2019	$4.24 billion	Replaced the existing Champlain Bridge.	
Canada	Confederation Bridge	The Maritimes	1993	Completed	1997	$1.3 billion	The 12.9 km (8.0 mi) bridge is the longest bridge in the world crossing ice-covered water.	
Canada	Confederation Line	Ottawa	2013	Completed	2019	$2.1 billion	The largest project in Ottawa since the Rideau Canal.	(Phase 1).
Canada	Crowchild Trail Upgrades	Calgary	After 2027 (proj.)	Approved	2030 (proj.)	More than $3 billion		
Canada	Gordie Howe International Bridge	Windsor, Ontario	2018	Completed	2026	$5.7 billion	International cable stayed bridge over the Detroit River between Canada and the United States.	
Canada	Line 5 Eglinton	Toronto	2011	Completed	2026	$9.1 billion		
Canada	Port Mann Bridge	Vancouver	2009	Completed	2015	$1.93 billion	The widest bridge in the world at the time of opening. The cable-stayed bridge uses 288 cables to reach the total bridge length of 6,866 ft (2,093 m)	
Canada	Broadway Subway	Vancouver	2019	In progress	2027	$2.95 billion	The Broadway Subway Project is a 5.7 km extension of the Millennium Line, from VCC-Clark Station to Broadway and Arbutus.	
Canada	Réseau Express Métropolitain	Montréal	2018	In progress	2027 (proj.)	$6.95 billion	Partly operational beginning in July 2023, with other parts expecting to be opened in stages between 2024 and 2027.	
Costa Rica	Orotina Mega Airport	Orotina						
Costa Rica	Green Costa Rican Canal							
Costa Rica	Electric Train of The Great Metropolitan Area							
Mexico	Durango-Mazatlán Highway	Durango-Sinaloa	2008	Completed	2012	$1.4 billion	The Baluarte Bridge, which is part of the highway, received a Guinness World Record for being the highest suspension bridge in western Mexico.	
Mexico	Mexico City Texcoco Airport	Mexico City	-	Cancelled	-	$13.3 billion	After taking office, President Andrés Manuel López Obrador cancelled this mega-project in favor of a "metropolitan airport system", which kept the two-runway Mexico City International Airport from being decommissioned.	
Mexico	Felipe Ángeles International Airport	Mexico City	2019	In progress	2032–2050 (proj.)	$7.1 billion	The airport's first terminal and two runways were opened in 2022, though long-term expansion projects and master plan completions extend out toward 2032 and 2050.	
Panama	4th bridge over the Panama Canal	Panama Canal		In progress		$1.4 billion		
Panama	Panama Metro line 1	Panama City	2010	Completed	2014	$1.8 billion		
Panama	Panama Metro line 2	Panama City	2015	Completed	2019	$2 billion		
Panama	Panama Metro line 3	Panama City	2021	In progress	2028 (proj.)	$2.6 billion		
United States	Alaskan Way Viaduct replacement tunnel	Seattle	2007	Completed	2019	$3.1 billion		
United States	Big Dig	Boston	1991	Completed	2007	$14.6 billion	($24.3 billion after interest)	
United States	Brightline West	Las Vegas Valley-Greater Los Angeles	2023 (proj.)	In progress	2027 (proj.)	$10 billion	This link would connect with the California High-Speed Rail.	
United States	California High-Speed Rail	Los Angeles-San Francisco	2015	In progress	2030 (proj.)	$100 billion	A 1,300 km (810 mi) high-speed rail system is expected to be completed in phases up to 2030.	
United States	Chicago Region Environmental and Transportation Efficiency Program	Chicago		In progress	2025 (proj.)	$4.6 billion	CREATE is a railway improvement program consisting of 70 projects, including the construction of grade separations, overpasses, and other rail projects.	
United States	East Side Access	Manhattan and Queens	2007	Completed	2023	More than $11.1 billion	This network expansion project intended to increase direct services into Grand Central Terminal and decrease congestion in Midtown Manhattan. It also provides regular access from the New Haven and Hudson Lines to Penn Station.	
United States	Evergreen Point Floating Bridge	Seattle	2011	Completed	2016	$4.56 billion	This 2,350 m (7,710 ft) long floating bridge is the longest of its type in the world; its predecessor previously held the title.	
United States	Hampton Roads Bridge–Tunnel Expansion	Hampton Roads	2020	In progress	2027 (proj.)	More than $3.9 billion	This project will widen the current four-lane segments to eight lanes along nearly 10 mi (16 km) of the Hampton Roads Beltway corridor from Hampton to Norfolk, Virginia with new twin tunnels.	
United States	Interstate Highway System	Nationwide	1956	Completed	2018	$500 billion		
United States	John F. Kennedy International Airport Redevelopment	New York City	2020	In progress	2026 (proj.)	$19 billion	Phase 1, which covers Terminals 1, 4, 6, and 8, is expected to be completed by 2026. The redevelopment project aims to rebuild passenger facilities and approaches to the airport.	
United States	LaGuardia Airport Project	New York City	2016	Completed	2022	$8 billion	A complete retrofit of the airport was completed on time and on budget by 2022.	
United States	Los Angeles International Airport	Los Angeles	2017	In progress	2028 (proj.)	$14 billion	Renovation of existing terminals, as well as new terminals and infrastructure.	
United States	Newark Airport Terminal A	Newark	2018	Completed	2023	$14 billion	Construction added a new parking garage, 33 gates, and a walkway connecting the AirTrain, parking garage, and terminal.	
United States	Norfolk Southern Railway Crescent Corridor Expansion	Northeast to Southeast regions; New York and Philadelphia to Atlanta and New Orleans	2010	Completed	2013	$2.5 billion	A public-private partnership between Norfolk Southern (NS), the Federal Government, and the various state governments impacted by the 2,500 mi (4,000 km) corridor. Project involved construction of 4 new intermodal terminals, expansion of several other NS railyards, and double-tracking and siding improvements at strategic locations along the corridor.	
United States	O'Hare Modernization Plan	Chicago	2001	Completed	2021	$8.8 billion	Chicago's O'Hare Modernization Plan is a massive project transforming the airport's airfield and terminals for a 21st-century global hub, featuring new runways for efficiency, expanded concourses (like Concourse D), a new Global Terminal, upgraded T5, better roadways, and improved passenger experience.	
United States	Ohio River Bridges Project	Louisville, Kentucky	2014	Completed	2016	$2.3 billion	The project involved reconstructing the Kennedy Interchange, the completion of two new Ohio River bridges and the reconstruction of ramps on Interstate 65. The final project omitted some features of the original plan.	
United States	Project Connect	Austin, Texas	2021	In progress	2034	$7.1 billion	Public transit expansion including the construction of two new light rail lines, a new commuter rail line, and a bus rapid transit line. The project has undergone several cuts since its passing in 2020.	
United States	Puget Sound Gateway Program	Seattle & Tacoma, Washington	2015	In progress	2028 (proj.)	$2.38 billion	This project includes the completion of SR 167 between Puyallup and Tacoma and of SR 509 from I-5 to Burien.	
United States	Reagan Airport's Project Journey	Washington, D.C.	2018	Completed	2021	$1 billion	This renovation introduced a new security building and checkpoints and added a new 14-gate concourse.	
United States	San Francisco International Airport Redevelopment	San Francisco	2016	Completed	2024	$2.4 billion	The airport began a multiphase renovation project to turn Terminal 1 into a more environmentally friendly passenger facility.	
United States	Eastern span replacement of the San Francisco–Oakland Bay Bridge	San Francisco-Oakland, California	2002	Completed	2013	$6.4 billion	The eastern span replacement of the San Francisco–Oakland Bay Bridge was a construction project to replace a seismically unsound portion of the Bay Bridge with a new self-anchored suspension bridge (SAS) and a pair of viaducts. The bridge is in the U.S. state of California and crosses the San Francisco Bay between Yerba Buena Island and Oakland.	
United States	Second Avenue Subway Project	Manhattan	1972	In progress	2027 (proj.)	$17 billion	The proposed full line would be 13.7 km (8.5 mi) long, with 16 stations and a projected ridership of 560,000 people. Phase 1 opened in 2017.	
United States	Washington Metro Silver Line	Washington, D.C.	2009	Completed	2022	$6.8 billion	Phase 1 included the creation of a new line through Tysons which opened in 2014. Phase 2 expanded this line to Dulles International Airport and beyond, and opened in 2022.	
United States	Sound Transit 3	Seattle	Late 2020s (proj.)	Planned	2041 (proj.)	$50 billion	This project is to expand the current light rail and bus system currently used by the city and is to be completed in stages from 2024 to 2041.	

North American megaprojects
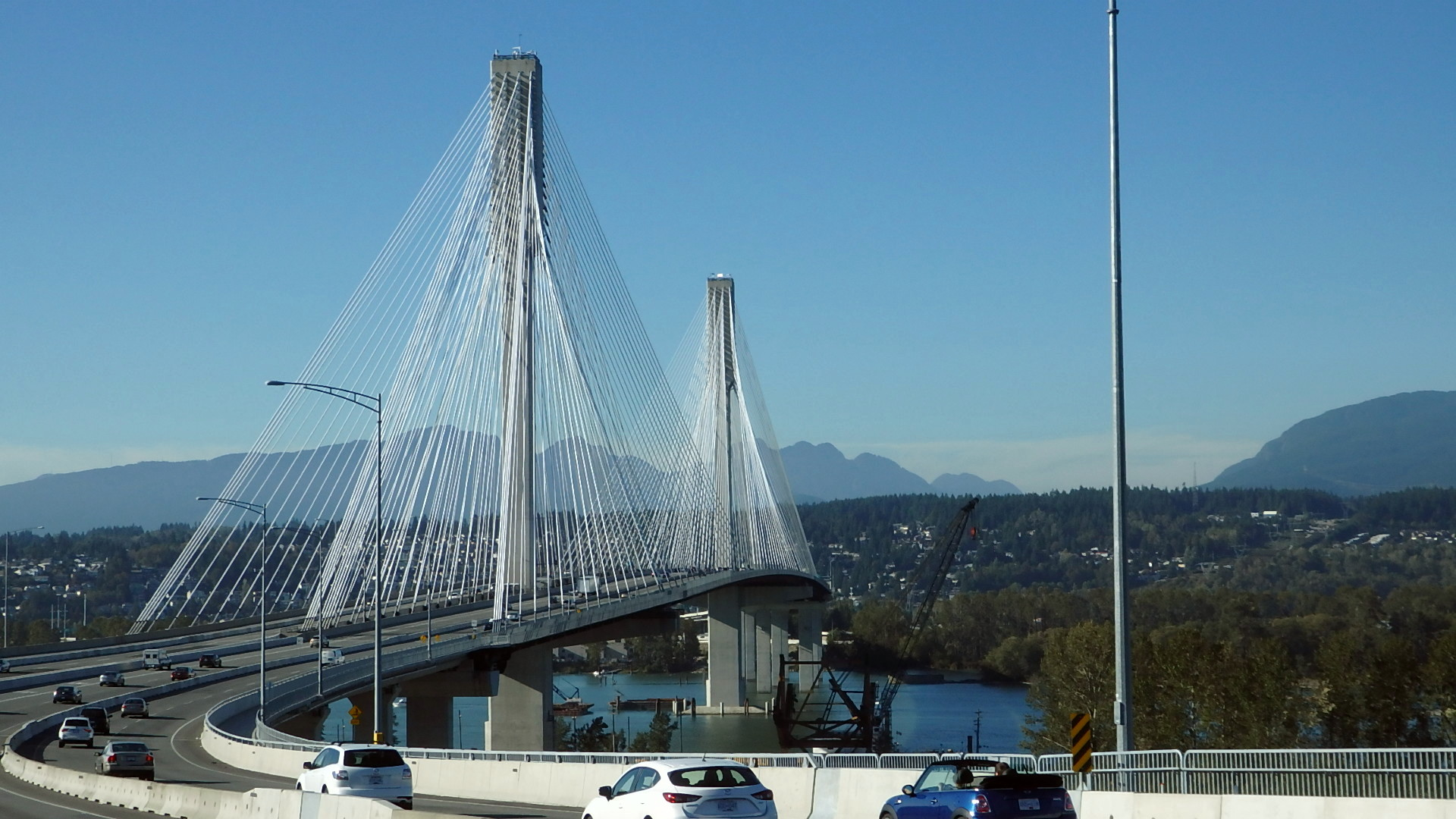
Vancouver's new Port Mann Bridge with the old bridge fully demolished

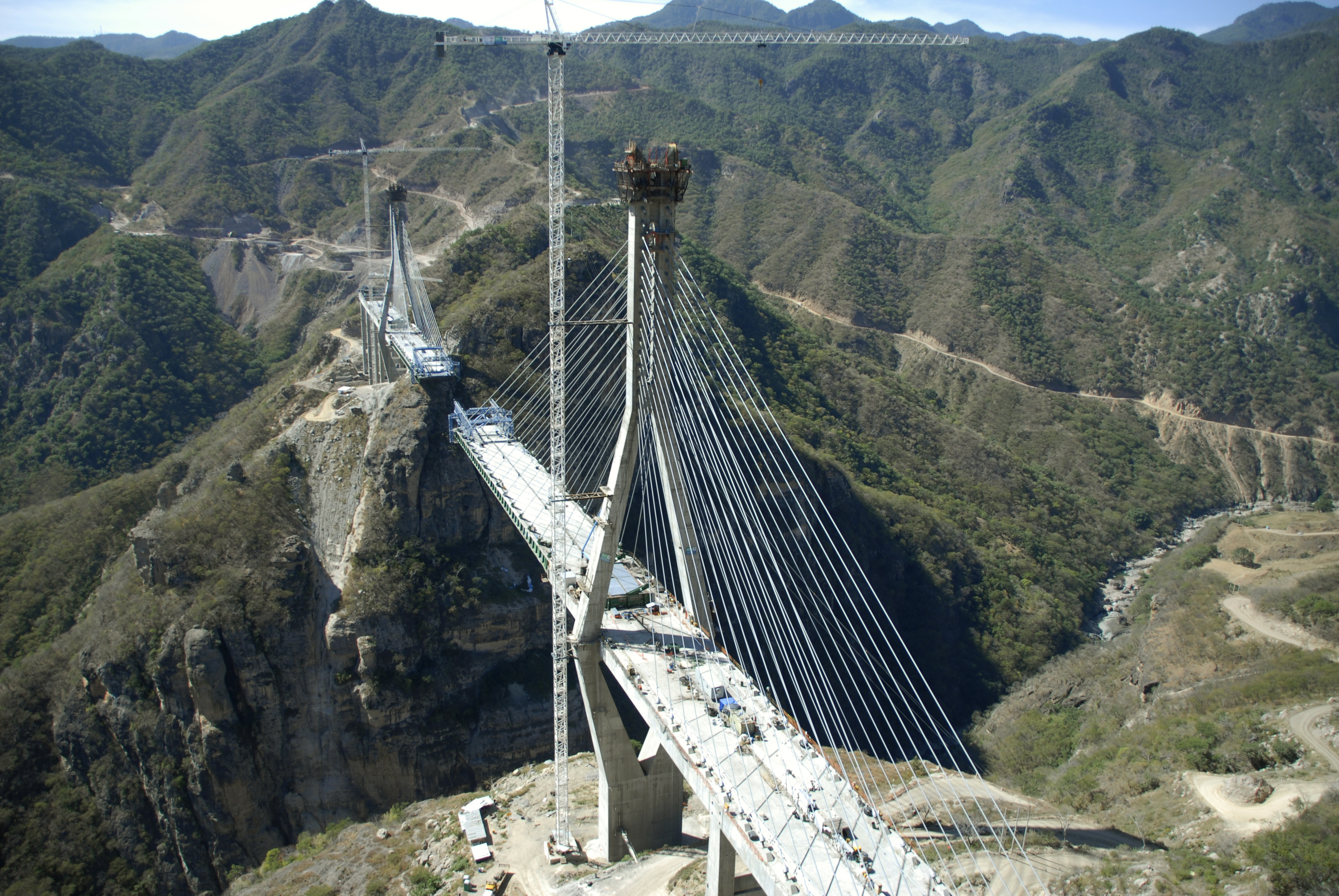
Baluarte Bridge under construction, 2023

Boston's highway system before and after the Big Dig

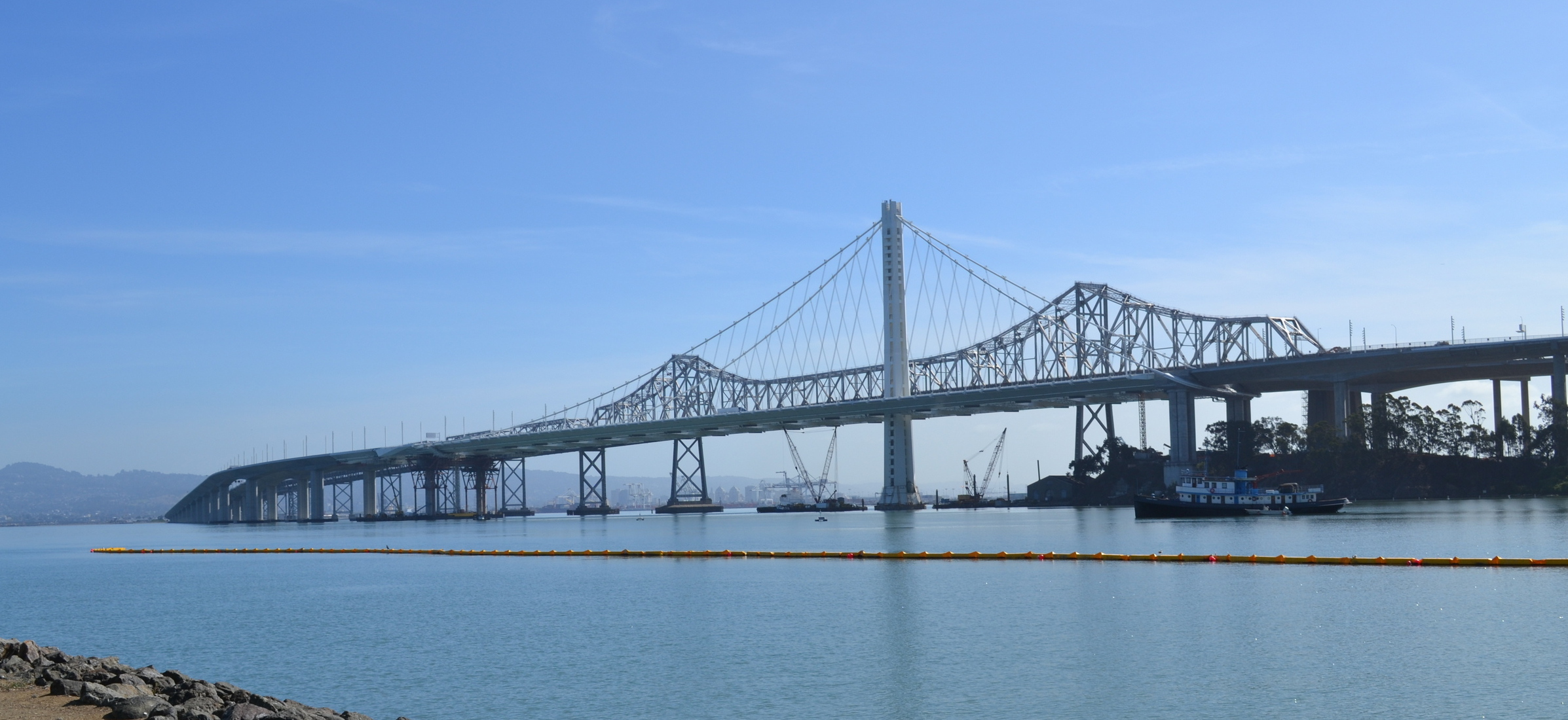
The completed replacement and the old eastern span of the San Francisco-Oakland Bay Bridge (2013)

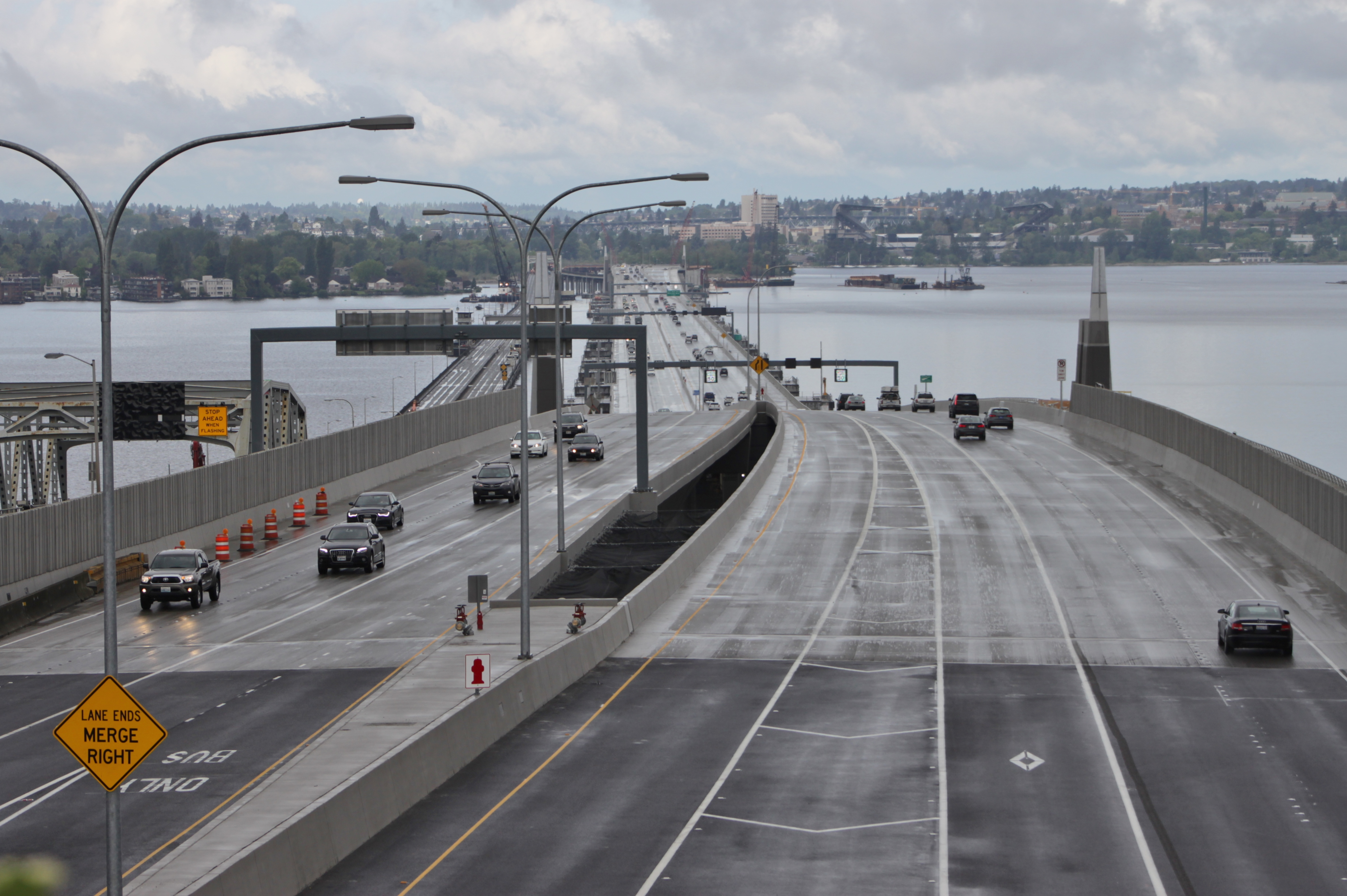
Evergreen Point Floating Bridge viewed from the east end in Medina shortly after opening in April 2016

=== South America ===
Country	Project	Location	Start year	Status	End year	Cost	Notes	Ref
Brazil	São Paulo Metro	São Paulo	1968	Under construction		$22.5 billion	Continuous expansion over decades. Largest subway system in Latin America.	
Brazil	Rio–Niterói Bridge	Rio de Janeiro	1969	Completed	1974			
Brazil	Trans-Amazonian Highway	North and Northeast Region of Brazil	1970	Completed	1972	$1.5 billion		
Brazil	Great Carajás Project	Pará and Maranhão	1978	Completed	1986	$2.9 billion	Construction of the Carajás Railway and Ponta da Madeira Port, along with investments in the Carajás mine and its processing plant.	
Brazil	North–South Railway	National	1987	Completed	2023	$2.6 billion		
Brazil	Transnordestina Railway	Northeast Region of Brazil	2006	Under construction	2029 (proj.)	$2.8 billion		
Brazil	West–East Integration Railway	Bahia and Tocantins	2011	Under construction	2027 (proj.)	$1 billion		

=== Oceania ===
Country	Project	Location	Start year	Status	End year	Cost	Notes	Ref
Australia	Central station Redevelopment	Sydney-Eveleigh		Proposed		$10 billion	Extension of Sydney's CBD with an approximately 3 km (1.9 mi) long renewal corridor	
Australia	Cross River Rail	Brisbane	2017	In progress	2026 (proj.)	$5.4 billion	Upon completion, it will be the first rail-only Brisbane River crossing since the completion of the Merivale Bridge in 1978	
Australia	Metro Tunnel	Melbourne	2017	Completed	2025	$11 billion	This construction includes two 9 km (5.6 mi) rail tunnels and five new underground stations.	
Australia	North East Link	Melbourne	2020	In progress	2028 (proj.)	$15.8 billion	This will connect the M80 Ring Road to the Eastern Freeway.	
Australia	OneSKY	Canberra		In progress	2024 (proj.)	$2 billion	Replacement for the Australian Advanced Air Traffic System.	
Australia	Suburban Rail Loop	Melbourne	2022	In progress	2050 (proj.)	$50 billion	The East and North sections, the two main ones, are planned to form a single 60 km (37 mi), fully automated orbital metro line through the middle suburbs. Construction began on SRL East in 2022.	
Australia	NorthConnex	Sydney	2015	Completed	2020	$2.65 billion	9-kilometre twin-tunnel motorway in Sydney, Australia, connecting the M1 Pacific Motorway (Wahroonga) to the M2 Hills Motorway (West Pennant Hills)	
Australia	WestConnex	Sydney	2017	Completed	2023	$45 billion (2017)	33 km (21 mi) of new and expanded motorways, largest road tunnelling project in Australia.	
Australia	Sydney Metro City & Southwest	Sydney	2017	Completed	2026	$20.5 billion (2023)	30 km (19 mi) rapid transit railway line.	
Australia	Sydney Metro West	Sydney	2020	In progress	2032/2033 (proj.)	$27 billion AUD	24 km (15 mi) rapid transit railway line.	
Australia	Inland Rail	Melbourne–Parkes	2018	In progress	2030–31 (proj.)	$31 billion AUD (2022)	1,600 km (990 mi) freight rail line between Melbourne and Parkes, was originally planned to extended to Brisbane	
Australia	Western Sydney Airport	Greater Sydney	2018	Completed	2026 (proj.)	$5.3 billion	Airport in Luddenham and Badgerys Creek	
Australia	Western Harbour Tunnel	Sydney Harbour	2021	In progress	2028 (proj.)	$14 billion	The six lane, 6.5-kilometre (4.0 mi) twin tunnels will run from Cammeray to Rozelle, passing beneath Sydney Harbour	

== Planned cities and urban renewal projects ==
=== Africa ===
Country	Project	Location	Start year	Status	End year	Cost	Notes	Ref
Egypt	Madinaty	Cairo Governorate	2006	In progress		$10 billion	Housing project.	
Egypt	New Administrative Capital	Cairo Governorate	2015	Completed	2024	$250 billion	Phase 1 of 3 is completed; phase 2 to start construction in 2026. The full project is expected to house 6,500,000 people.	
Egypt	New Alamein City	Matrouh Governorate	2015	In progress		$60 billion	Construction is spread out over three phases.	
Egypt	Galala City	Suez Governorate	2018	In progress		$63 billion	Construction is spread out over three phases. Phase 1 has been completed.	
Egypt	New Mansoura City	Cairo Governorate	2017	In progress		$3.7 billion		
Ethiopia	Chaka Project	Addis Ababa	2022	In progress		$16 billion		
Kenya	Konza Technopolis	Konza		Planned		$14.5 billion	Part of Kenya Vision 2030.	
Nigeria	Abuja	Federal Capital Territory	1980s	Completed			Abuja has been the capital of Nigeria since 1991 and is among the four largest urban areas in Nigeria.	
Nigeria	Asokoro Island	Abuja		In progress		$1 billion	A peninsula development located in Abuja's Asokoro district on approximately 60 hectares (150 acres) of land.	
Nigeria	Centenary City	Federal Capital Territory	2014	In progress		$18 billion	A planned smart city to mark the country's centennial anniversary. It is expected to house 400,000 residents.	
Nigeria	Eko Atlantic	Lagos State	2007	In progress		$6 billion	This planned city is being built on land reclaimed from the Atlantic Ocean. Upon completion, the project anticipates at least 250,000 residents and an additional daily flow of 150,000 commuters.	
Nigeria	Festac Town Phase 2	Lagos State		In progress		$2.4 billion	Phase 2 of the development was approved in 2014.	
Nigeria	Lekki	Lagos State		In progress			Phase 1 was completed and is currently in use. Other phases of the project include areas for free-trade zones, an airport, and a seaport. The completed city is expected to accommodate more than 3.4 million residents with an influx of 1.9 million commuters.	
South Africa	Modderfontein New City	Johannesburg Metropolitan Municipality	-	Abandoned	-	$7.8 billion		

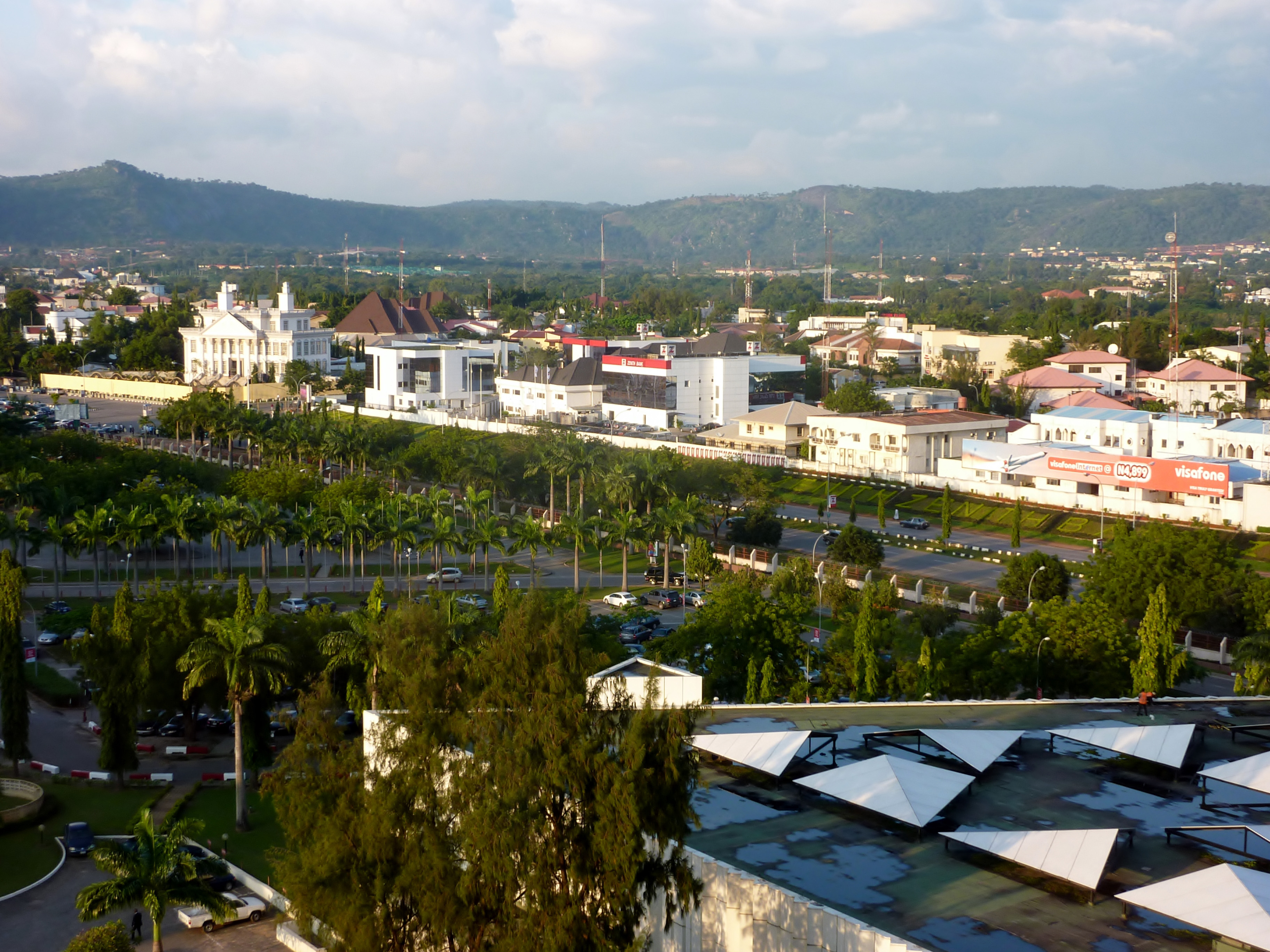
Abuja was the fastest growing city in the world between 2000 and 2010.

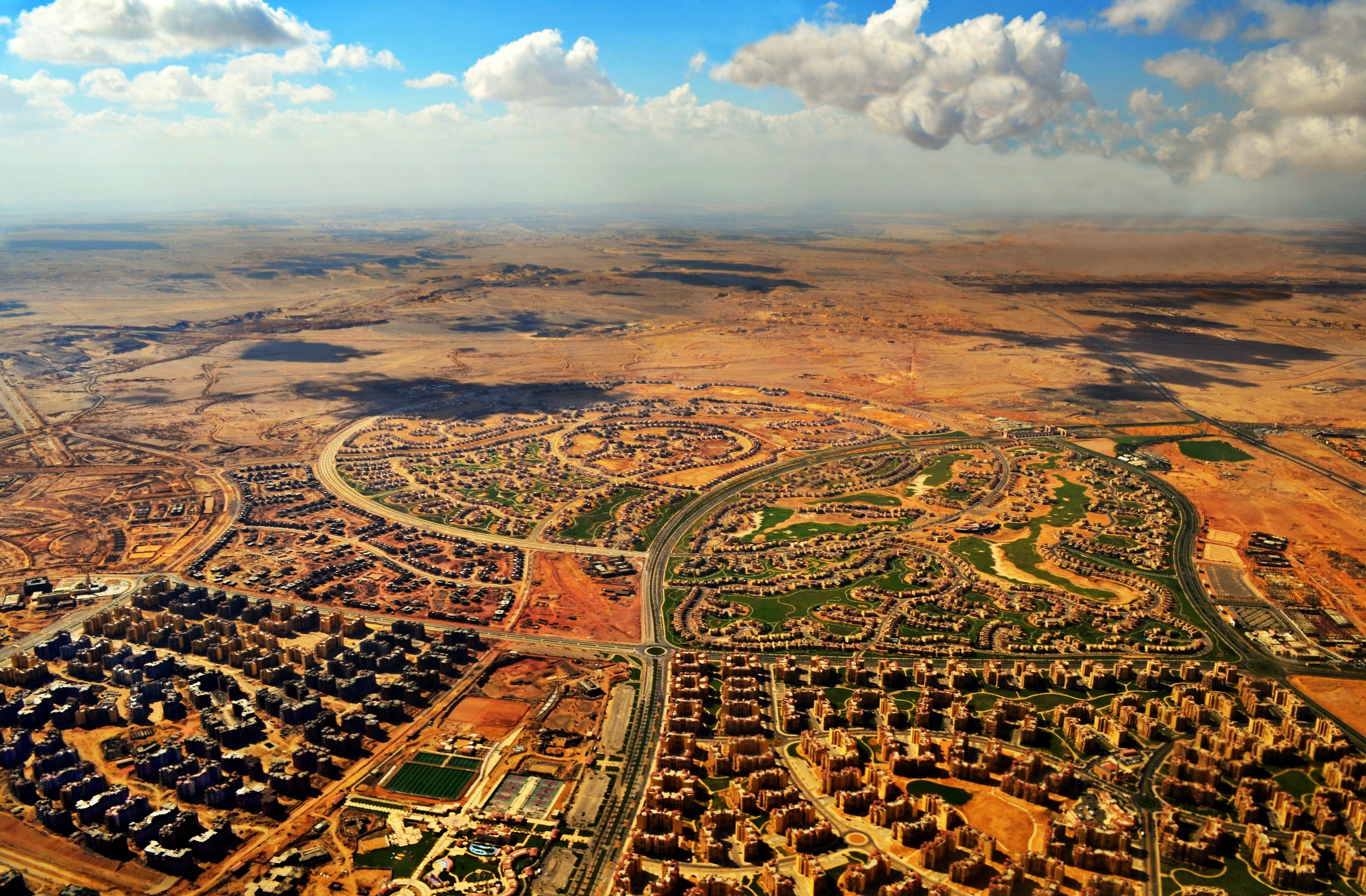
Aerial shot of Madinaty.

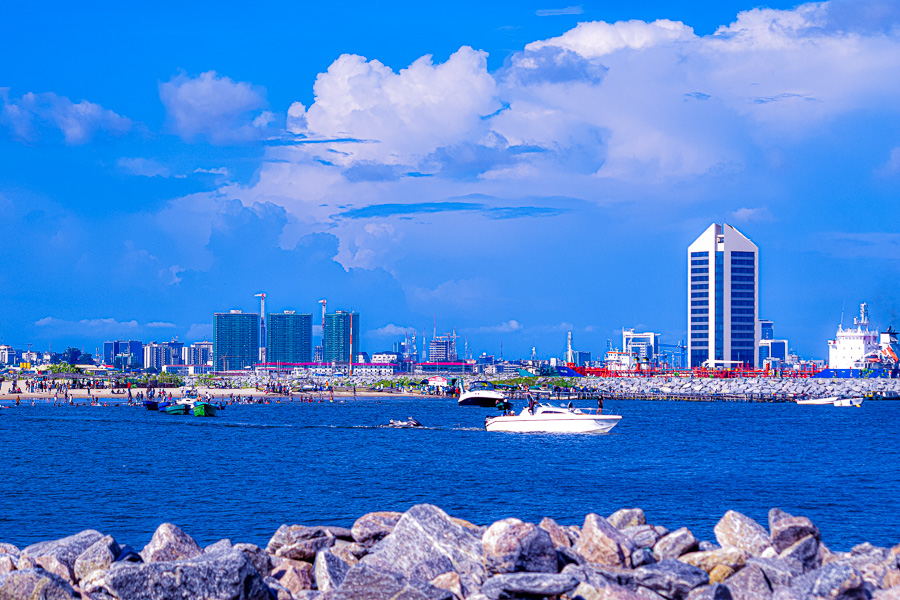
The Eko Atlantic skyline from Tarkwa Bay Beach.

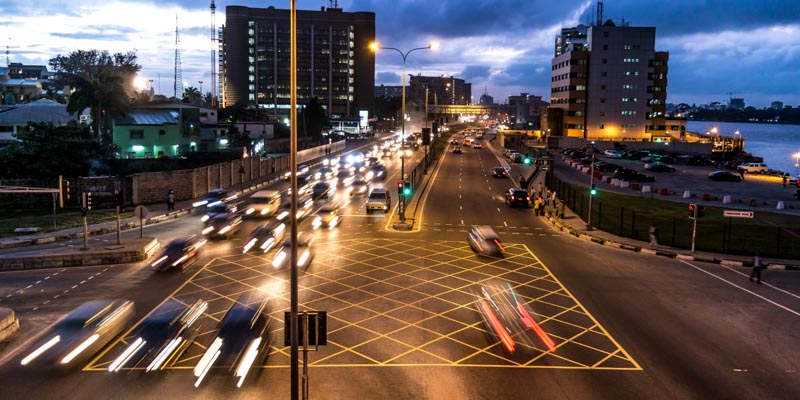
The Lekki-Epe Expressway in Lekki.

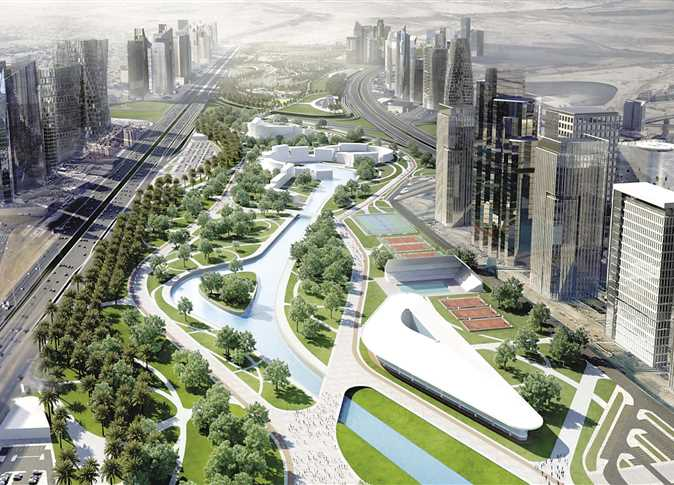
Green River Park in the New Administrative Capital

=== Asia ===
Country	Project	Location	Start year	Status	End year	Cost	Notes	Ref
Azerbaijan	Khazar Islands	Baku Archipelago		Stalled		$100 billion USD	Artificial archipelago consisting of 41 islands spreading 3,000 hectares (7,400 acres). It is expected to house 1 million people upon completion.	
India	Chennai Bangalore Industrial Corridor	Chennai-Bangalore		In progress				
India	Delhi Mumbai Industrial Corridor	Delhi-Mumbai		In progress	2037 (proj.)	$90 billion	The project aims to create seven smart cities distributed along the backbone of the freight corridor between Delhi and Mumbai.	
India	Dholera SIR	Gujarat		Planned	Before 2040 (proj.)		Part of India's Smart Cities Mission.	
India	Gujarat International Finance Tec-City	Gujarat	2007	In progress	2025 (proj.)	$20 billion	India's first International Financial Services Centre. The city is operational, with the fourth and final phase of the project commencing in 2021.	
India	Mumbai-Bangalore Economic Corridor	Bangalore-Mumbai		Proposed				
India	Navi Mumbai	India		In progress		$13.4 billion	World's largest planned city. Contains a population of 2.6 million.	
India	Visakhapatnam–Chennai Industrial Corridor	Vizag-Chennai		Proposed			Part of the East Coast Economic Corridor.	
Indonesia	Ancol Dreamland	Jakarta		Completed			600 hectares (1,500 acres) integrated tourism area.	
Indonesia	BSD City	Greater Jakarta		Completed	1989		6,000 hectares (15,000 acres)	
Indonesia	Lippo Cikarang	Greater Jakarta	1990	Completed		$18.75 billion	A township and industrial park on 332 hectares (820 acres) of land.	
Indonesia	Pantai Indah Kapuk	Jakarta		Completed			A prestigious gated community.	
Indonesia	Nusantara	Modern-day East Kalimantan	2022	In progress			Set to replace Jakarta as the capital.	
Iran	Iran Mall	Tehran	2010	Completed	2018	200,000 billion IRR CBI Rate equivalent US$5.2 billion	The project spans more than 1.6 million m^{2} (17 million sq ft) that includes shopping mall, two tower, two 5-star hotels, and a lake.	
Iraq	The Bride of the Gulf	Basra		Proposed			Part of Basra's project to rebuild.	
Iraq	Bismayah city	Baghdad		In progress		$10 billion	Part of Iraq plan to rebuild the country	
Iraq	Iraq gate	Baghdad		Completed	2024	750 million	Part of Iraq's plan to expand the real estate market	
Iraq	Baghdad Meteo	Baghdad		In progress	2029	$17 billion	World's 2nd largest driverless metro	
Japan	Roppongi Hills	Tokyo	2000	Completed	2003	$4 billion USD	One of Japan's largest integrated property developments.	
Japan	Sky Mile Tower	Tokyo		Proposed	2045 (proj.)		If built, construction would conclude around 2045. The tower would stand 1.7 km (5,600 ft) high and have a capacity of around 55,000 people.	
Jordan	Abdali Project	Amman		In progress		$5 billion USD	This project is being developed on 384,000 m^{2} (0.148 mi^{2}) of land, intending to create a total built-up area of over 1,700,000 m^{2} (0.66 mi^{2}).	
Kuwait	Madinat al-Hareer	Kuwait	2019	In progress		$632 billion USD	A 250 km^{2} (62,000 acres) planned urban area.	
Malaysia	Forest City	Johor Bahru		In progress	2035 (proj.)	$100 billion USD	A private town on reclaimed land.	
Malaysia	Iskandar Malaysia	Johor Bahru	2006	In progress		$100 billion USD		
Malaysia	KL River City	Kuala Lumpur		In progress		Rm16.5 billion	Rehabilitation project along the Gombak River.	
Malaysia	Melaka Gateway	Malacca City	2014	In progress	2025 (proj.)	$400 billion USD		
Malaysia	Merdeka 118	Kuala Lumpur	2016	Completed	2023	Rm5 billion	Upon completion, it became the tallest building in Malaysia.	
Malaysia	Putrajaya	Sepang District	1995	Completed		$8.1 billion USD	In 1999, most of the seats of government moved from Kuala Lumpur to Putrajaya.	
Pakistan	Bahria Paradise	Karachi		In progress			Part of Bahria Town	
Pakistan	Bahria Town	Karachi	2014	In progress		$1 billion USD	A gated community near Karachi.	
Pakistan	Bundel Island City	Karachi		Proposed		$50 billion USD	While the project has been long proposed, it has never materialized due to environmental concerns, especially the threat to mangroves, and objections from the Sindh Government.	
Pakistan	Capital Smart City	Islamabad		Planned			A planned housing development and smart city near New Islamabad International Airport.	
Pakistan	Crescent Bay	Karachi	2006	In progress	2050 (proj.)	$2.4 billion USD	An upscale, mixed-use oceanfront development in Karachi.	
Pakistan	DHA City (DCK)	Karachi		Planned			Upon completion, the new city anticipates at least 250,000 residents and a daily flow of 50,000 commuters.	
Pakistan	Gwadar Port	Gwadar				$62 billion		
Pakistan	Islamabad	Islamabad Capital Territory	1960s	Completed		₨24 billion	Replaced Karachi as Pakistan's capital city. Islamabad has a population of 2.2 million.	
Pakistan	LDA City	Lahore		In progress			The city is to be built on a 3,059 hectares (7,560 acres) piece of virgin land and is the largest housing development in Punjab.	
Pakistan	Port Tower Complex	Karachi		Planned		$350 million USD	The 593 m (1,946 ft) tall skyscraper will be situation on a manmade island and, upon completion, will be the tallest building in South Asia.	
Pakistan	Ravi Riverfront Urban Development Project	Lahore	2020	In progress		$41.04 billion USD	70,000-acre urban development along both sides of the Ravi River.	
China	Todtown	Shanghai	2014	Completed	2022	$1.5 billion USD	A mixed-use development.	
Philippines	Bonifacio Global City	Metro Manila		Completed			Previously occupied by the Philippine Army headquarters, it is currently one of Metro Manila's main central business districts.	
Philippines	Eastwood City	Quezon City		Completed			A high-density mixed-use development.	
Philippines	Entertainment City	Manila Bay		In progress		$15 billion USD	An entertainment complex intended to be the Philippine counterpart of Macau and Las Vegas. It is built upon reclaimed land along Manila Bay.	
Philippines	Lancaster New City Zone 1 and Zone 2	Cavite		In progress			2,000 hectares (4,900 acres) planned community.	
Philippines	New Clark City	Tarlac, Pampanga		In progress		₱3.2 billion	A 9,450 hectares (23,400 acres) planned city modeled after South Korea's Songdo City.	
Philippines	Nuvali	Laguna		In progress			2,290 hectares (5,700 acres) planned community.	
Palestine	Rawabi	Ramallah–Jerusalem		Completed			$1.4 billion	
Palestine	Lana	Jerusalem		In progress				
Qatar	Lusail	Al Daayen Municipality		Completed		$45 billion USD	Host city of the 2022 FIFA World Cup. As of 2022, it has a population of 198,600 people.	
Saudi Arabia	Jeddah Economic City	Jeddah	2013	In progress	2030 (proj.)	SAR75 billion	The centerpiece of the development project will be the SAR4.45 billion Jeddah Tower, a tower planned to become the tallest in the world.	
Saudi Arabia	Jeddah Tower	Jeddah	2013	In progress	2028 (proj.)	SAR100 billion	The Jeddah Tower is planned to be the first 1-kilometre-tall (3,281 ft) building and would be the world's tallest building or structure upon completion, standing at least 180 m (591 ft) taller than the Burj Khalifa.	
Saudi Arabia	King Abdullah Economic City	Mecca Province		In progress		$100 billion USD	Phase 1 was completed in 2010.	
Saudi Arabia	King Abdullah Financial District	Riyadh		In progress		$78 billion USD	One of five phases has been completed.	
Saudi Arabia	Masjid al-Haram	Mecca		Completed	2020	$100 billion		
Saudi Arabia	Neom	Tabuk Province	2017	In progress	2039 (proj.)	$500 billion USD	A planned urban area containing The Line and Neom Bay Airport.	
South Korea	Sejong City	Sejong City	2014	In progress	2030 (proj.)		Set to replace Seoul as the capital city of the country.	
Sri Lanka	Colombo Port City	Colombo	2014	In progress	2041 (proj.)	$15 billion USD	A reclaimed offshore city that serves as a special economic zone and international financial centre.	
Thailand	One Bangkok	Bangkok	2018	In progress	2030	$3.9 billion		
Thailand	Iconsiam	Bangkok	2014	Completed	2018	$1.5 billion		
Thailand	Dusit Central Park	Bangkok	2019	In progress	2026	$1.5 billion		
United Arab Emirates	Burj Al Arab	Dubai	1994	Completed	1999	AED3.7 billion	The third tallest hotel in the world.	
United Arab Emirates	Burj Khalifa	Dubai	2004	Completed	2009	AED5.51 billion	The tallest building in the world since its grand opening in January 2010.	
United Arab Emirates	Business Bay	Dubai		In progress		AED110.18 billion	Once completed, it will be the region's business capital and will be composed primarily of office and residential towers.	
United Arab Emirates	Dubai Creek Tower	Dubai	2016	In progress		AED3.67 billion	When completed, it will surpass the height of the Burj Khalifa, the world's tallest building since 2010.	
United Arab Emirates	Dubai International City	Dubai	2004	In progress		AED348.65 billion	The city is expected to house 60,000 residents when completed.	
United Arab Emirates	Dubai Marina	Dubai		In progress			A district of Dubai and the world's largest manmade marina. The area is operational and continues to undergo development.	
United Arab Emirates	Dubai Meydan City	Dubai		In progress		AED8.08 billion		
United Arab Emirates	Dubai Waterfront	Dubai	-	Cancelled	-		After persistent erosion issues and the 2008 financial crisis, the project was cancelled.	
United Arab Emirates	Dubailand	Dubai	2003	In progress	2025 (proj.)	AED245.99 billion	Originally intended to be the largest leisure development in the world, Dubailand faced financial trouble during the 2008 financial crisis. Plans have been scaled down since.	
United Arab Emirates	Falconcity of Wonders	Dubai	2005	In progress		$36.5 billion USD		
United Arab Emirates	Jumeirah Garden City	Dubai		Stalled		AED348.65 billion		
United Arab Emirates	Mall of the World	Dubai		Planned	2029 (proj.)	$6.8 billion USD	Upon completion, this will be the world's largest shopping mall.	
United Arab Emirates	Masdar City	Abu Dhabi	2006	In progress		AED80.8 billion	The city will rely entirely on solar energy and other renewable energy sources, with a sustainable, zero-carbon, zero-waste ecology and will be a car free city.	
United Arab Emirates	Palm Deira	Dubai	2005				One of the Palm Islands.	
United Arab Emirates	Palm Jebel Ali	Dubai	2001	Stalled		$4 billion USD	One of the Palm Islands.	
United Arab Emirates	Palm Jumeirah	Dubai	2001	Completed		$12.3 billion USD	A large manmade island in the shape of a palm tree.	
United Arab Emirates	The Universe	Dubai		Indefinite hold			A planned artificial archipelago in the shape of the Milky Way and Solar System.	
United Arab Emirates	The World	Dubai	2003	In progress		$14 billion USD	An artificial archipelago of various small islands constructed in the rough shape of a world map	
United Arab Emirates	Yas Island	Abu Dhabi		In progress		$36 billion USD	A leisure island that is home to Yas Marina Circuit, which has hosted the Formula One Abu Dhabi Grand Prix since 2009.	

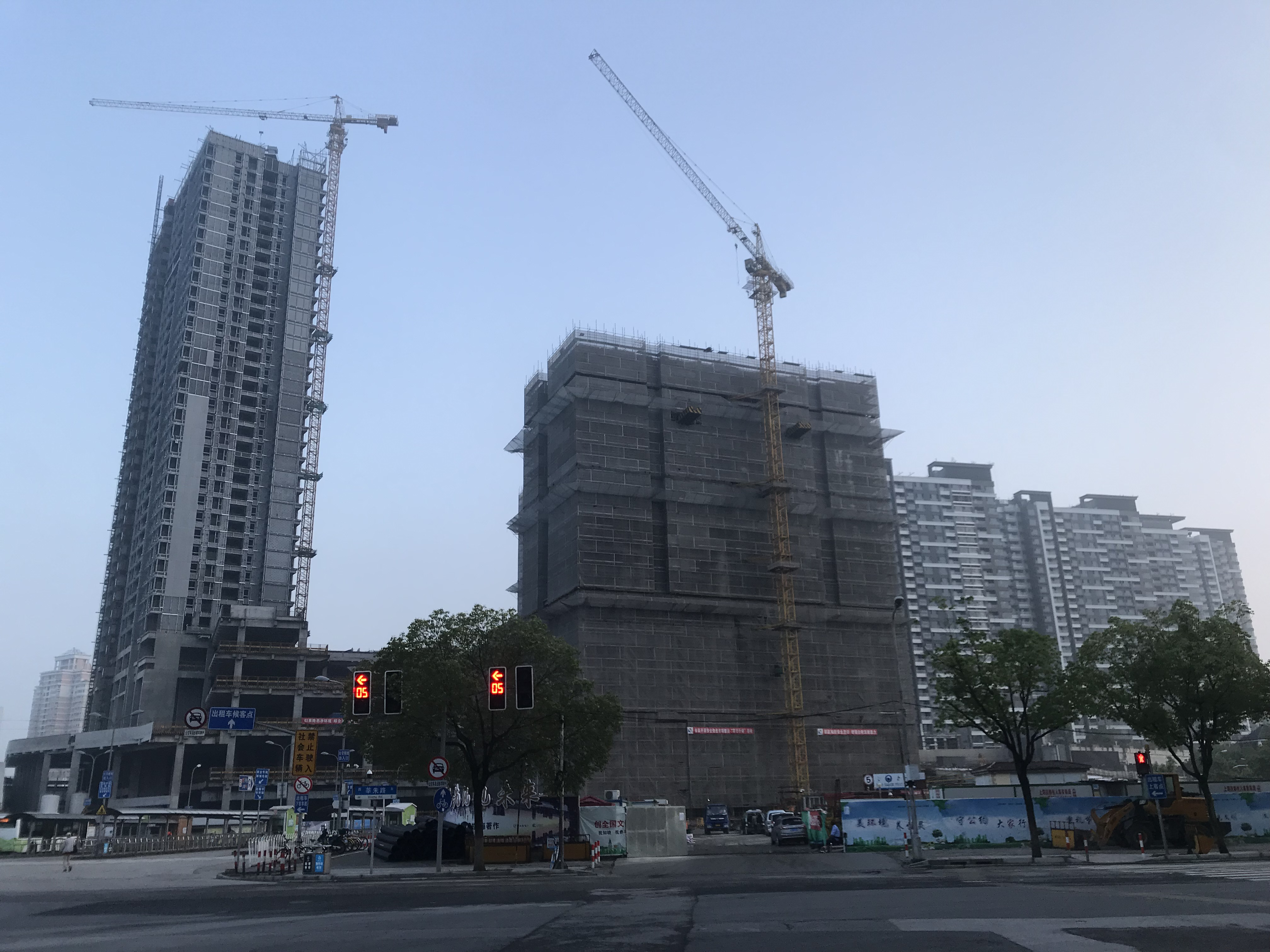
TODTOWN in Shanghai, July 2019.

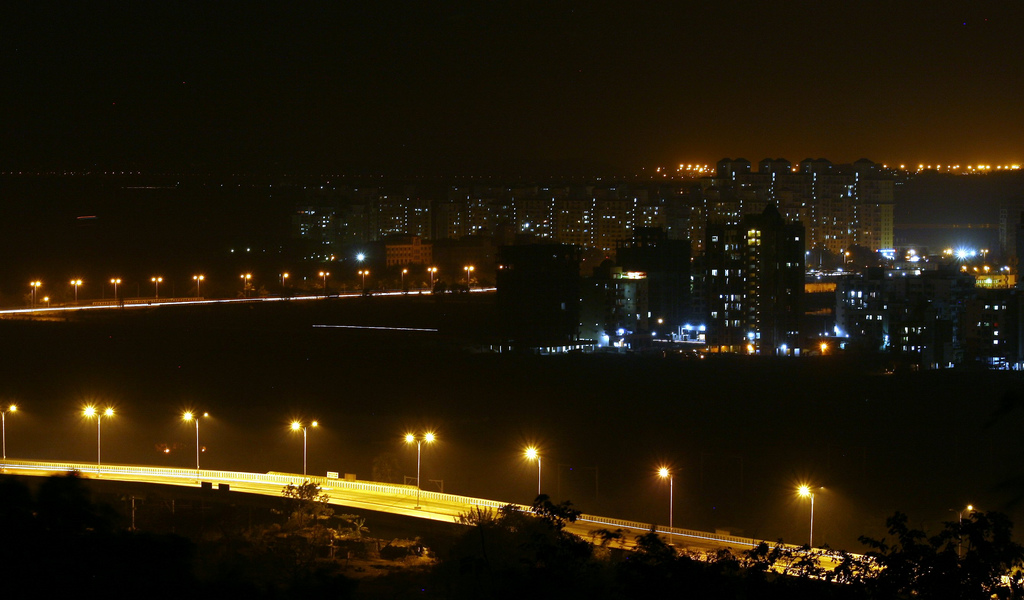
Navi Mumbai

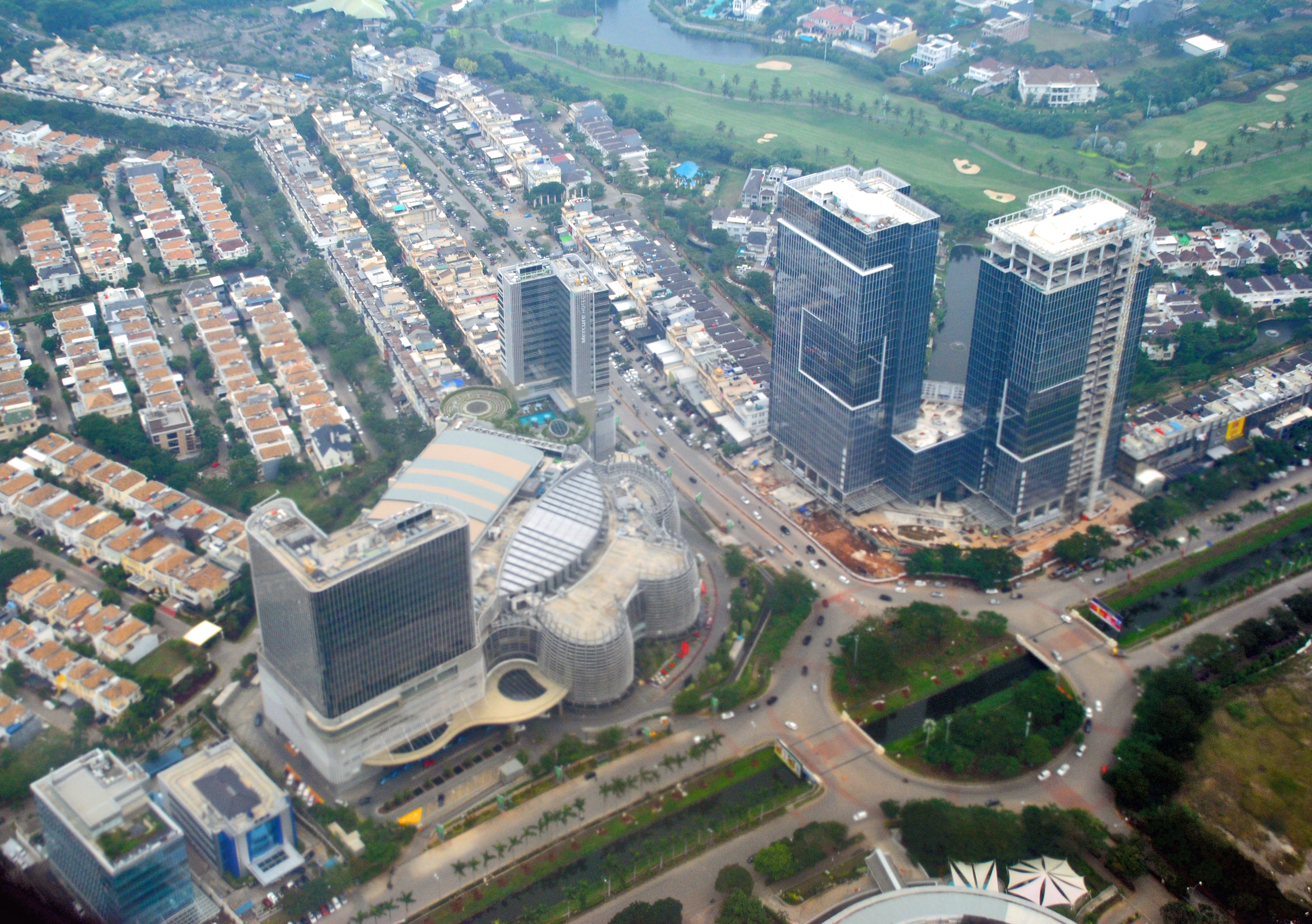
Aerial shot of Pantai Indah Kapuk.

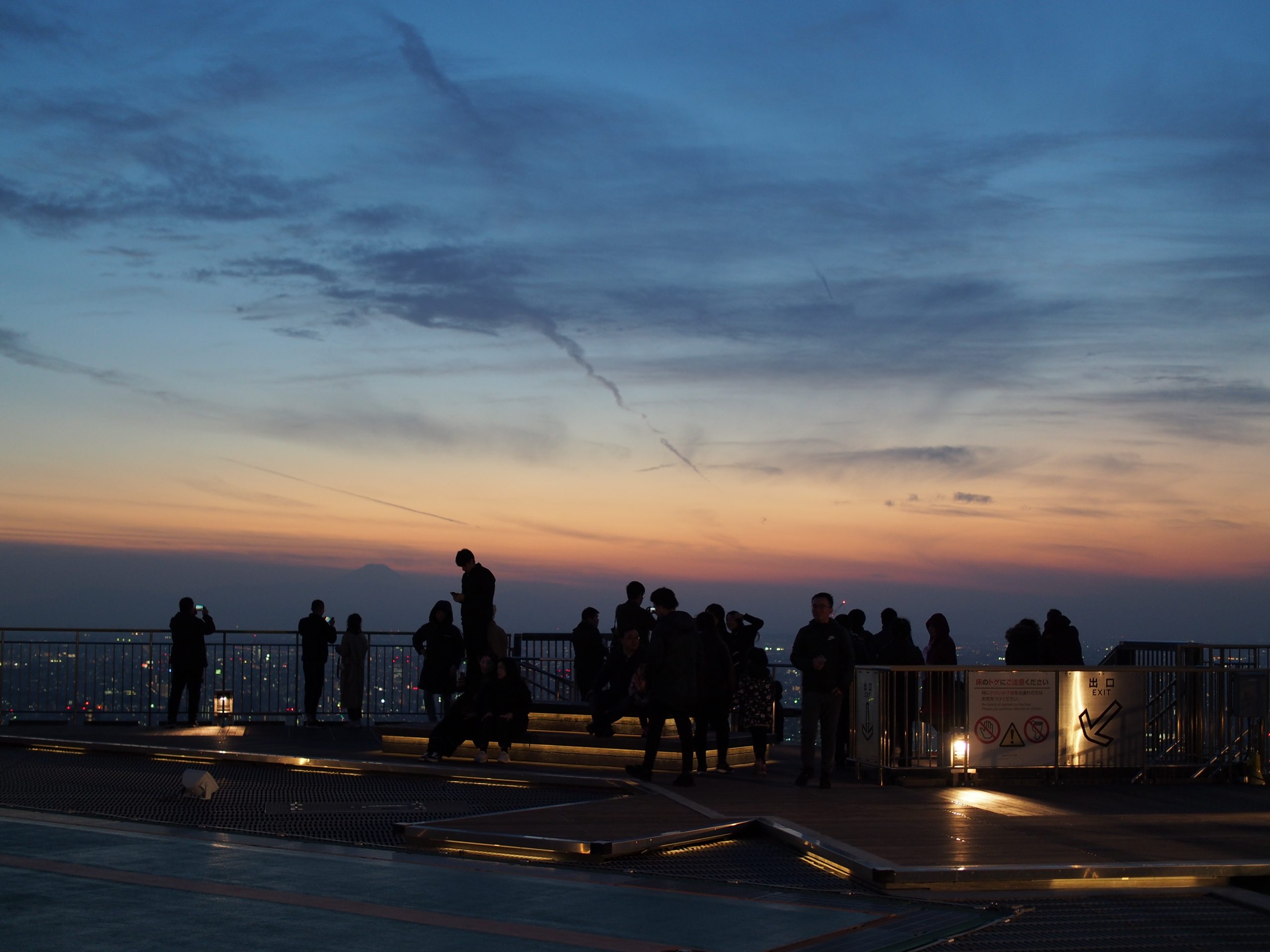
Dusk in Roppongi Hills, as seen from Mori Tower.

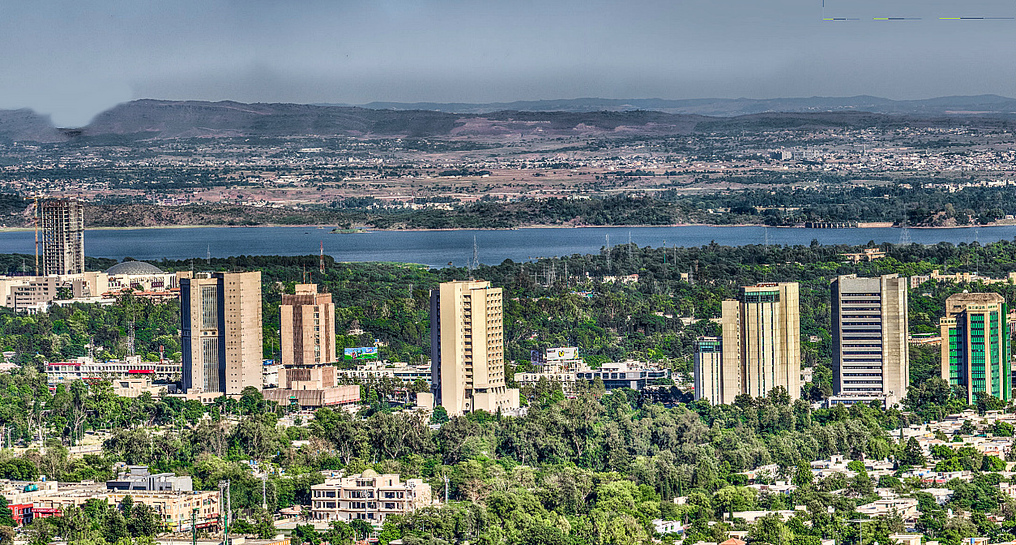
The skyline of Islamabad, the capital of Pakistan.

=== Europe ===
Country	Project	Location	Start year	Status	End year	Cost	Notes	Ref
France	Europa City	Gonesse	2016	Cancelled	2019	€3.07 billion	Construction began in 2016 but was cancelled in 2019 due to local opposition and concerns about the project's environmental impact.	
France	La Défense (1958–2014)	Paris metropolitan area	1958	Completed	2014	More than Fr41.972 billion	La Défense is Europe's largest purpose-built business district.	
France	La Défense (2016–present)	Paris metropolitan area	2016	In progress		More than €903 million	This project includes modernization and refurbishment of the existing area, as well as the addition of green spaces.	
Germany	Potsdamer Platz Redevelopment	Berlin		Completed				
Germany	HafenCity	Hamburg	2003	In progress	2030 (proj.)		One of the largest urban redevelopment projects in Europe by landmass.	
Germany	Germania (city)	Berlin	1938	Halted			A complete rebuild of Berlin to the World capital of Nazi, a megalomanic architectural project of Adolf Hitler and Albert Speer.	
Norway	Fjordbyen	Oslo	1980s	In progress			An urban redevelopment project.	
Norway	Oslo Airport City	Oslo		In progress				
Romania	Esplanada City Center	Bucharest	-	Cancelled	-	$4.2 billion USD	A planned multifunctional city center in Bucharest.	
Russia	Lakhta Centre	Lakhta, Saint Petersburg	2012	Completed	2019	₽77.1 billion	It is the tallest building in both Russia and Europe and replaced the cancelled Okhta Center.	
Russia	Moscow International Business Center	Moscow	1995	In progress	2030 (proj.)	More than ₽309 billion	The complex is home to the highest numbers of skyscrapers in Europe.	
Russia	Okhta Center	Saint Petersburg		Cancelled	-	₽65 billion	Cancelled due to protests from the UNESCO World Heritage Centre, who wanted to preserve the skyline of Saint Petersburg's historic district.	
Spain	Bilbao Renovation Project	Bilbao	1990s	Completed			A deindustrialisation process beginning in the 1990s with the construction of the Guggenheim Museum Bilbao	
Spain	Cuatro Torres Business Area	Madrid	2004	Completed	2021	$1 billion USD (est.)	A complex of four skyscrapers, including Torre Cepsa, in Madrid's financial district.	
Spain	Madrid Nuevo Norte	Madrid	2021 (proj.)	In progress	2045 (proj.)	$10.55 billion USD	Expansion of the existing Paseo de la Castellana.	
Spain	Southeast developments	Madrid		In progress	2040-2050 (proj.)	More than $3.5 billion USD	Expansion of the city with the creation of six new neighborhoods: Los cerros, Ensanche de Vallecas, Valdecarros, El Cañaveral, Los Berrocales, and El Ahijones. These additions expect to create 145,637 homes.	
Sweden	Million Programme	Nationwide	1965	Completed	1974	$5 billion USD (approx.	A public housing program meant to establish affordable housing.	
Sweden	Northvolt Gigafactories	Skellefteå, Västerås	2021	Completed	2025	$4.7 billion USD	Lithium ion battery factory development.	
Sweden	Redevelopment of Slussenområdet	Stockholm		In progress		Kr12 billion		
Sweden	Relocation of Kiruna Centrum	Kiruna		In progress	2035 (proj.)	$2.1 billion USD		
Turkey	Istanbul Financial Center	Istanbul	2009	Completed	2023	7.58₺ billion		
Turkey	Turkey Urban Renewal Project	Nationwide	2012	In progress	2032 (proj.)	757.84₺ billion	Fikirtepe, a neighborhood of Kadıköy has been chosen as pilot area for project.	
United Kingdom	Big City Plan	Birmingham	1994	In progress	2030s (proj.)	£12.75 billion	Redevelopment of Birmingham to escape their image of being a concrete jungle.	
United Kingdom	Battersea Power Station Redevelopment	London	2012	Completed	2022	£13.25 billion	Modernisation of a defunct coal power station into a shopping centre.	
United Kingdom	Embassy Gardens	London		Completed	2019	£2.1 billion	Residential and business development district.	
United Kingdom	Greenwich Peninsula	London	1990s	In progress	2030s (proj.)	£8 billion		
United Kingdom	Pilgrim Street East	Newcastle upon Tyne		In progress	2025 (proj.)	More than £400 million		
United Kingdom	Royal Wharf	London	2014	In progress	2020–2023	£3.1 billion	Originally slated for completion in 2020, the development was nearly finished in 2021. This was mostly completed by 2020, with final phases completed around late 2023.	
United Kingdom	Stratford City	London		In progress		£3.5 billion	Originally slated for completion by 2020.	
United Kingdom	Wembley Park	London		In progress	2024 (proj.)	£1.1 billion		

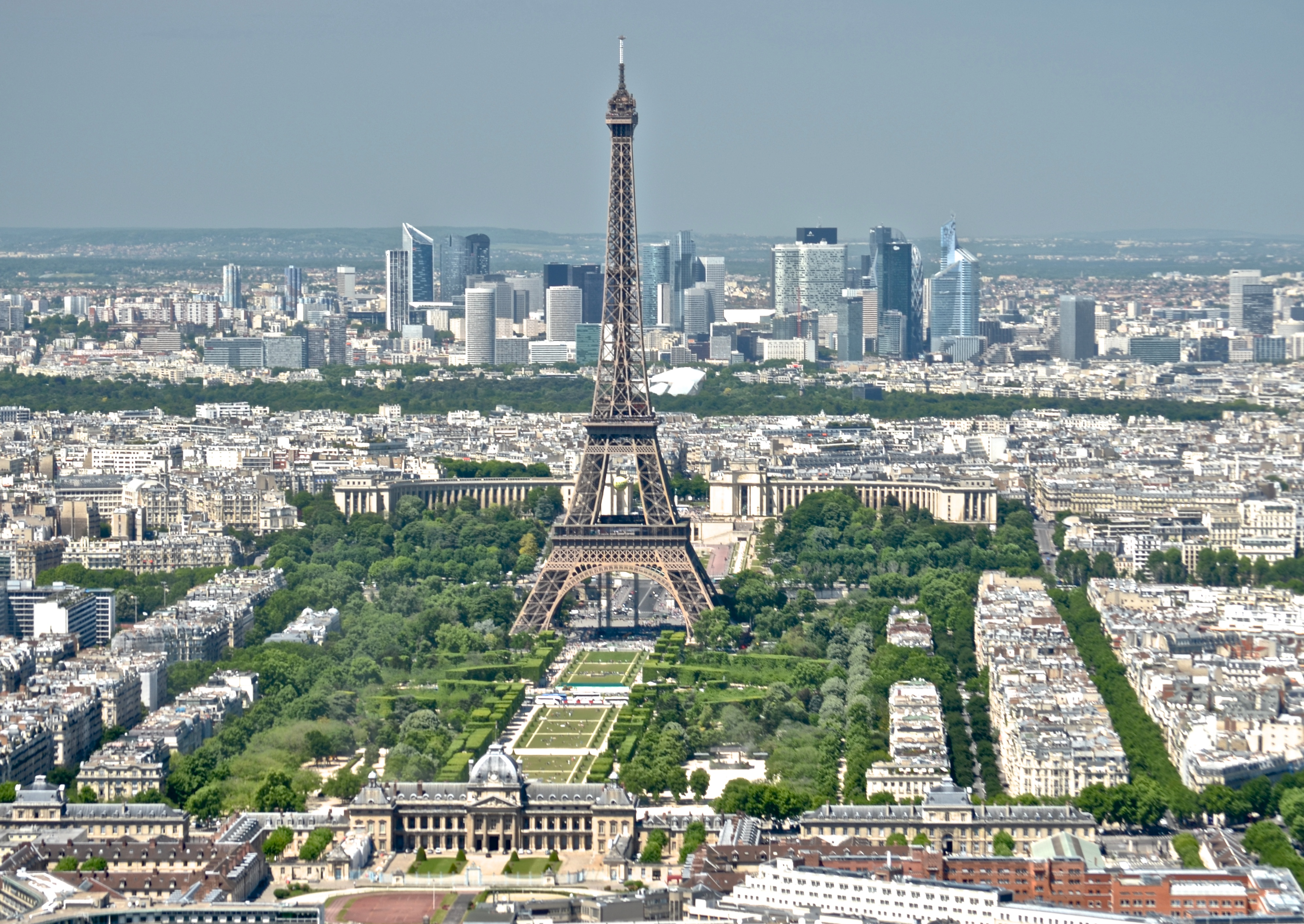
La Défense skyscrapers in the distance behind the Eiffel Tower

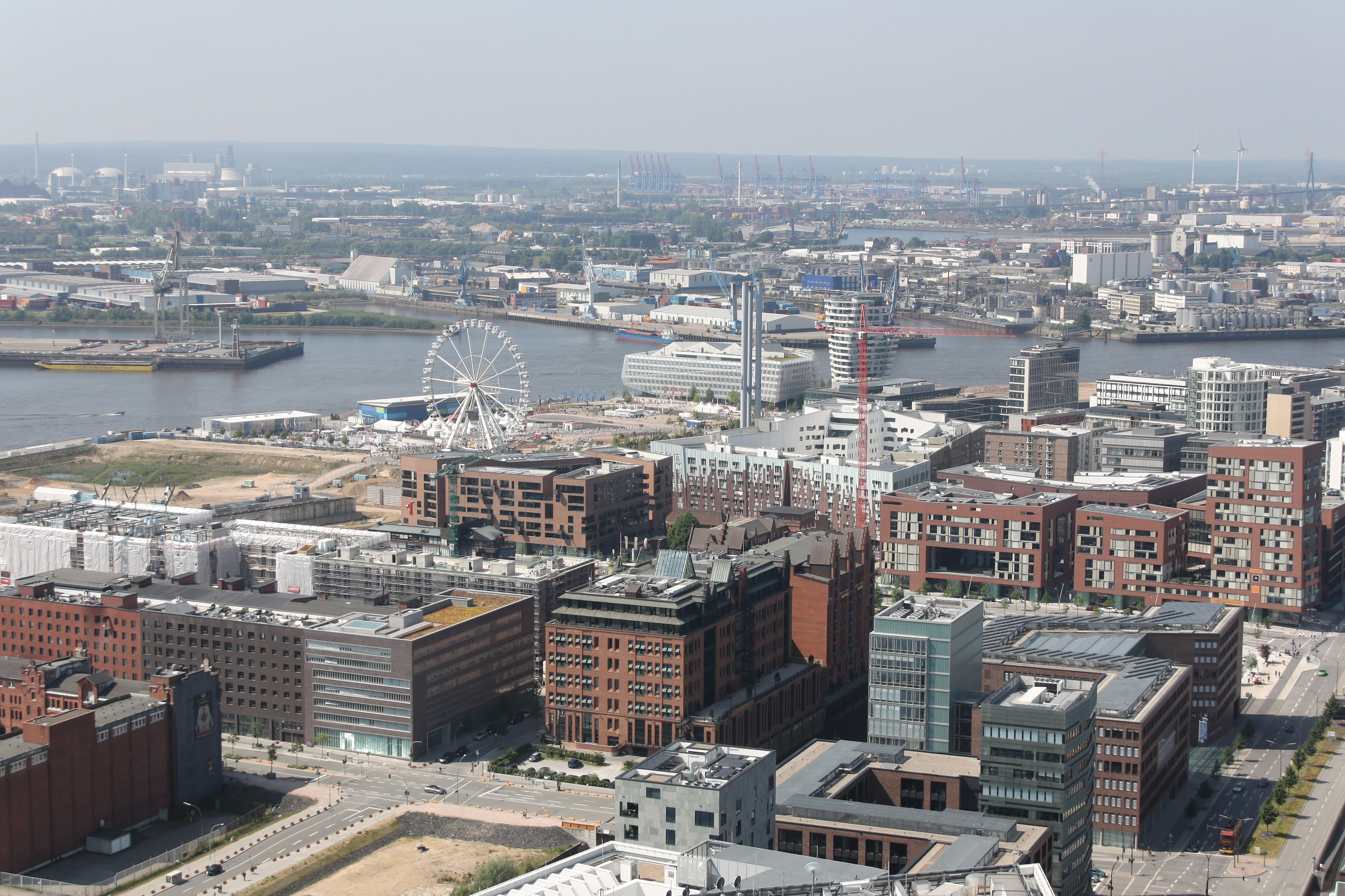
Überseequartier, one of the quarters in HafenCity

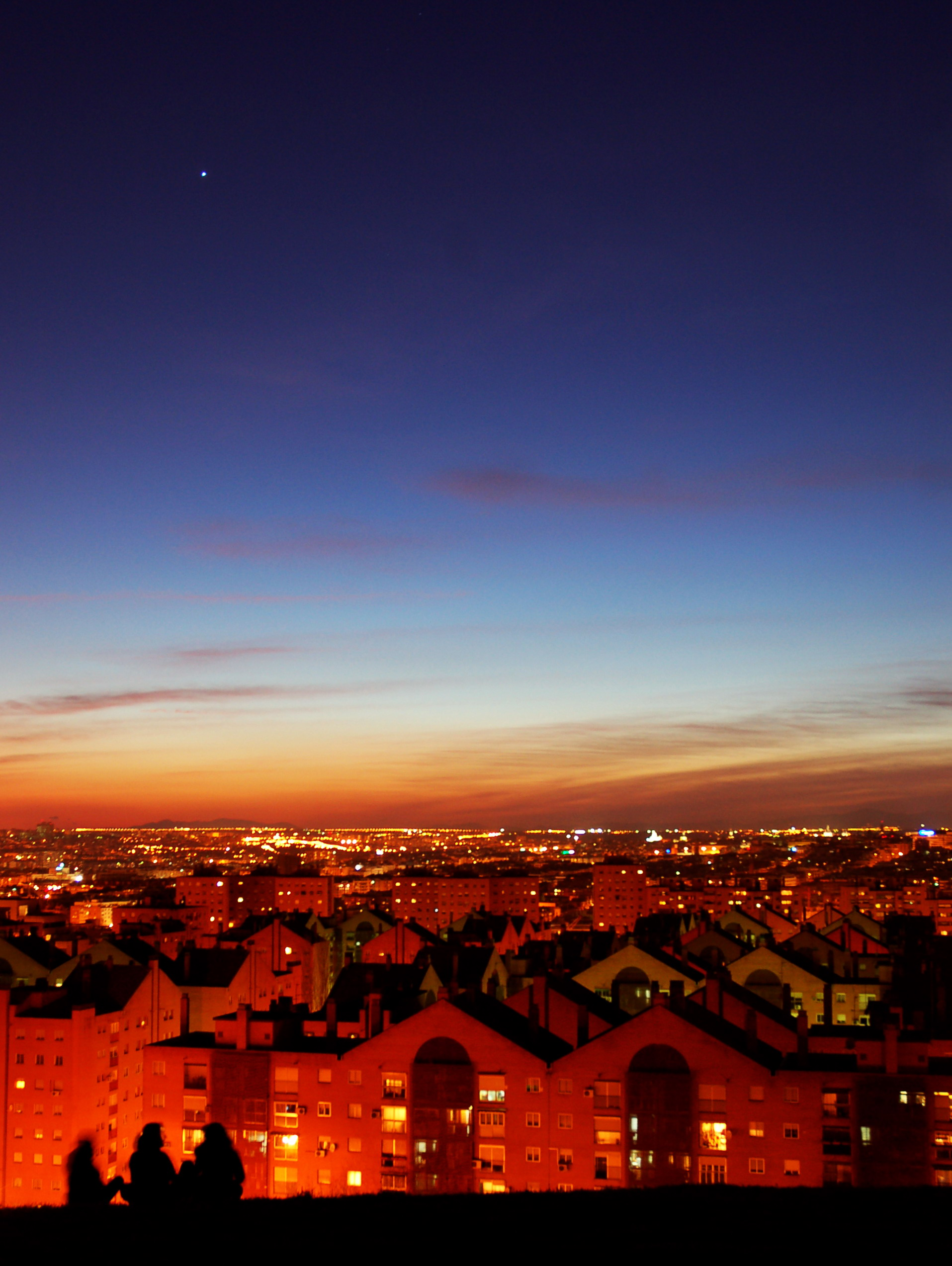
Ensanche de Vallecas in Madrid at sunset

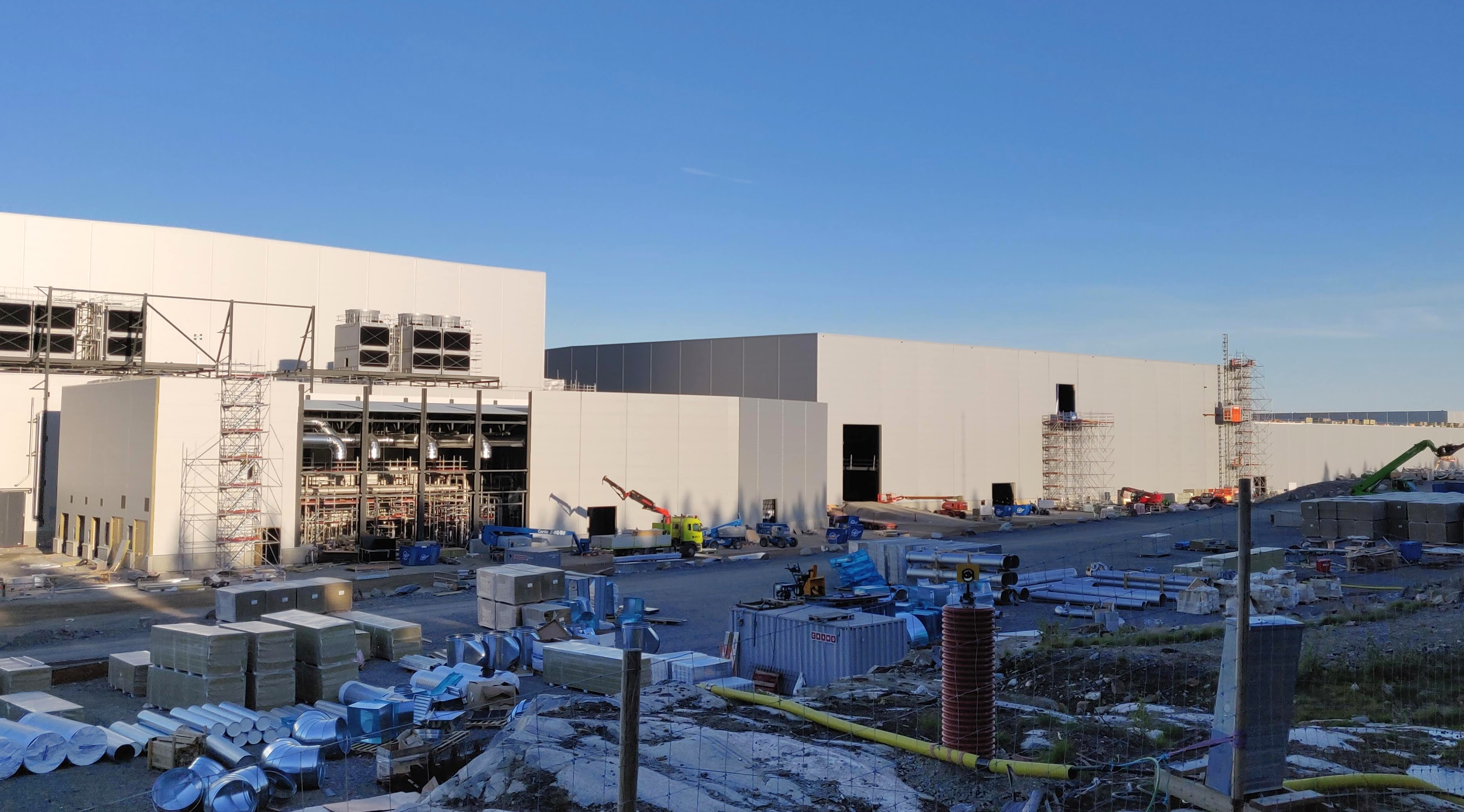
Construction of the Northvolt gigafactory in Skellefteå (2021)

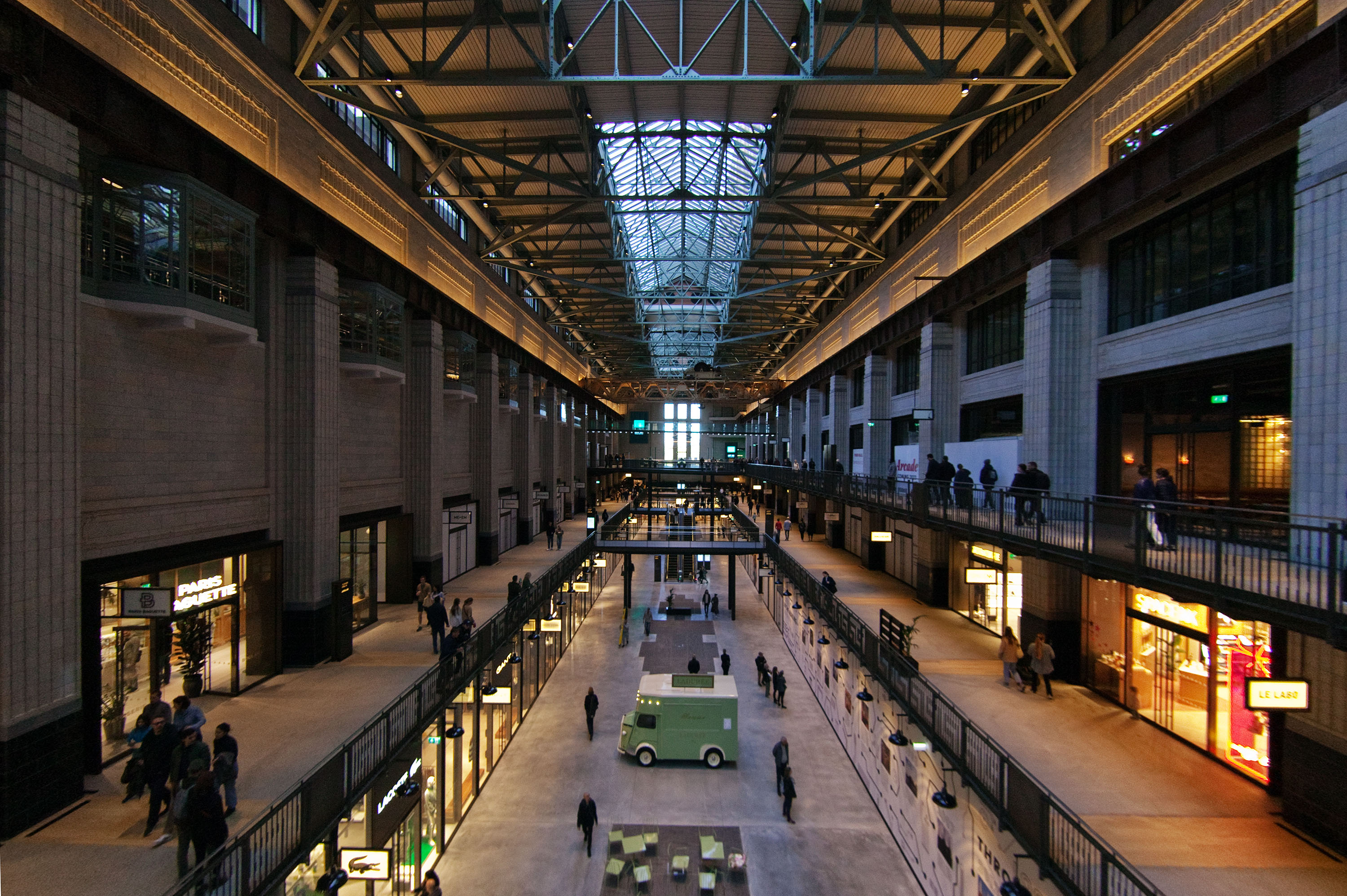
London's Battersea Power Station was reopened as a shopping mall in 2022.

=== North America ===
Country	Project	Location	Start year	Status	End year	Cost	Notes	Ref
Canada	Downtown Markham	Ontario		In progress	2025 (proj.)	CA$4 billion	One of the many city center projects in York Region.	
Canada	Oakridge Centre Redevelopment	Vancouver	2019	In progress	2028 (proj.)	CA$5 billion	This project will turn Oakridge Centre into the second largest shopping mall in British Columbia.	
Mexico	Cancún	Quintana Roo		Completed			One of the largest tourist destinations in North America.	
Mexico	Santa Fe, Mexico City	Mexico City		Completed				
United States	53 West 53	Manhattan	2015	Completed	2019	$1.2 billion	A supertall, primarily residential skyscraper. A restaurant and MoMA also lease space in the building.	
United States	Apple Park	Cupertino, California	2014	Completed	2017	More than $3 billion	Apple Inc.'s flagship headquarters.	
United States	Battery Park City	Manhattan	1970s	Completed		More than $1.4 billion	A mainly residential 92-acre (37 ha) planned community at the southwestern tip of the island of Manhattan, more than 1/3 of which is parkland.	
United States	Hunters Point Naval Shipyard and Candlestick Park Redevelopment	Bayview–Hunters Point, San Francisco		In progress	After 2028 (proj.)	$8 billion		
United States	Blue Oval City	Stanton, Tennessee		Planned		$5.6 billion	Large-scale Ford electric vehicle complex that will include a vehicle assembly plant, a battery plant, supplier facilities, and battery recycling operations.	
United States	BlueOval SK Battery Park	Glendale, Kentucky		In progress	2025 (proj.)	$5.8 billion	Large-scale battery plant that includes two plants that will produce batteries for Ford and Lincoln electric vehicles.	
United States	Brickell City Centre	Brickell district, Downtown Miami	2012	In progress		$1.05 billion	A shopping and mixed-use project that will eventually include One Brickell Centre.	
United States	Brickell Key	Miami		Completed		More than $2 billion	A manmade island on reclaimed land.	
United States	CityCenter	Las Vegas Strip	2006	Completed	2009	$11 billion	The largest privately financed development in the United States.	
United States	Comcast Technology Center	Philadelphia	2014	Completed	2017	$1.5 billion	Ninth-tallest building in the Western Hemisphere.	
United States	Cornell Tech campus	Roosevelt Island, Manhattan	2014	In progress	2037 (proj.)	$2 billion	A graduate campus and research center for Cornell University. The first phase opened for use in 2017.	
United States	Encore Boston Harbor	Everett, Massachusetts	2016	Completed	2019	$2.5 billion	A casino resort property that is the largest single private development in state history.	
United States	Generation Park	Houston	2014	In progress		More than $10 billion	A 4,200-acre, privately owned and master-planned commercial development.	
United States	Gigafactory 1	Reno	2014	Completed	2017	$5 billion	A lithium-ion battery plant owned and operated by Tesla, Inc.	
United States	Hollywoodland	Middletown, Ohio	-	Canceled	-	$1.3 billion	A massive mixed-use development expected to include a destination entertainment district and theme park. The project was cancelled in 2022.	
United States	Hudson Yards Redevelopment Project	West Side Yard, Manhattan	2012	In progress	2027 (proj.)	$20 billion	A mixed-use real estate development.	
United States	Lincoln Yards Project	Chicago		Stalled		$6 billion	Development of 55 acres of a defunct steel mill park.	
United States	Miami Worldcenter	Miami		In progress		$4 billion	A large mixed-use development over 25 acres of land. Two buildings, including the Paramount Miami Worldcenter, opened in 2019.	
United States	Mission Bay Redevelopment	San Francisco		In progress		$1 billion		
United States	Pacific Park	Brooklyn		In progress	2025 (proj.)	$8 billion	A mixed-use commercial and residential development project that includes Barclays Center, which opened in 2012.	
United States	Parkmerced	San Francisco		In progress	2035 (proj.)	$1.35 billion		
United States	Shell Pennsylvania Petrochemicals Complex	Potter Township	2017			$6 billion	An ethylene cracker plant owned by Shell Oil Company. Operations began in 2022.	
United States	Port Covington	Baltimore	2019	In progress	2040 (proj.)	$5.5 billion		
United States	Riverside South	Manhattan	1997	Completed	2020	$3 billion	An urban development project.	
United States	San Francisco Transbay development	San Francisco	2005	In progress	2030 (proj.)	$4.5 billion	This project will include a new Salesforce Transit Center. The Salesforce Tower opened in 2018.	
United States	Sasol Ethane Cracker Complex Project	Louisiana		In progress		$11 billion	A large-scale ethane cracker complex.	
United States	San Diego State University Mission Valley	Mission Valley		In progress	2030s (proj.)	$3.5 billion	An expansion of the SDSU's campus on the former site of San Diego Stadium. Snapdragon Stadium opened in 2022.	
United States	Treasure Island Redevelopment	San Francisco	2016	In progress	2028 (proj.)	$6 billion		
United States	Tri-County Mall Redevelopment	Springdale, Ohio		Proposed		$1.3 billion	Redevelopment of a shopping mall into a multi-use space.	
United States	Vista Tower Project	Chicago	2016	Completed	2020	$1 billion	It is the tallest structure designed by a woman in the world.	
United States	Washington State Convention Center Expansion	Seattle	2018	Completed	2023	$1.6 billion		
United States	Wilshire Grand Center	Los Angeles	2014	Completed	2017	$1.2 billion	At 1,100 ft (340 m), it is the tallest building west of the Mississippi River.	
United States	Rebuilding of the World Trade Center	Manhattan	2006	On hold		$32 billion	This was part of the recovery from the September 11 attacks. One, Three, Four, and Seven World Trade Center Towers have been completed as of 2018.	

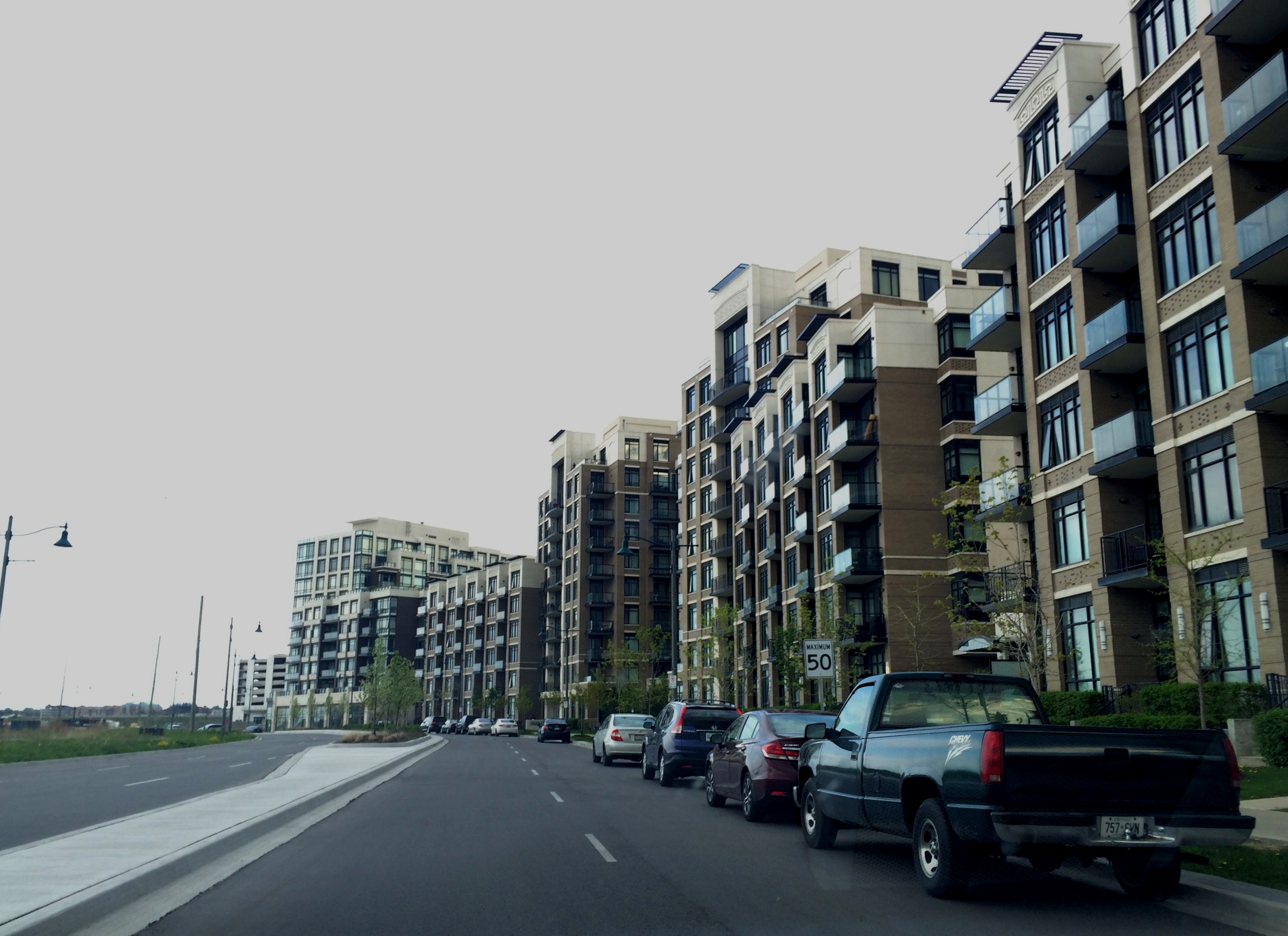
Verclaire Gate South in Downtown Markham, Ontario.

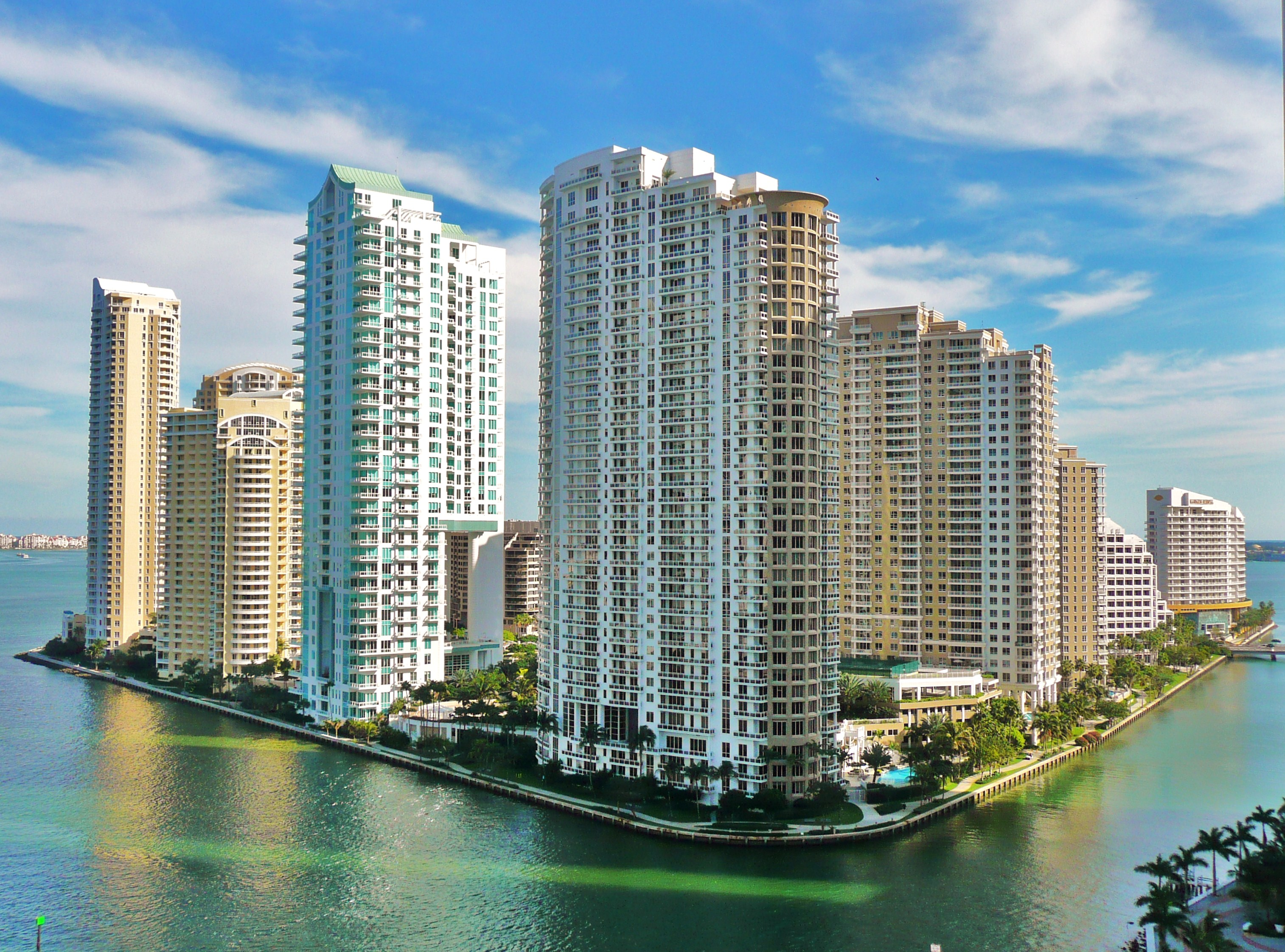
Brickell Key in Miami.

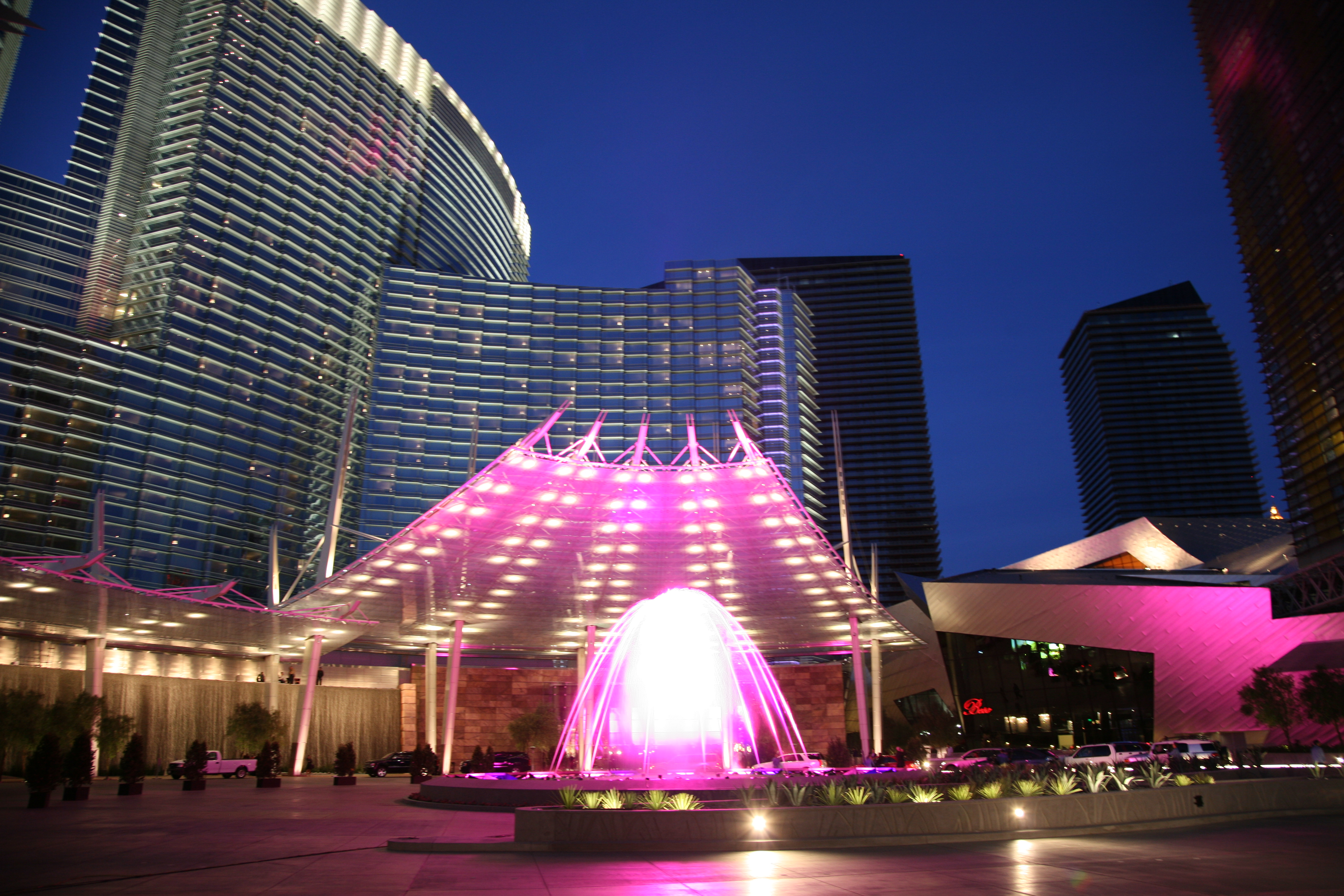
Las Vegas CityCenter, the largest set of resorts in the largest gambling center in the world.

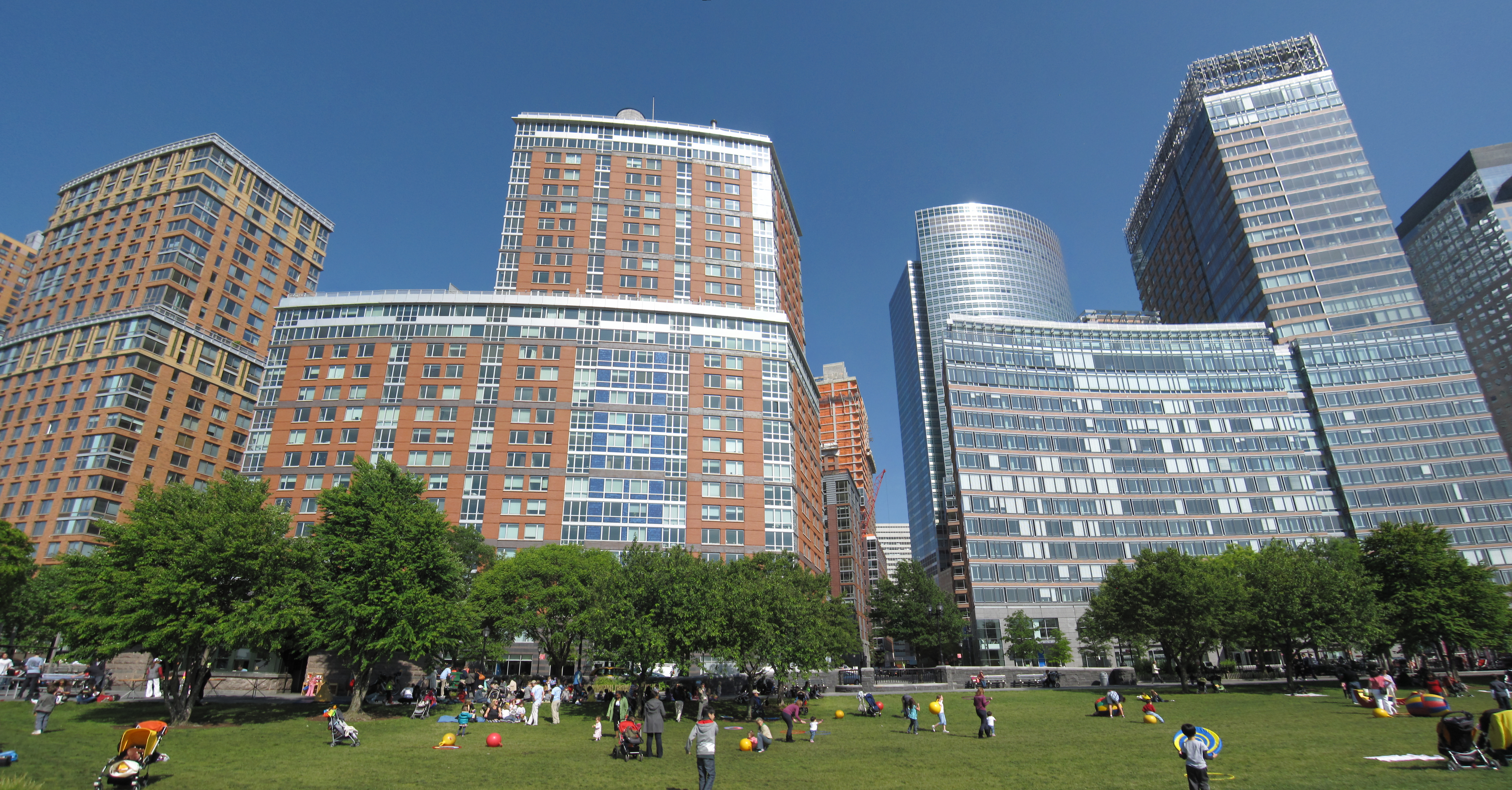
Panoramic shot of Battery Park City.

=== Oceania ===
Country	Project	Location	Start year	Status	End year	Cost	Notes	Ref
Australia	Barangaroo Redevelopment	Sydney	2012	Completed	2023 (proj.)	$6 billion		
Australia	Queen's Wharf, Brisbane	Brisbane	2018	Completed	2024 (proj.)	A$3.6 billion	Integrated resort development on the north bank of the Brisbane River.	
Australia	Waterfront Brisbane	Brisbane	2022	Under Construction	TBA	A$2.5 billion	The North Tower is expected to be completed in 2028, with the South Tower being completed on an unspecified later date	
Australia	Victorian Desalination Plant	Bass Coast Shire	2009	Completed	2012	$4 billion	Built to provide more drinking water to Melbourne.	
New Zealand	Christchurch Rebuild	Christchurch	2011	In progress	2027 (proj.)	$17 billion	Recovery from earthquakes in 2010–2011.	

=== South America ===
Country	Project	Location	Start year	Status	End year	Cost	Notes	Ref
Brazil	Brasília	Brasília	1956	Completed	1960	$21.9 billion	At the close of the 20th century, Brasília was the largest city in the world that had not existed at the beginning of the century.	
Colombia	Bogotá Urban Renewal	Bogotá		In progress		$50 billion USD	Includes building over 60 skyscrapers, 500 highrises, 3 new CBDs, a subway system, and a smart city near Usaquén	

== Water-related ==
Ports, waterways, canals, and locks for ships carrying passengers and cargo are built as megaprojects.

=== Africa ===
Country	Project	Location	Start year	Status	End year	Cost	Notes	Ref
Egypt	New Suez Canal	Ismailia and Suez Governates	2014	Completed	2015	$8.4 billion USD	Old and New Suez Canal	
Egypt	Suez Canal	Ismailia and Suez Governates	1859	Completed	1869	$100 million (1869)	Old and New Suez Canal	
Ethiopia	Gilgel Gibe III Dam	South Ethiopia Regional State	2006	Completed	2016	$1.6 billion USD		
Ethiopia	Grand Ethiopian Renaissance Dam	Benishangul-Gumuz Region	2011	Completed	2022	$5 billion USD	The dam is located on the Blue Nile River.	
Ethiopia	Koysha Dam	South West Ethiopia Peoples' Region	2016	In progress	2027	$3 billion USD	Koysha will be the second largest dam in Ethiopia upon completion	
Kenya	Lamu Port and Lamu-Southern Sudan-Ethiopia Transport Corridor	Lamu		Stalled		KSh $2 trillion		
Nigeria	Badagry Deep Sea Port	Badagry		Approved		$2.3 billion USD	The project, which has been stalled for years, was most recently approved in October 2022.	
Nigeria	Lekki Port	Lekki	2015	Completed	2022	$1.65 billion USD	Phase one became operational in 2018.	
Tanzania	Bagamoyo Port	Bagamoyo	2023 (proj.)	Stalled		$10 billion USD		

=== Asia ===
Country	Project	Location	Start year	Status	End year	Cost	Notes	Ref
China	Medog Hydropower Station	Mêdog County, Tibet	2024	In progress	2033 (proj.)	$137 billion USD	Planned to become the world's largest hydropower facility, with an anticipated annual power generation capacity of 300 billion kilowatt-hours and 60,000 MW installed capacity.	
China	South–North Water Transfer Project	North and south China	2003	In progress		$79 billion USD		
China	Three Gorges Dam	Yiling District	1994	Completed	2003	$59 billion USD		
China	Central Yunnan Water Diversion Project	Yunnan	2017	Completed	2026	$12 billion USD		
India	Sagar Mala project	Nationwide		In progress		₹8.5 trillion	This project includes creating six mega-ports, modernising existing ports, developing the 14 Coastal Economic Zones and Units, and enhancing port connectivity.	
Israel	National Water Carrier of Israel	Nationwide	1953	Completed	1964	$1.08 billion USD		
Japan	Kamaishi Tsunami Protection Breakwater	Kamaishi, Iwate	c. 1989	Completed	2009	$1.5 billion USD	After three decades of development, the tsunami barrier was proven ineffective against the 2011 Tōhoku earthquake and tsunami.	
Pakistan	Dasu Dam	Dasu	2019	In progress	2015 (proj.)	$4.278 billion USD	The 242 m (794 ft) tall dam will support a 4,320 MW hydropower station, to be built in two 2,160 MW stages.	
Pakistan	Diamer-Bhasha Dam	Indus River	2020	In progress	2028 (proj.)	$14 billion USD		
Pakistan	Mohmand Dam	Mohmand District	2019	In progress	2028 (proj.)	$2.1 billion USD	An under-construction, multi-purpose, concrete-faced, rock-filled dam, which will generate 740 MW of hydroelectricity, irrigate 15,100 acres of land and control floods downstream.	
Sri Lanka	Colombo Harbour Expansion Project	Colombo	2008	Completed	2013	$1.2 billion		
Thailand	Thai Canal	Southern Thailand		Proposed		$20–25 billion		

=== Europe ===
Country	Project	Location	Start year	Status	End year	Cost	Notes	Ref
Denmark	Energy islands of Denmark	North Sea, Baltic Sea		Approved	2030 (proj.)	kr210 billion	Two Energy Islands will become the world's first offshore energy hubs and are estimated to initially provide 5 gigawatts of power.	
Netherlands	Delta Works	Rhine–Meuse–Scheldt delta area	1954	Completed	1997	ƒ22,412 billion	A series of construction projects in the southwest of the Netherlands to protect a large area of land around the Rhine-Meuse-Scheldt delta from the sea. The project was proposed after the North Sea Flood of 1953.	
Netherlands	Zuiderzee Works	North Sea	1927	Completed	1933		A human-made system of dams and dikes, land reclamation and water drainage work, in total the largest hydraulic engineering project undertaken by the Netherlands during the 20th century.	
Norway	Stad Ship Tunnel	Vestland	2023	In progress	2026 (proj.)	kr3 billion	A planned canal and tunnel to bypass the dangerous coast of the Stad Peninsula. When built, it will be the first full-size ship tunnel in the world.	
Turkey	Istanbul Canal	Istanbul	2009	Proposed		$10 billion	It is an artificial sea-level waterway planned to connect the Black Sea to the Sea of Marmara	

=== North America ===
Country	Project	Location	Start year	Status	End year	Cost	Notes	Ref
Canada	Rideau Canal	Ontario	1826	Completed	1832	£822,804 (1834)	A 202 km (126 mi) waterway built to provide a secure supply and communications route between Montreal and the British naval base in Kingston.	
Cuba	New Port of Mariel Development Project	Mariel		Completed		$900 million		
Mexico	Dos Bocas Refinery	Tabasco		Planned				
Mexico	Port of Veracruz Expansion	Veracruz		In progress		$5 billion USD		
Nicaragua	Nicaragua Canal	Punta Brito-Bluefields	-	Abandoned	-	$100 billion USD (est.)	This shipping route was meant to connect the Caribbean Sea with the Pacific Ocean.	
Panama	Panama Canal	Colón and Panamá Provinces	1904	Completed	1914	$360 million USD		
Panama	Panama Canal	Colón and Panamá Provinces	2007	Completed	2016	B/.5.25 billion		
United States	Intracoastal Waterway	Boston-Brownsville, Texas		Completed			A 3,000-mile (4,800 km) inland waterway along the Atlantic and Gulf of Mexico coasts of the United States.	
United States	Proposed interstate water pipelines to California	Pacific Northwest–Calif.		Proposed		$110 billion	Several proposals including $110 billion in 1991 to pipe water under the Pacific from Alaska	

=== South America ===
Country	Project	Location	Start year	Status	End year	Cost	Notes	Ref
Brazil	Porto Maravilha	Rio de Janeiro	1870s	Completed	1910	R$69.965 billion	Third-busiest port in Brazil.	
Brazil/Paraguay	Itaipu Dam	Foz do Iguaçu	1971	Completed	1984	US$19.6 billion (equivalent to $59.3 billion today)	Itaipu was the world's largest hydroelectric power plant from its 1984 inauguration until it was surpassed by China's Three Gorges Dam in 2012.	
Brazil	Sobradinho Reservoir	Sobradinho	1973	Completed	1979		The largest artificial lake in Brazil.	
Brazil	Tucuruí Dam	Tocantins River	1975	Completed	1984	US$7.1 billion		
Brazil	Transfer of the São Francisco River	Northeast Region of Brazil	2007	Completed	2025	US$2.6 billion		
Brazil	Belo Monte Dam	Xingu River	2011	Completed	2019	US$18.5 billion		

== Hospitals ==
=== Europe ===
Country	Project	Location	Start year	Status	End year	Cost	Notes	Ref
Ireland	National Children's Hospital Ireland	Dublin	2016	Completed	2025	€2.2 billion		

=== North America ===
Country	Project	Location	Start year	Status	End year	Cost	Notes	Ref
United States	Kimmel Pavilion (NYU Langone)	New York City	2011	Completed	2018	Part of NYU Langone's $6 billion campus transformation	21-story, 830,000 sq ft inpatient hospital tower with 374 single rooms; includes Hassenfeld Children's Hospital	

== Government and Administration ==
=== Europe ===
Country	Project	Location	Start year	Status	End year	Cost	Notes	Ref
Romania	Palace of the Parliament	Bucharest	1984	Completed	1997	€4 billion		

Palace of the Parliament

== See also ==
- List of most expensive U.S. public works projects
- List of visionary tall buildings and structures
- List of megaprojects in India
- List of megaprojects in Russia
- List of megaprojects in China
- List of megaprojects in Bangladesh
- List of megaprojects in Pakistan
- List of megaprojects in Afghanistan
- List of megaprojects in Iran
- List of megaprojects in Saudi Arabia
- List of megaprojects in United Arab Emirates
- List of megaprojects in Oman
- List of megaprojects in Qatar
- List of megaprojects in Kuwait
- List of megaprojects in Turkey
- List of megaprojects in Egypt
