= Rail transport in Ethiopia =

Ethiopia

Operation
- Major operators: Ethiopian Railway Corporation

System length
- Total: 2,185 kilometres (1,358 mi) doublelength=
- Electrified: 1,401 kilometres (871 mi)

Track gauge
- 1,435 mm (4 ft 8 1/2 in) standard gauge: 1,401 kilometres (871 mi)
- 1,000 mm (3 ft 3 3/8 in) metre gauge: 784 kilometres (487 mi)

Rail transport in Ethiopia is done within the National Railway Network of Ethiopia, which currently consists of three electrified standard gauge railway lines: the Addis Ababa–Djibouti Railway, the Awash–Weldiya Railway and the Weldiya–Mekelle Railway. Other lines are still in the planning phase. There is also an urban light rail system in the country's capital, the Addis Ababa Light Rail.

All railways in Ethiopia are owned and operated by an Ethiopian state-owned enterprise, the Ethiopian Railway Corporation (ERC). A planned legislation opens rail transport to the private sector, from the construction of rail infrastructure to the operation of the same infrastructure and on to the operation of privately owned trains.

== History ==
=== 20th century ===
For more than a century, Ethiopia was served by an international metre gauge railway, from Addis Ababa to the Red Sea port of Djibouti City in Djibouti. The privately built railway primarily served economic purposes. That century-old railway, built from 1897 to 1917, the Ethio-Djibouti Railway and its decades-old rolling stock eventually lacked spare parts and was partially closed down over a number of years after the end of the 20th century. Addis Ababa lost its access to the Red Sea in 2004.

The original plans from the beginning of the 20th foresaw an extension of the railway from Addis Ababa to the Didessa River near Jimma to have full access to the main coffee-producing areas of Ethiopia, but that plan was scrapped already more than 10 years before the railway finally reached Addis Ababa in 1917. In the late 1930s, during the period when Ethiopia was under Italian rule, the Italian administration proposed the construction of several new railways: the Addis Ababa–Dessie–Massaua Railway, the Gondar–Dessie–Assab Railway and the Addis Ababa–Dollo–Mogadishu Railway. These railways would cement the Italian colonial rule in Ethiopia, and economically justified operation was not foreseen. The projects were abandoned due to the outbreak of World War II when Ethiopia regained its sovereignty.

In the 1960s, when only the already ageing metre gauge railway between the Port of Djibouti and Addis Ababa did exist, an economically justified railway network project was proposed. External experts from Yugoslavia and France proposed an extension for the existing metre gauge railway starting in Adama and going to Dilla. All studies at that time supported the economic viability of the extension line and France then offered a loan to construct the railway line between Adama and Dilla. This metre gauge railway network, however, did never materialize.

=== 21st century ===
In the year 2010, the Ethiopian government proposed a new railway network, The National Railway Network of Ethiopia. Some, if not most, of the proposed new railway lines were already planned decades before for the metre gauge railway (see the outline above).

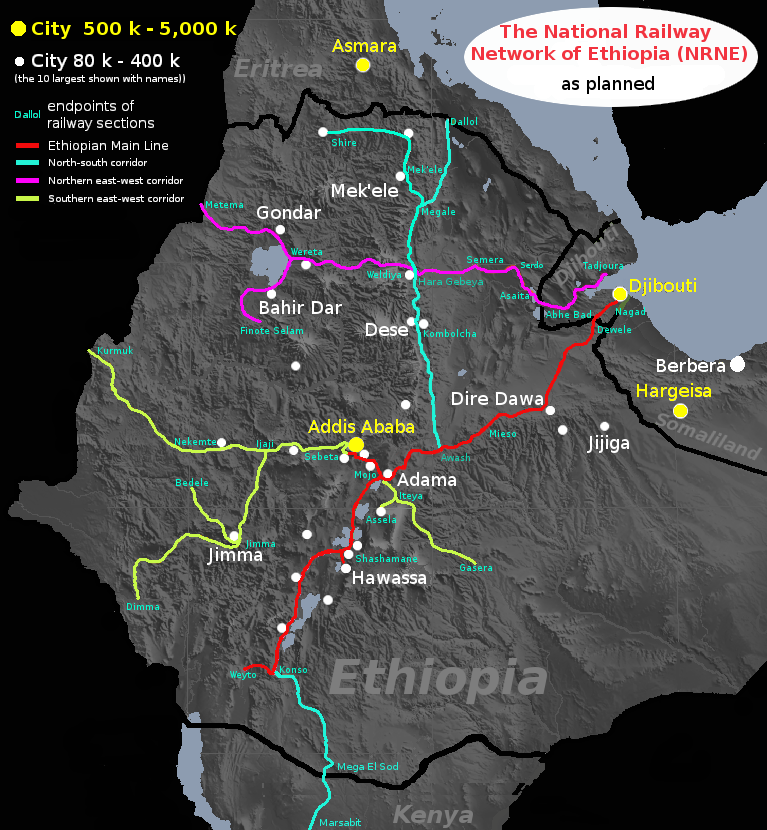
Map of the planned National Railway Network of Ethiopia with its different corridors

The new National Railway Network of Ethiopia was considered to serve a strategic goal to allow Ethiopia a sustainable and stable economic development. The rail transport of goods appeared favourable – if compared to road transport – in terms of volume, costs, safety and speed of transportation for both imports and exports. The network's primary purpose is then both to connect landlocked Ethiopia to the world market by ensuring seamless access to one or several sea ports and to include Ethiopia's economically most relevant regions. The primary port for Ethiopia is Djibouti. More than 95% of Ethiopia's trade passes through Djibouti. Commodities for export are mainly produced in the southern, southwestern and western parts of Ethiopia. In the National Railway Network of Ethiopia, the main line, (ERC routes 1 & parts of route 2, see the map and the table below) runs from the Port of Djibouti into this area, where 50% of all Ethiopian cities with a population of at least 80000 inhabitants are in immediate reach.

Apart from the main line, a number of auxiliary railways made up the planned railway network. A part of the financial budget required to construct some of the routes was considered to arrive through revenues from the ever-expanding railway network. Considered were also several extensions into neighboring countries, in particular into Kenya, South Sudan and Sudan. At an advanced planning stage is a strategic extension into Kenya. Kenya also set up a railway network program, called the LAPSSET corridor (also known as the Lamu corridor), which foresees joining an Ethiopian rail network at the border between both countries near Moyale. That interconnection would allow Ethiopia to gain strategic access to two more ports in addition to the port of Djibouti, the ports of Lamu, and Mombasa in Kenya.

The ERC split up the National Railway Network of Ethiopia into eight railway routes. The railway routes as presented by the ERC are ordered for their expected economic impact, those with the highest expected economic potential having the lowest numbers and coming first:

ERC-Route Nr.	Link	Status 2018	Course	Branches	Total Length
1	Addis Ababa–Djibouti Railway	operational	Sebeta–Addis Ababa–Modjo–Awash–Dire Dawa–Port of Doraleh		759 km
2		planned	Modjo–Shashamane–Arba Minch–Konso–Weito	Shashamane–Hawassa; Konso–Moyale	905 km
3		planned	Addis Ababa–Ambo–Jimma–Bedele	Jimma–Guraferda–Dimma	700 km
4		planned	Ambo–Nekemte–Asosa–Kurmuk		520 km
5	Awash–Weldiya Railway Weldiya–Mekelle Railway	under construction	Awash–Kombolcha–Weldiya–Mekelle	Mekelle–Shire (planned); Meisha–Dallol (planned)	757 km
6		planned	Finote Selam–Bahir Dar–Wereta–Weldya–Weldiya–Semera–Elidar–Tadjoura		734 km
7		planned	Wereta–Azezo–Metemma		244 km
8		planned	Adama–Iteya–Gasera	Iteya–Asella	248 km

=== Impact of Tigray War ===
In October 2021 it was reported that during the Tigray War armed forces of the Tigray People's Liberation Front had looted or destroyed most of the construction equipment in Kombolcha. They also damaged part of the almost-finished railway infrastructure, such as tunnels and bridges. The disruption has thrown several thousand railway workers out of work. As of July 2022 the construction site in Kombolcha was used as a camp for internally displaced persons. Nevertheless, the Ethiopian government still sees the project as a priority and intends to resume construction.

== Railway projects ==
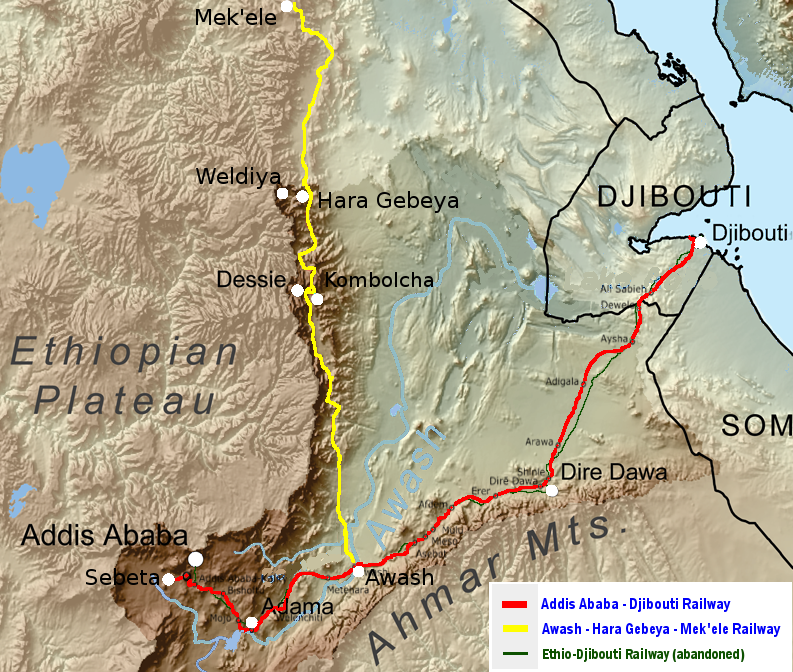
Existing railways in Ethiopia in 2018: Addis Ababa–Djibouti Railway Awash–Weldiya & Weldiya–Mekelle Railways Ethio–Djibouti Railway (sections operational)

=== Addis Ababa–Djibouti Railway ===
In 2011, one year after finalizing the plans on the national railway network, financing was secured for ERC-Route 1 (the Addis Ababa–Djibouti Railway) and construction was awarded to Chinese construction firms. In October 2016 and January 2017, the railway was completed and inaugurated.

The railway of 759 kilometres (472 mi) length was considered to cost around US$3.5b (US$4m per km of railway) while the Exim Bank of China facilitated a package, that resulted in loans of about US$2.5b in total for the Ethiopian section of the railway plus another US$500m for the Djiboutian section. A later survey revealed that the actual costs were around US$5.2m per km of railway, around 30% more than planned, resulting in total costs of around US$4.5b. As the loans came from China, most contractors were from China. The construction was an EPC/Turnkey project (FIDIC).

In January 2018, the railway became operational.

=== Northern Railways ===
Contradicting expectation, no contract and no financing was awarded to ERC-Route 2, so that neither the completion of the main line nor the link to Kenya's LAPSSET corridor or other railways in the economically interesting south and southwest could be started. Instead, ERC-Route 5 (split into the Awash–Weldiya Railway and the Weldiya–Mekelle Railway) were awarded to contractors in 2012, both railway lines running northwards from the town of Awash to Weldiya and then from Weldiya to Mekelle. It then took more than two years, until 2014, before financing was secured so that construction of both railways could start in February 2015. Their construction were started as EPC/Turnkey projects (FIDIC).

==== Awash–Weldiya Railway ====
The 392 km Awash–Weldiya Railway clearly is of strategic significance. It connects the whole north of Ethiopia, with almost 1/3rd of the Ethiopian population, with the main line and additionally through the Addis Ababa–Djibouti Railway with Ethiopia's lifeline, the port of Djibouti. Also, several large cities of Amhara Region are directly served by the railway and the railway will connect Ethiopian industrial centers like Kombolcha with the world. The main ERC facilities (maintenance workshops etc. at Kombolcha) will be located there. These facilities add to the 392 kilometres (244 mi) of the main railway, making a total of 428 kilometres (266 mi) of rails. For this railway, the ERC was able to secure almost as much external funding per km of railway as for the Addis Ababa–Djibouti Railway (loans of US$1.165b at total costs of US$1.7b), except that not from Chinese, but European investors facilitated through Credit Suisse. Funding was provided by a consortium of lenders, including Türk Eximbank, the Swedish National Export Credits Guarantee Board, Denmark's Export Credit Board, and Swiss Export Risk Insurance. The Turkish company Yapı Merkezi and its European subcontractors were chosen to perform the work. Substantial revenues are to be expected from this railway after completion.

The construction contract assumes costs per km of railway to be US$3.8m, which is surprisingly low for a challenging terrain with 56 bridges and 12 tunnels (tunnels: 10 kilometres (6.2 mi) length); theoretical calculations led to US$7m per km in 2015.

==== Weldiya–Mekelle Railway ====
The 216 km Weldiya–Mekelle Railway (with a total length of 241 km of rails) did not receive any known loan from foreign institutions (there have been several and always contradictory reports but a look at the balance sheet provides the numbers). Given the total construction budget of US$1.5b, expected costs were US$6.2m per km of rails. Without loans in place for buffering the investment, the ERC had to allocate more own budget for the construction of these 241 km of rails than for the in total ~1300 km of rails of the Addis Ababa–Djibouti Railway and of the Awash–Weldiya Railway altogether. The China Communications Construction Company became the prime contractor for the railway.

==== Potash, Ports and Peace ====
In 2011, the Weldiya–Mekelle Railway was to be joined by the Weldiya–Tadjoura Railway, which was to be constructed at the same time as the other railway. The rationale behind that was potash transport from Dallol to the port of Tadjoura. The Dallol site is undeveloped, but has the third-largest potash reserves worldwide (>2 billion tonnes in K_{2}O equivalents), the production costs would be US$38 per tonne, the lowest production costs worldwide for decades to come. Mass commodities like potash are usually best transported by railways to keep operating costs low. While the National Railway Network of Ethiopia was in the planning stage, potash prices on the world market fluctuated between below US$200 and US$875 per tonne, but were rather in the upper half of that range, which made railway construction an interesting precondition for large revenues from potash exports (with a good share of between 25 and 30% going to the Ethiopian government through taxes). As seaport for exports foreseen was the Port of Tadjoura in Djibouti, which was expanded from 2012 on with potash transports in mind. The port was finally opened in July 2017, dedicated to 4m tonnes of potash exports annually. At that time, in 2012, potash from Dallol was expected to be transported by road over 180 km to a railway site near Mekelle first. After that, rail transport was foreseen all the way to Tadjoura. In 2013, after a final feasibility study (completed in February 2013), it was considered to transport potash rather by road over 330 kilometres (210 mi) from Dallol to Serdo northeast of Semera, followed by rail transport from Serdo to Tadjoura; this railway line between Serdo and Tadjoura was to be constructed almost immediately. In addition, a new railway for the 330 kilometres (210 mi) between Serdo and Dallol was proposed as well, a railway line, that was not formerly considered for the National Railway Network of Ethiopia. Following this development, the section of the Weldiya–Tadjoura Railway between Weldiya and Serdo was dropped from any plans. For the construction of the remaining section between Serdo and Tadjoura, the ERC secured US$300m funding from India in 2013 and published a tender in August 2014, but only to postpone it in January 2015 indefinitely.

A privately built railway was then considered instead if the annual potash production at the Dallol site would exceed 5m tonnes. That was an outcome of a pre-feasibility study from June 2016.

Any start of potash mining however requires the development of the Dallol site. Such a development was foreseen to require foreign direct investments of more than US$2b. All that however was difficult given one major roadblock: the decades-old frozen and sometimes flaring-up war with Eritrea (for example during the Eritrean–Ethiopian War) at one of the most dangerous borders in the world. The Dallol potash reserves are shared between Ethiopia and Eritrea, and the Ethiopian concession areas are in part surrounded on two sides by Eritrean territory. Peace between Ethiopia and Eritrea – unlikely for decades – may however boost the potash business development. The word Peace was first used by the Ethiopian Prime Minister in April 2017.

Peace would serve both the Ethiopian and Eritrean economy and it would serve not only the potash business development in both countries but would also open a new rail transport corridor through both countries. On the Eritrean side, an old, now disbanded, and nearly 75 kilometres (47 mi) long colonial era railway, the Mersa Fatma–Colulli Railway served early potash transports in the 20th century. It did connect the Dallol potash site to the Eritrean Red Sea coast at the port town of Mersa Fatma, only 80 kilometres (50 mi) away. As the terrain is flat lowlands with a total elevation difference below 100 meters, a railway construction between Dallol and Mersa Fatma would pose no challenges. Economically (and also environmentally), such a short railway line would be very much favorable over haul trucking of hundreds of trucks daily on haul roads over 550 kilometres (340 mi) to the Port of Tadjoura in Djibouti. A Dallol–Mersa Fatma Railway could then be expanded within Ethiopia to a junction with the Weldiya–Mekelle Railway. That would connect the Railway to the national railway grid and would provide Ethiopia a strategically much wanted second port at Mersa Fatma for the Ethiopian rail network.

=== Debt management issues ===
After the announcement of the two northern railways in 2012, the ERC was not able to secure loans and enough funding for the construction of other new railway line projects or even parts of them. That mostly affected the southern and western parts of Ethiopia and therefore the areas with expected economic prospects. Even apparent success stories did not hold. In May 2015, the Prime Minister laid the foundation stone for the Addis Ababa–Jimma Railway between Addis Ababa and Jimma, with an extension to Bedele being foreseen. The ERC was considered to have secured a Brazilian loan of US$1b from the Brazilian Development Bank. The prime contractor would have been Andrade Gutierrez. However, the funding was cancelled shortly after and the construction did not commence.

In 2013, the IMF warned about the lack of a medium-term debt management strategy and lack of debt monitoring and issued concern about Ethiopia's public debt sustainability while explicitly mentioning the ERC and the two northern railways. At that time, the external debt of the ERC was at 6% of Ethiopia's GDP. In 2016, due to a lack of exports and an increasing external debt level of Ethiopia, the IMF raised a yellow flag and increased the debt sustainability risk from "low" to "moderate". Moreover, the IMF asked to reduce the recent pace of increase in external indebtedness, which were considered to be not sustainable over the medium term. A "high" risk was assigned to that part. The IMF asked for intensified efforts to reduce the external imbalance, and to increase and to diversify exports which would yield the highest economic growth dividend over the medium term.

A lack of exports means a lack of revenues to balance the increasing external debt (in US $). ERC planning issues contributed to that situation. The railway between Addis Ababa and Djibouti was officially constructed "as cheap as possible", lacking trunk lines, some operational infrastructure and the infrastructure for freight handling all the way down between Addis Ababa and Djibouti. That did not go well and did not allow traffic on the railway in the fiscal year 2016–17. This again did not result in immediate revenues – but expenses. The now-missing infrastructure (such as dry ports for freight handling) had to be quickly planned and constructed. That did not arrive without additional costs, that were neglected during the construction phase of the railway.

In late 2016, the external ERC debt was at 95.7 billion Birr, which translated into US$4.16b. That was a debt originating from the different loans (US$2.5b for loans facilitated by the Chinese Exim-Bank for the Addis Ababa–Djibouti Railway, US$1.165b for loans facilitated by Credit Suisse for the Awash–Weldiya Railway, and US$500m for loans for the Addis Ababa Light Rail). The number also indicated, that there were almost no revenues from previous years to balance the debt. In July 2016, the ERC had to start to pay interest – and at the beginning of 2017, the external ERC debt started to rise, indicating, that all loans had been used up and that for the first time own Ethiopian money (in US $) from external revenues had to be used for the ongoing construction works of the railways. The debt level of the ERC arrived at 120 billion Birr (US$5.2b) in June 2017 and at ~7.5% of Ethiopia's 2016 GDP. It was expected, that the ERC would arrive at an external debt level of US$7.2b or 8.2% of the GDP in 2020. These numbers make it difficult to consider starting new railway construction projects.

=== Railway project cancellations ===
Government officials started to discuss exit strategies and openly discussed the possibility to partially sell the ERC or the Addis Ababa–Djibouti Railway to private investors to balance the debt burden of the ERC. The construction of the Weldiya-Mekelle Railway was stopped temporarily. The head of the ERC resigned from his post.

Ethiopian Prime Minister Hailemariam Desalegn in April 2017 announced the cancellation of planned and future railway projects in mountainous northern and northwestern Ethiopia, in particular in Tigray. Reasons given for the cancellations were the costs of US$7–8m per km railway in rugged mountains instead of US$4m per km in flat lowlands or costs of roads of just US$1m per km. The Prime Minister stated, that a successful start of operations on the existing railways had priority for the foreseeable future. However, he also noted that peace with Eritrea, in particular, would make railways in the area likely again.

Given the high level of external debt, the Ethiopian government announced the cancellation of new railway projects in July 2017. That automatically meant that no new railways were to be built by public companies like the ERC in the foreseeable future.

=== Public-private partnerships ===
Instead, the Ethiopian government started legislation to implement Public-private partnerships (PPP) in all sectors of infrastructure development and also the rail transport sector and to lift a ban on private ownership on railway lines, hoping to attract foreign investors. Considered were public-private joint ventures.

In accordance with that, the ERC was able to sign a Memorandum of Understanding (MoU) to outsource the construction of ERC-Route 2 and its branches (the remainder of the main line) to a still to be named foreign company in March 2017, which will earn all revenues from the railway for an undisclosed number of years. The name of the company and the further conditions of the package might be revealed in October 2017, when the mentioned legislation on PPP's is considered to have passed the Ethiopian parliament.

=== Proposed lines ===
A branch line from either Diredawa or Ayisha in Ethiopia to Berbera Port in Somaliland is proposed in 2025.

== Railway network ==
=== Standard gauge railways ===
==== Overview ====
There are three interconnected railways between cities and the Ethiopian hinterland, which are foreseen to be the first railways of the National Railway Network of Ethiopia, see above. In addition, there is a light rail network. These are:

- Addis Ababa–Djibouti Railway (operational)
- Awash–Weldiya Railway (under construction)
- Weldiya–Mekelle Railway (under construction)
- Addis Ababa Light Rail (operational)

Of the around 1364 km of railways in January 2018, ~800 km were fully operational (the Addis Ababa Light Rail and the Addis Ababa–Djibouti Railway between Addis Ababa and Djibouti). Two railways are under construction, the Awash–Weldiya Railway with 392 km length, and the Weldiya–Mekelle Railway with 216 kilometres (134 mi) in length. The Awash–Weldiya Railway will see the first test runs on its first 270 kilometres (170 mi) between Awash and Kombolcha in Spring 2018. Two more railways are planned and are considered to be next in the pipeline:

- Modjo–Hawassa Railway (planned next, an extension of the Ethiopian Main Line to the south with future extensions towards Kenya)
- Sebeta–Ambo Railway (planned as the first common part of both the Sebeta-Ambo-Jimma and Sebeta-Ambo-Nekemte railways with future extensions to Bedele and the border with Sudan)

==== Railway specifications ====
In general, the railway specifications are based on the Chinese National Railway Class 2 Standard. However, with explicit demand by the Ethiopian Railway Corporation, some changes were made and adapted, which do not fit the Chinese standard.

The railway characteristics were first specified and used for the Addis Ababa–Djibouti Railway and in many cases had to be used for other railways as well to keep the installations compatible with each other. Trains should be able to use different railways without having to switch locomotives (as an example). The most straightforward example of compatibility is, that there is no break-of-gauge. The first railway was standard gauge, so all following railways also had to be standard gauge. The power supply had to be the same for all railways, the train protection system as well.

In the following, common features and specifications of all railways are shown. If there are differences between railways, this is indicated by a range given for values:

- Gauge: Standard gauge
- Couplers: Janney AAR
- Brakes: Air
- Electrification: Overhead catenary 25 kV AC / 50 Hz
- Target speed (passenger): 120 km/h (75 mph)
- Target speed (freight): 80–90 km/h (50–56 mph)
- Turnouts and Passing Loops: 100km/h on loop line.
- Maximum train load (freight): 3,000–3,500 tonnes (3,000–3,400 long tons; 3,300–3,900 short tons) gross
- Designed transport capacity: 10-20 million tonnes annually
- Length of arrival & departure track at passing loops: 850 m (dual locomotive: 880 m) [resulting max. train length ~800 m]
- Rail section: UIC 54 or 60kg rails CWR on concrete sleepers at 60cm spacing
- Minimum railway curve radius: 800–1,200 m (2,600–3,900 ft) [600–800 m (2,000–2,600 ft) at difficult locations]
  - See Minimum railway curve radius
- Maximum (ruling) gradient: 1.85-2.65 %
- Maximum vehicle loading gauge height : 5300 mm
- Trains run on the: Left
- Railway signalling: semi-automatic block or automatic block
- Train protection system: ETCS-2 SIL4
- Level crossings: permitted (no full grade separation)
- Formation: Double track or Single track (suitable for future doubling)
- Axle loading: 25 Tonnes
- Structure Gauge: UIC compatible
- The loading gauge width for new standard gauge railways in Africa is 3,400 mm (11 ft 2 in) the same as the original Shinkansen in Japan, and copied by China, South Korea, Ethiopia, Kenya and possibly Tanzania and Nigeria.

px300

==== Major railway infrastructure ====
Major pieces of infrastructure are, for example, dry ports for heavy containers or fuel depots for diesel and gasoline. Strategic ones have to be connected to the railway network. The following infrastructural projects are to be linked / connected to the Ethiopian railway network through industrial spurs (spur lines):

- Modjo Dry Port (spur line and dry port operational, main import/export facility of Ethiopia)
- Dire Dawa Dry Port (spur line & dry port under construction in 2017, direct access to the neighboring Industrial Park and the Dire Dawa International Airport)
- Kombolcha Dry Port (spur line & dry port under construction in 2017, direct access to the neighboring Industrial Park and the Kombolcha Airport)
- Mekelle Dry Port (spur line planned, dry port under construction in 2017, direct access to the neighboring Mekelle Airport)
- Dukem Fuel Depot (spur line & depot planned)
- Awash Fuel Depot (spur line under construction in 2017, depot operational, depot expansion works)
- Adama Industrial Park (branch line in the planning stage, Industrial park under construction in 2017)
- Ayisha Industrial Park (both park and spur line planned)

Directly north of Kombolcha, the railway will get a few major infrastructure elements, in particular an operations centre for the entire network. There is the ERC main depot for rolling stock, the main maintenance workshops and also the main logistics center of the whole Railway Network of Ethiopia.

The ERC bought a rescue train for emergency operations (e.g. a heavy rail crane for emergency operations), that will be stationed at the Kombolcha workshops. The facilities will include eight rail tracks within the operations centre which will have a size of 15000 m^{2}.

Besides the main rail depot at Kombolcha, another depot exists in Addis Ababa (Indode) and in Dire Dawa, where METEC is located, a large state-owned company which in its Dire Dawa subsidiary is dedicated to the construction and maintenance of rail goods wagons.

==== Railway stations ====
Apart from the major railway infrastructure (freight yards, dry ports) considered to handle freight trains, the railways also feature railway stations for passenger trains. These railway stations along the railways most often have a single platform for passengers to enter or to leave trains. These platforms allow access without having the need to use stairs. Some have two platforms connected through a footbridge above the overhead catenary system. The platforms are roofed to protect passengers against sun, wind, and rain.

Railway stations for passenger trains always have a station building directly attached to the back of the principal platform. Consequently, all railway stations with a single platform have space for only one platform line and do not allow the presence of more than one train at the platform at the same time. In contrast, railway stations with two platforms have the space for two or three platform lines. All platforms are between 200 metres (660 ft) and 400 metres (1,300 ft) long.

The station buildings are used for ticketing and for refreshments and contain waiting rooms and even rooms for prayers. They have media available (at least electricity, water). The outer appearance of station buildings of the Addis Ababa–Djibouti Railway shows some sort of architectural eclecticism including Ethiopian elements with some Chinese interpretation and rounded elements. The railway station buildings on the Awash–Weldiya Railway are rather functional and rectangular.

=== Metre gauge railway ===
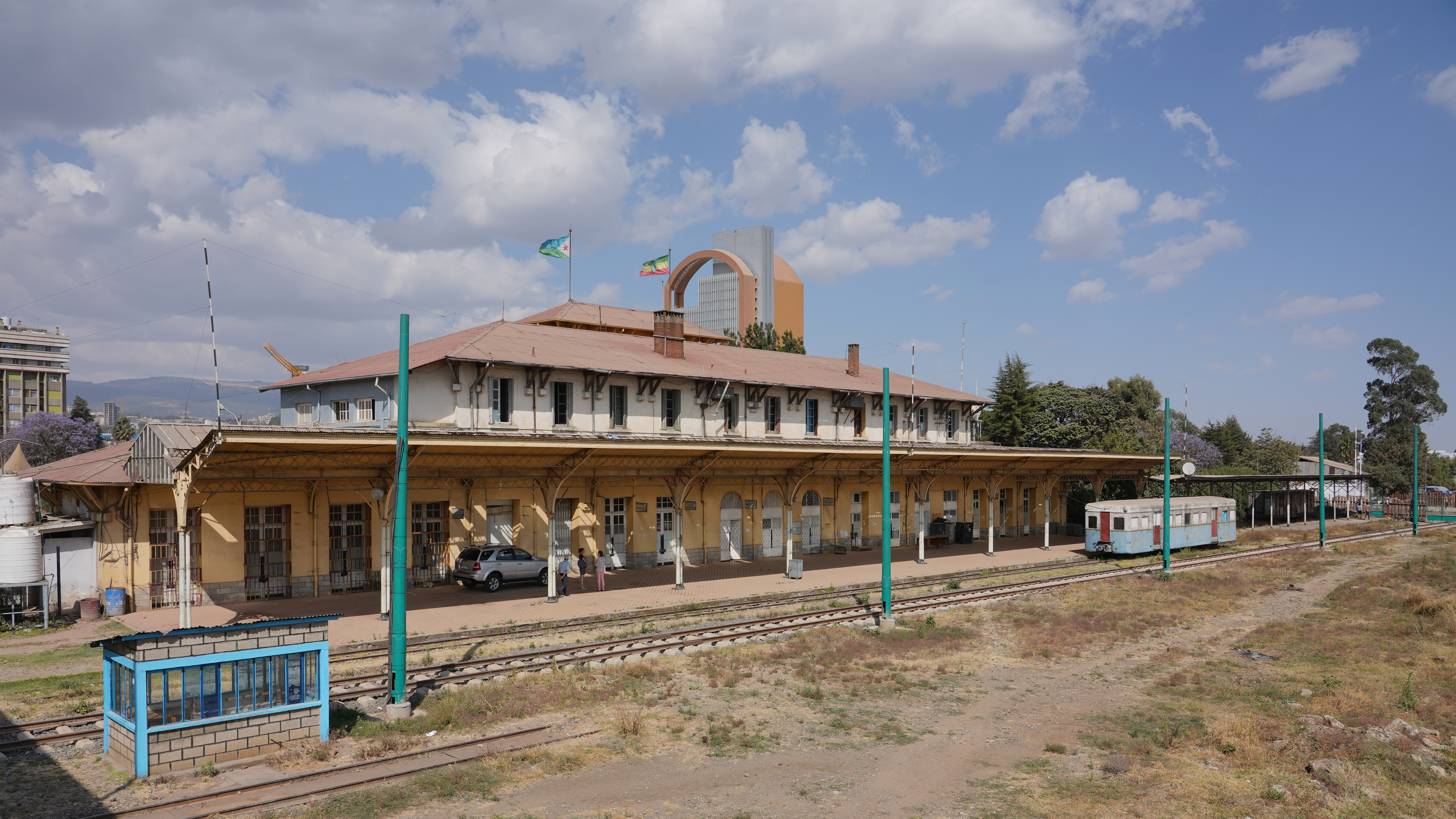
The old Addis Ababa La Gare train station.

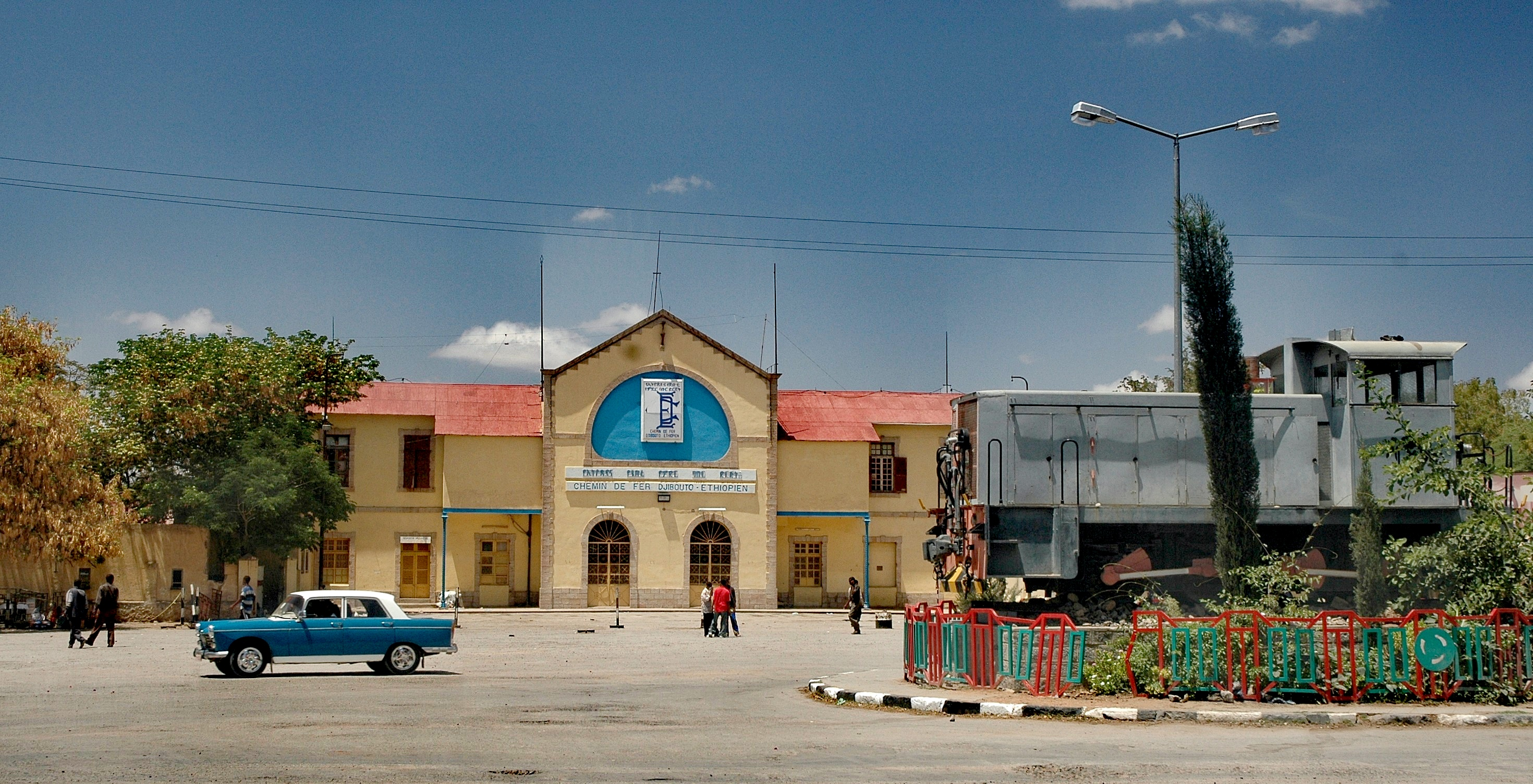
The old Dire Dawa train station.

==== Railway status ====
A 207 km long section of the old non-electrified single track metre gauge Ethio–Djibouti Railway from 1917 is still in operation between Dire Dawa and Guelile to the northeast of Dire Dawa. This section saw a partial rehabilitation in the six years between 2007–2012 and still sees a bi-weekly and combined freight and passenger service serving the regional economy in Eastern Ethiopia and around Dire Dawa. There are no indications that the rail transport on this railway section will cease to operate. Another 150 kilometres (93 mi) west of Dire Dawa between Dire Dawa and Mieso have been announced to be under repair in 2018 to make them operational again. Some rolling stock (diesel locos, passenger coaches and goods wagons) is in operation as well.

Between Addis Ababa and Dire Dawa, the railway was abandoned and in part built over by several projects between 2008 and 2014, while traffic between Dire Dawa and Djibouti was possible until spring 2014. On Djiboutian territory and beyond Guelile, the railway has been abandoned since. Therefore, of the originally 784 kilometres (487 mi) of the Ethio–Djibouti Railway, 475 kilometres (295 mi) are destroyed or abandoned while 357 kilometres (222 mi) is still in operation or are being prepared to go back into operation. Most bridges and viaducts on the abandoned parts of the railway are still intact and can be visited.

==== Railway stations ====
Two major railway stations survived.

1. The Addis Ababa railway terminal, La Gare, is a century-old historical building. In 2008 a street project threatened it but the building survived and was not demolished.
2. The Dire Dawa railway terminal is even older than the Addis Ababa railway terminal. It is still in use.

== Rolling stock ==
=== Standard gauge railways ===
To meet modern railway standards, all the rolling stock dedicated to rail transport in Ethiopia has been designed and adapted to the harsh environmental conditions of Ethiopia. Braking performance has been improved to account for the differences in altitude. As temperatures and solar radiation in the area can vary greatly between night and day and from high mountain (greater than 2,400 metres (7,900 ft)) to the sea, in order to prevent aging caused by thermal shock and by high ultraviolet light in the plateau environment, all components – rubber, cables, and others – have been specifically designed, using laminated glass for blocking more than 90% of UV penetration.

==== Locomotives ====
All locomotives were imported from China. 41 available electric locomotives are designated to haul freight trains and to perform freight handling, while only three electric locomotives serve passenger transport services. In addition, a number of diesel locomotives are to provide services off the main line.

Type	Manufacturer – Platform	Quantity	Serial numbers	Operation mode	Max. speed [km/h]	Power [kW]	Refs.
Electric locomotive	CRRC – HXD1C	3	ERP 0001 – ERP 0003 (ERP: Ethiopian Railways Passenger)	Passenger transport (main line)	120	7200	
Electric locomotive	CRRC – HXD1C	32	ERF 0001 – ERF 0032 (ERF: Ethiopian Railways Freight)	Freight transport (main line)	120	7200	
Diesel locomotive	CRRC – DF4DH	3	(DF4D 418-0xx) (not owned by Ethiopian Railways)	Freight transport (main line)	100	2940	
Diesel locomotive	CRRC – DF10DDB (export version: CKD3A)	6	ERS 0001 – ERS 0006 (ERS: Ethiopian Railways Switcher)	Shunting (Port of Doraleh – Nagad)	100	1873	

The locomotives were derived from the platforms mentioned in the table above. The electric locomotives have different liveries. The ERP locomotives come with the Ethiopian national colors (green-yellow-red), the ERF locomotives replace the green by blue (red-yellow-blue), the DF4DH-derived locomotives are sky-blue while the ERS switchers are entirely yellow with one horizontal stripe in the national colors. All locomotives have been adapted to the harsh climatic conditions of Ethiopia and provide air-conditioning built in for the engineer.

The platform data for the HXD1C indicate, that the available power of 7200 kW is also available for regenerative braking. Two freight locos can couple and can do two-locomotive train control with heavy freight trains for railway slopes >0.9 %. In addition, the electric locomotives hauling passenger trains come with a dedicated power supply transformer to provide electric power for the air-conditioning / heating units of the passenger cars under the extreme climatic conditions of Ethiopia.

The diesel locomotives in particular were modified to work at different altitudes (from sea level to beyond 2400 metres) and to work under very high temperatures in excess of 50 °C in the desert areas of northeastern Ethiopia and Djibouti. They have a special computer-adjusted working mode of the diesel engine under such high temperature. In addition, the diesel locos have two different dust filters integrated in the air supply of the diesel engine in order to be able to work in especially dusty desert conditions.

==== Passenger cars (coaches) ====
Passenger coaches were built on the China Railway model 25G design, decorated with national Ethiopian colors. All passenger cars based on the 25G platform offer two toilettes, two washing dishes and heaters for hot water.

Type	Manufacturer – Platform	Quantity	Serial numbers	Travel Class	Max. speed [km/h]	Seats / Berths	Configuration	Notes
Chair car (Coach)	CRC – YZ25G	20	HSC 0001 – HSC 0020 (HSC: Hard Seat Car)	Economy Class	120	118 seats	3+2 seats per row	
Couchette car	CRC – YW25G	4	HBC 0001 – HBC 0004 (HBC: Hard Berth Car)	Economy Class	120	66 berths	11 compartments (no doors)	
Couchette car (Sleeper)	CRC – RW25G	4	SBC 0001 – SBC 0004 (SBC: Soft Berth Car)	Business Class	120	36 berths	9 compartments (with doors)	
Dining car	CRC – CA25G	2	DPC 0001 – DPC 0002 (DPC: Diner Pick Car)	---	120	50 seats	13 tables + galley	

Each passenger car shows its code near the four entrance doors, consisting of three letters and a 4-digit number (for example HSC 0017 or DPC 0002). Hard is the most basic coach design of China Railways. A translation of Hard into Economy Class is most appropriate. Because the Ethiopian HSC cars are almost identical to the Chinese Hard seat cars, travelling guides for trains in China might also be helpful for Ethiopian trains. Ethiopian Railways does not offer true Sleeping car services nor does Ethiopian Railways offer Business Class seats or First class travel. But it is possible to make a reservation for a single person, which includes a whole lockable compartment in Soft Berth Cars (4 berths per compartment), which makes the compartment a Solo soft sleeper.

==== Goods wagons ====
A total of 1100 goods wagons are in use on Ethiopian Railways. They were built by Baotou Beifang ChuangYe Co. Ltd (BFCY) in China. Half were assembled in China, and the other half were assembled by Metals and Engineering Corporation in Dire Dawa. All others were assembled in China.

The information on the wagons shown in the table below was outlined by an Ethiopia Railway Assessment.as part of a Logistics Capacity Assessment (LCA) by the World Food Programme.

Type	Part	Serial numbers	Quantity	Goods to be transported
Flat wagon	NW5	ER0391 – ER0940	550	International containers of all sorts and road trailers
Box wagon	PW2	ER0001 – ER0220	220	Goods that should not be exposed to sun, rain, snow – which are boxed and bagged paper products, appliance auto parts, beverages,...
Gondola	CW3; CW4	ER0221 – ER0350	130	Building materials: steel, coal, core, wood, ...
Tank wagon	GW2	ER0951 – ER1060	110	Liquids such as fuel (gasoline, diesel etc.)
Covered hopper	KW2	ER0351 – ER0370	20	Materials (grain, flour, fertilizer, salt, sugar, clay lime) to be weather-protected
Open hopper	KW3	ER0371 – ER0390	20	Bulk materials such as coal, coke, stone, sand, ores, gravel, scrap material etc.
Lumber racks	NW6	ER1061 – ER1080	20	Lumber and wooden building material
Car transporter (double deck)	NW7	ER1081 – ER1100	20	Transporting vehicles and automobiles, motorail services in connection with passenger trains
Refrigerated van	BW1	ER0941 – ER0950	10	Fresh and perishable food stuffs such as fish, meat, vegetable, fruits etc.

== See also ==
- East African Railway Master Plan, railway network planned to be linked with this network.
- Railway stations in Ethiopia
- Transport in Ethiopia
