= Addis Ababa–Kombolcha–Dessie Expressway =

Planned toll road connecting Addis Ababa, Kombolcha and Dessie in Ethiopia

Route information
- Length: 352.2 km (218.8 mi)

Location
- Country: Ethiopia

Highway system
- Transport in Ethiopia

The Addis Ababa–Kombolcha–Dessie Expressway is a planned toll road that will connect Addis Ababa to Kombolcha and Dessie in the Amhara Region of Ethiopia. It is among the major expressway projects being developed as part of Ethiopia's national road expansion program. The road is being developed under a public-private partnership framework, with the Government of Ethiopia seeking private capital investment for its construction and operation, which is estimated to cost $2.32 billion. The highway, spanning an estimated 352.2-kilometre (218.8 mi) in length, aims to reduce congestion and improve connectivity between Addis Ababa and the Amhara Region. Upon completion, it is expected to significantly cut travel time between the two cities compared to the existing route.

== Junctions ==
The Addis Ababa–Kombolcha–Dessie Expressway is part of Ethiopia's broader expressway network, which the government is developing through private capital investment. The expressway will connect Addis Ababa through Kombolcha to Dessie in the Amhara Region, serving as a key corridor for trade and passenger movement along the northeastern route out of the capital.
