= Awash–Weldiya Railway =

Unfinished standard gauge railway in Ethiopia

- Schematic of the Awash-Weldiya railway.

Overview
- Status: Under construction
- Owner: Ethiopian Railway Corporation
- Locale: Ethiopia
- Termini: Awash; Weldiya
- Stations: 10 (passengers)

Service
- Type: Heavy rail
- System: Ethiopian Railway Network

Technical
- Line length: 392 km (244 mi)
- Num of tracks: single track
- Track gauge: 1,435 mm (4 ft 8 1/2 in) standard gauge
- Loading gauge: 5300 mm
- Electrification: Overhead line 25 kV AC / 50 Hz
- Operating speed: 120 km/h (75 mph) (passenger); 80–90 km/h (50–56 mph) (freight)
- Signalling: semi-automatic block & ETCS-2 SIL4
- Highest elevation: 2,250 m (7,380 ft)
- Maximum incline: 2.65 %

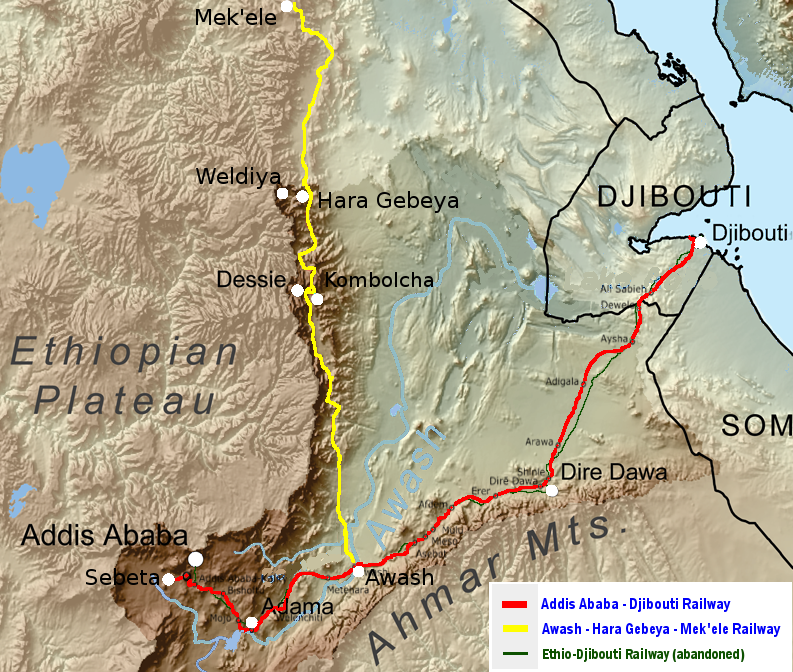
Railways in Ethiopia in 2017: Addis Ababa–Djibouti Railway Awash–Hara Gebeya (Weldiya)–Mekelle Railways Ethio–Djibouti Railway

The Awash–Weldiya Railway is a standard gauge railway under construction, that will serve as a northward extension of the new Ethiopian National Railway Network.

The railroad's primary purpose is to connect the north of Ethiopia with the Addis Ababa–Djibouti Railway at the Awash junction and therefore connecting it with the world economy through the Port of Djibouti and also with the southern parts of Ethiopia with its capital, Addis Ababa.

The 392 km Awash–Weldiya Railway clearly is of strategic significance. It connects the whole north of Ethiopia with almost one-third of the Ethiopian population with the Addis Ababa–Djibouti Railway and with Ethiopia's lifeline, the port of Djibouti. Also, several large cities of Amhara Region are directly served by the Railway and the railway will connect Ethiopian industrial centers like Kombolcha with the world.

== Route and description ==
The railway bypasses the up to 1200 metres deep Blue Nile canyon to the west of the railway, a canyon, which is a major blocking feature for travel between northern Ethiopia and southern Ethiopia. It also runs parallel to the densely populated eastern escarpment of the northwestern Ethiopian Highlands, as a gate to several tangential areas further west, such as Lake Tana and cities like Gondar.

The single-track railway starts at Awash at the Awash River, the main river in the Afar Triangle area of the Great Rift Valley. The route runs in the NNW-direction. The Awash station is at the junction with the Addis Ababa–Djibouti Railway. The station is only the second in Ethiopia to have two platforms for passenger trains (the other one is the main Furi-Labu railway station in Addis Ababa). It then runs through low-lying areas and then along irrigated plantations at the Awash River in Amibara woreda, the lowest elevation point of the railway (700 metres) has been reached. It then runs for 80 km through semi-arid, hilly and almost unpopulated areas, no railway station is foreseen here. After arriving at the eastern escarpment of the western Ethiopian Highlands, a second major railway station along the railway is reached, also with two platforms for passenger trains. This is Shewa Robit, a town at 1300 metres elevation, which is one of the gates to the Highlands. Up the road from here is the major city of Debre Berhan at an elevation of 2800 metres, a few dozen km to the southwest. Shewa Robit serves as the entry point for Debre Berhan and other destinations to the west and the middle section of the Awash valley to its east.

After Shewa Robit, the railway runs north through the rugged landscape that makes up the eastern escarpment of the Highlands of Ethiopia. The sections between Shewa Robit and Weldiya see lots of tunnels and bridges because of that. This escarpment has mostly originated from normal faulting along a dip-slip fault line as a result of plate tectonics in the Horn of Africa and in the Afar Triangle. It is a seismically highly active region with active faults, that can easily see earthquakes with magnitudes >6.5. The bridges along this part of the railway look quite fragile, as they are built from hollow structural sections. These are considered to flex in case of a major earthquake to save the railway. More rigid structures have been avoided here to prevent failure of the bridges.

After having passed a few towns with minor railway stations, the railway reaches its third major station with two platforms, Kombolcha. Kombolcha is a major city, as is the nearby regional capital Dessie, its twin-city a few km to the west. One is at 1800 m elevation (Kombolcha), the other at 2500 m (Dessie). Both cities serve as the second gate to the Ethiopian Highlands (after Shewa Robit), with central Ethiopian cities like Debre Markos being in reach by road further west from here. At Kombolcha, there are major infrastructural facilities for the whole railway network of Ethiopia and also a new airport just 2 km away from the railway station.

The railway continues northwards along the eastern escarpment of the Ethiopian Highlands. After another major railway station at Hayk (at Lake Hayq) at 2050 m elevation and another small railway station, the railway reaches its final destination, Weldiya, a small town, at an elevation of 1800 m. 10 km to the west of Weldiya, another major Ethiopian city is located at an elevation of 1900 m, Weldiya. Weldiya / Weldiya are another major gate (the third one) to the Ethiopian Highlands with a road to Lake Tana and the surrounding major cities like Gondar and Debre Tabor. In addition, UNESCO World Heritage Sites like Lalibela are just around the corner from Weldiya. That makes the railway station a possible major point of interest for tourism and passenger train traffic.

Weldiya, although a small town, is considered to become a railway hub in the future. It will be the terminus of a total of four railways, if the Railway Network of Ethiopia becomes a reality. Besides the Awash–Weldiya Railway, which terminates here, another major railway will extend the railway to the north, to Tigray. That is the Weldiya–Mek'ele Railway. To the east is the Weldiya–Tadjoura Railway. To the west, in extension of the Tadjoura railway, there will be the Lake Tana–Weldiya Railway. All are planned except the railway to Mek'ele, which is under construction.

== Railway characteristics ==
The railway was based in many aspects on the railway characteristics pre-defined by the Addis Ababa–Djibouti Railway to keep the railways interoperable. However, a few things (like the maximum slope) were adapted to the special conditions in the mountainous area.

- Gauge: Standard gauge
- Track length: 392 km (428 km with 25 km of station lines and 11 km service lines)
- Tunnels: 12 (6 between Awash and Kombolcha, 6 between Kombolcha and Weldiya), total length 9,830 m

During the planning stage, 14 tunnels were foreseen and numbered. Two have been scrapped (tunnels 1 and 12), but the numbering scheme remained the same. Until the tunnels will get names, the original numbering will persist and will be used.

- Bridges: 65 (including overpasses, 20 with length >100 m, longest bridge with 658 m length at 57 m depth), total length 7,165 m
- Culverts: 917, total length 41 km.
- Couplers: Janney AAR
- Brakes: Air
- Electrification: Overhead catenary 25 kV AC / 50 Hz
- Train protection system: ETCS-2 (SIL-4) with 12 radio towers
- Maximum vehicle loading gauge height : 5300 mm
- Target speed (passenger): 120 km/h (75 mph)
- Target speed (freight): 80 km/h (50 mph), in rugged terrain 90 km/h (56 mph)
- Maximum train load (freight): 3,000 tonnes (3,000 long tons; 3,300 short tons) gross
- Minimum railway curve radius: 1,200 m (3,900 ft) (600–800 m or 2,000–2,600 ft at difficult locations)
- Designed transport capacity: 10 million tonnes annually (target is 8.5 million tonnes of freight plus passenger traffic)
- Maximum gradient: 2.65 % ( 1 in 38)
- Level crossings: permitted (no full grade separation)

The single-track section is equipped with passing loops with three lines. Often, the passing loops are present at the location of train stations. The total length of passing loops is designed to be 1100 m. The railway line is almost fully electrified. Power is transmitted to eight substations at 230 kV (3 substations) and 130 kV (5 substations). Traction power is supplied at 48 km intervals.

Directly north of Kombolcha, the railway will have a few major infrastructure elements, in particular an operations centre. There is the ERC main depot for rolling stock, the main maintenance workshops and also the main logistics center of the whole Railway Network of Ethiopia. The ERC bought a rescue train for emergency operations (e.g. a heavy rail crane for emergency operations), that will be stationed at the Kombolcha workshops. The facilities will include eight rail tracks within the operations centre which will have a size of 15.000 m^{2}.

Directly opposite to the operations centre across the railway, there is a freight yard with dry port close to an industrial park and also the Kombolcha Airport. Everything is in reach within minutes, from the Kombolcha railway station to the dry port, the operations centre and the airport.

== History ==
After the new National Railway Network of Ethiopia was considered to be constructed from 2010 on, the Awash–Weldiya Railway was second to be constructed after the Addis Ababa–Djibouti Railway. The railway was awarded to constructors in 2012. It then took more than two years, until 2014, before financing was secured so that construction of both railways could start in February 2015.

For this railway, the ERC was able to secure loans of US $1.165b at total costs of US $1.7b. This was facilitated through Credit Suisse. Funding was provided by a consortium of lenders, including Türk Eximbank, the Swedish National Export Credits Guarantee Board, Denmark's Export Credit Board, and Swiss Export Risk Insurance. The Turkish company Yapı Merkezi and its European subcontractors were chosen to do the work.

The railway, internally dubbed AKH Railway, was to be constructed in two phases. The section from Awash to Kombolcha, 270 km long, represented the 1st section of the railway, while the remaining 122 km to Weldiya represented the second section. A first wave of construction started on this 2nd section in 2017. For the 1st section between Awash and Kombolcha it was expected to have all 270 km of rails laid in August 2017 so that first test runs on the railway were announced. A first test run reached a speed of 100 km/h on the railway. However, the track laying required more work, the final track pads for the first phase of the main railway line (without counting in station and service lines) were laid in January 2018 at Awash at the junction to the Addis Ababa–Djibouti railway. In January 2019 the construction of the Awash-Kombolcha Railway Line has reached 97 percent.

The construction contract assumes costs per km of railway to be US $3.8m, which is surprisingly low for a challenging terrain with 12 tunnels; theoretical calculations led to US $7m per km in 2015. This gives rise to the speculation, that either another (and indirect) European funding plays a role or that only the first phase of the railway between Awash and Kombolcha was covered by the US $1.7b contract. In the latter case, the costs per km would rise to about US $6.3m per km, which sounds reasonable. Also, according to Yapı Merkezi, the main construction firm, the financing of the second phase between Kombolcha and Weldiya hasn't been fully secured by August 2017 and construction works there are uncertain to some extent.

=== Tigray War ===
In October 2021 it was reported that during the Tigray War armed forces of the Tigray People's Liberation Front had looted or destroyed most of the construction equipment in Kombolcha. They also damaged part of the almost-finished railway infrastructure, such as tunnels and bridges. The disruption has thrown several thousand railway workers out of work. Immediately, the Turkish construction contractor Yapi Merkezi abandoned the project on grounds of safety concerns as the two-year armed conflict raged near some of the project sites. Yapi Merkezi claimed compensation from the (ERC) for equipment and works damaged or looted by the fighting. The dispute has been taken to the London Court of International Arbitration, where ERC claimed 1,6 billion USD in damages resulting from contractor abandoning the project completely.In September 2026 it was ruled by the LCIA that Yapi Merkezi should receive, from ERC, a net sum of $307.6m. According to the deputy CEO of ERC, Seleshi Kassa, 70% of the claims brought by Turkish contractor were defended against.

As of July 2022 the construction site in Kombolcha was used as a camp for internally displaced persons. Nevertheless, the Ethiopian government still sees the project as a priority and intends to resume construction.

== See also ==
- Rail transport in Ethiopia
- East African Railway Master Plan, railway network planned to be linked with this line.
- Railway stations in Ethiopia
