= Hara Gebeya =

Town in Amhara Region, Ethiopia

Hara Gebeya ሃራ ገበያ
- Location within Ethiopia
- Coordinates: 11°50′N 39°44′E
- Country: Ethiopia
- Region: Amhara Region
- Zone: North Wollo Zone
- Woreda: Guba Lafto

Population (2019)
  - Total: 28,096
- Time zone: UTC+3 (EAT)

Hara Gebeya (Amharic: ሃራ ገበያ, "Hara Market") or Hara is a town in north-eastern Ethiopia. It is located in Guba Lafto woreda in the Amhara Region. It is situated at an altitude of 1520 metres. In 2019, it had a population of 28,096.

== Demographics ==
In 2019, the town had a population of 28,906, comprising 14,188 males and 13,908 females. According to a 2017 survey, 86.1% of population was Muslim, while 13.9% was Ethiopian Orthodox. 69.4% of the population was illterate, while 14.6% of the population had at most a primary education and 3.1% attained secondary education or higher. There was one ART clinic, 7 health posts, and 5 private clinics in the town.

== Transport ==
Hara Gebeya is planned to become a major junction in Ethiopia's national railway network. It will receive a railway station in one of the new standard gauge railways connecting Addis Ababa with a port at Djibouti. It is the terminus of the Awash–Weldiya Railway and starting point of the Weldiya–Mekelle Railway, both of which will, despite their names, bypass Weldiya entirely. It will also be the starting point of the proposed Hara-Gebeya-Asaita-Tadjoura railway.
