= RSDP =

RSDP may refer to:

- Root System Description Pointer; see ACPI
- Road Sector Development Program, in Transport in Ethiopia
