= A4 road (Ethiopia) =

Road in Ethiopia

A4 Road

Route information
- Maintained by Ethiopia National Highways Authority

Major junctions
- North end: Addis Ababa
- South end: Gedi Adis

Location
- Country: Ethiopia

Highway system
- Transport in Ethiopia

The A4 Road is a national route in Ethiopia. It runs from Addis Ababa, the central city of Ethiopia, to Gedi Adis located in the west is roughly 444 kilometers long and stretches from east to west. The route links the central Ethiopian highlands to its western region thereby enabling people, goods and services movement.

== Route ==
The A4 highway passes through Ethiopia mainly in the east–west direction, starting from Addis Ababa, which is the capital city and ending at the western town of Gedi Adis. At this terminus, the road forks into two separate roads namely, B40 and B43. In Addis Ababa, the A4 is designed in a way that it has two lanes going in either direction or a dual carriageway while as for the other parts of the route, it is a simple single-lane road. A notable characteristic of the A4 is its winding trajectory, which traverses varied terrain with minimal altitude fluctuations until reaching Nekemte. At this point, the road embarks on a gradual descent from an elevation of 2,600 meters to 2,000 meters. Further west of Nekemte, the road undergoes a more pronounced descent, ultimately reaching an altitude of 1,200 meters. The A4 culminates in the small town of Gedi Adis, marking the end of this as the transportation artery.

== History ==
Importantly, during the Italian administration of Ethiopia, which ran from 1936 through 1940, Ghimbi used to be the main terminus along A4 road that connects to Addis Ababa. There were plans for extending this road southwards towards Sudan at that time. As such, there's no other route like this one; it is actually an extension of the original road between these two places called Addis Ababa and Ghimbi. Apart from Addis Ababa urban city where there more lanes however nothing much has changed on this route since its initial upgrade as other places along it have not changed too much since then. Previously, the road was designated as Route 5, extending to the Sudanese border. However, with the introduction of a new numbering system in 2013, the road was renumbered as the A4, with its terminus shortened to Ghimbi. Concurrently, the section leading to the Sudanese border was renumbered as the B40, distinguishing it from the revised A4 route.
