= Weldiya–Mekelle Railway =

Standard gauge railway transiting Weldiya and Mekelle cities in Ethiopia

- Schematic diagram of the Weldiya-Mekelle railway.

Overview
- Status: Under construction
- Owner: Ethiopian Railway Corporation
- Locale: Ethiopia
- Termini: Weldiya; Mekelle
- Stations: 5 (passengers)

Service
- Type: Heavy rail
- System: Ethiopian Railway Network

Technical
- Line length: 216 km (134 mi)
- Number of tracks: single track
- Track gauge: 1,435 mm (4 ft 8 1/2 in) standard gauge
- Loading gauge: 5,300 mm (17 ft 5 in)
- Electrification: Overhead line 25 kV AC / 50 Hz
- Operating speed: 120 km/h (75 mph) (passenger); 80–90 km/h (50–56 mph) (freight)
- Signalling: semi-automatic block & ETCS-2
- Highest elevation: 2,393 m (7,851 ft)
- Maximum incline: 2.55 %

The Weldiya–Mekelle Railway is a standard gauge railway under construction, that will serve as a northward extension of the new Ethiopian National Railway Network and connects Mekelle to Addis Ababa and Djibouti via the Awash-Weldiya railway.

== Route and description ==
The 216 km long single-track railway is the northern section of one line of 608 km in all, beginning in Awash station of the Addis Ababa–Djibouti Railway. The station for Weldiya will be one kilometer east of Hara Gebeya, a town 17 km east of Weldiya, with only a third of the city's population. Only three railway stations are major ones, one at Meisha, one at Kobo and one at Mekelle. For the first 40 km after Weldiya, the railway runs through rugged terrain at the eastern escarpment of the Ethiopian Highland at an elevation between 1400 and 1830 meters. After 50 km, behind Kobo, the railway enters, for the next ~70 km, a flat sedimentary basin with almost no hills and no prominent landscape features. The elevation difference is only 190 meters. The Alamata and Mehoni railway stations are here, serving a few towns.

After 115 km, a hilly and deserted landscape appears that leads to Meisha station in the Megale woreda. Megale is a woreda of Afar region, few persons are living here. Nevertheless, Meisha railway station is possibly the most interesting along the route, as the station (which is almost at the lowest point of the entire railway, at 1,235 meters) provides relatively easy access to the Danakil depression, one of the hottest places on earth with several well-known volcanoes like Erta Ale and other tourist destinations. Meisha station also offers access to Abala (or Shiket), one of the Afar capital towns. Behind Meisha, the railway is running across sandy alluvial fans for the next 18 km before it makes a turn to the northwest and an elevation jump of 920 meters, from 1360 m to 2280 m elevation in just 40 km. The railway has an almost constant slope of 2.5% here - over 35 km - with many tunnels (up to 3,662 meters long) and bridges - and also with the passing loop station of Adi Gudem in the middle. After 202 km, the railway reaches the flat Ethiopian highland and reaches its terminus at Mekelle Airport after 216 km, east of Mekelle. Shortly before, a branch line will connect a dry port near Mekelle city with the railway line.

== Railway characteristics ==
The railway was based in many aspects on the railway characteristics pre-defined by the Addis Ababa–Djibouti Railway to keep the railways interoperable. However, a few things (like the maximum slope) were adapted to the special conditions in the mountainous area.

- Gauge: Standard gauge
- Tunnels: 9, total length 10 km (the longest of 3662 m length and 7 of the tunnels being between Mekelle and Megale)
- Bridges: 76, total length 18 km
- Culverts: 392
- Couplers: Janney AAR
- Brakes: Air
- Electrification: Overhead catenary 25 kV AC / 50 Hz
- Train protection system: ETCS-2 (SIL-4) with 12 radio towers
- Maximum vehicle loading gauge height: 5300 mm
- Target speed (passenger): 120 km/h (75 mph)
- Target speed (freight): 80 km/h (50 mph), in rugged terrain 90 km/h (56 mph)
- Maximum train load (freight): 3,000 tonnes (3,000 long tons; 3,300 short tons) gross
- Maximum gradient: 2.55 % (1 in 39)
- Level crossings: permitted (no full grade separation)

The single-track railway line is equipped with five railway stations and one passing loop station at Adi Gudem. Each railway station can also serve as passing loop station with three lines with the exception of the passing loop station at Adi Gudem, which has only two lines. Each railway station comes without track gradient (level) except again the Adi Gudem passing loop station, which has a track gradient of 0.6% (1 in 167).

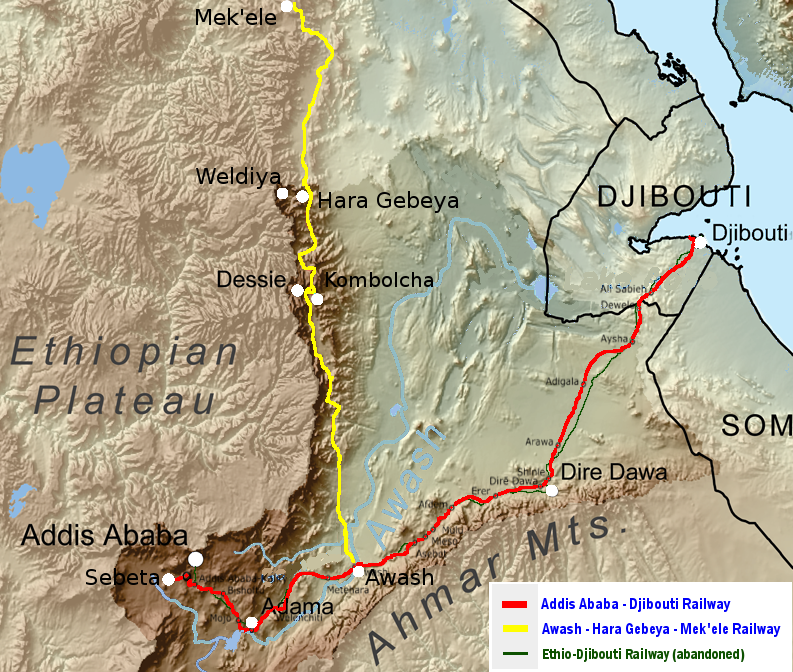
Railways in Ethiopia in 2017: Addis Ababa–Djibouti Railway Awash–Hara Gebeya (Weldiya)–Mekelle Railways Ethio–Djibouti Railway

== History ==
After the new National Railway Network of Ethiopia was considered to be constructed from 2010 on, the railway was awarded to constructors in 2012. The construction did start in February 2015. The construction starts behind the Weldiya train station but the station itself is not part of the construction, this will be done by the teams constructing the Awash–Weldiya Railway.

The 216 km Weldiya–Mekelle Railway (with a total of 241 km of rails) did not receive any known loan from foreign institutions. Given the total construction budget of US $1.5b, expected costs were US $6.2m per km of rails. The China Communications Construction Company is the prime contractor for the railway.

There were debt issues that temporarily stopped the construction works in summer 2017. The construction progress was at 46% completion at that time. In July 2017, the construction works continued.

in November 2020, the construction works on both the Weldiya–Mekelle and Awash-Weldiya sections were interrupted by the instability caused by the conflict between Ethiopia and Eritrea. In 2025 the Ethiopian Railways Corporation (ERC) tried to resume the works again.

== See also ==
- Rail transport in Ethiopia
- East African Railway Master Plan, railway network planned to be linked with this line.
- Railway stations in Ethiopia
