= Addis Ababa–Adama Expressway =

Toll road connecting Addis Ababa and Adama in Ethiopia

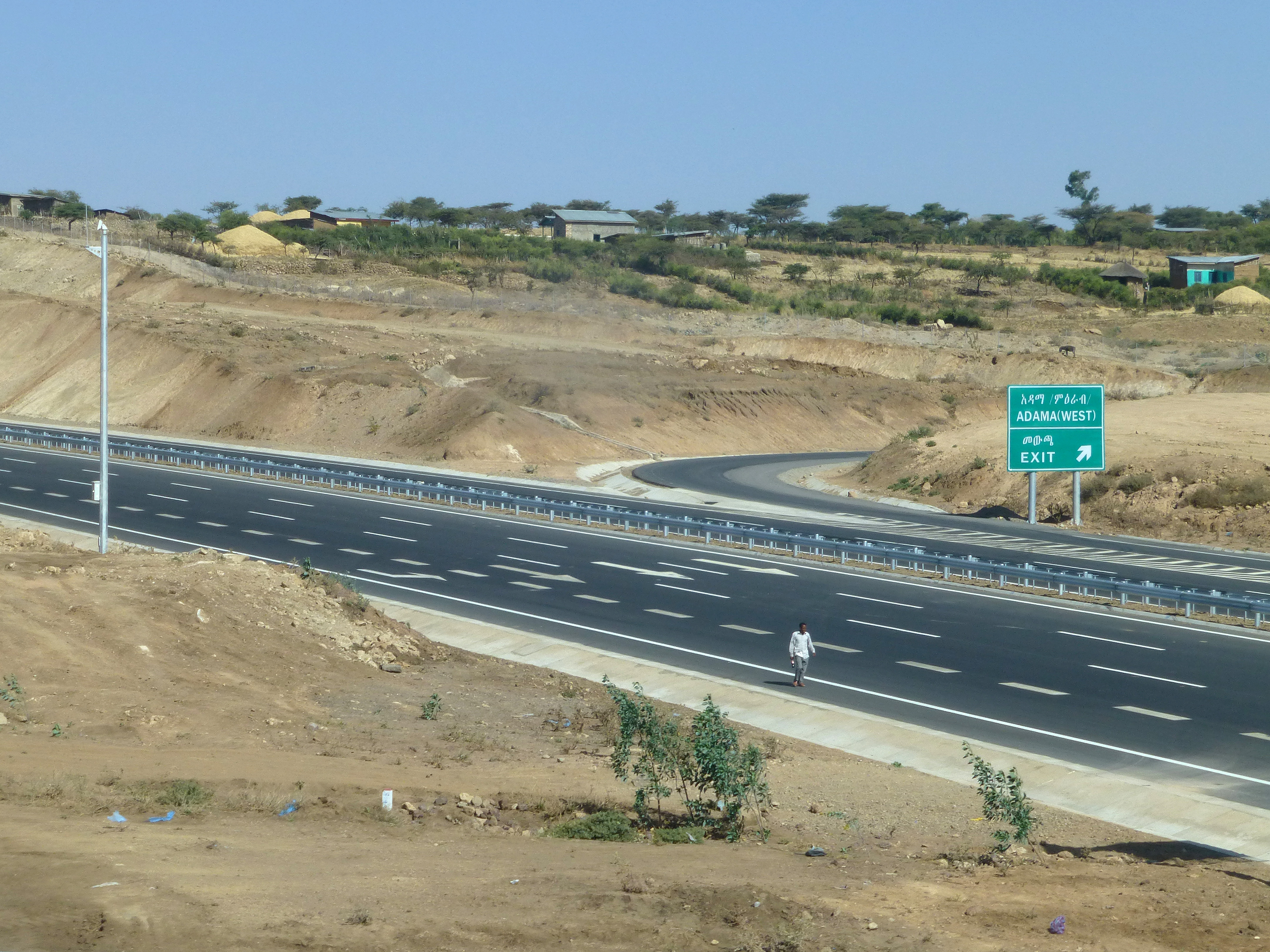

Route information
- Length: 84.7 km (52.6 mi)

Location
- Country: Ethiopia

Highway system
- Transport in Ethiopia

The Addis Ababa–Adama Expressway (Amharic: የአዲስ አበባ-አዳማ የፍጥነት መንገድ, romanized: ye’ādīsi ābeba-ādama yefit’ineti menigedi, Oromo: Daandii saffisaa Finfinnee gara Adaamaa) is a toll road that connects Addis Ababa to Adama. It is the first expressway in Ethiopia. The road was built between 2010 and 2014 by the China Communications Construction Company. The government opened the highway for traffic on September 14, 2014. The Government of Ethiopia covered 43 percent of the road's construction cost, while the remaining 57 percent was supplied by a loan from the Exim Bank of China.

The highway, with six lanes on two sides for its 84.7-kilometre (52.6 mi) length, aims to abate the heavy traffic between its two endpoints. It reduces the time required to reach Adama from Addis Ababa to 45 minutes, a reduction of more than 50 percent over the time on previously available routes.

== Junctions ==
In December 2015, construction began on the first phase of the Modjo-Hawassa Expressway. The expressway will eventually connect Addis Ababa to Awasa through a junction at Mojo. The China Railway Seventh Group is building the first 57 km, from Modjo to Meki, at a project cost of $171 million.
