= Weldiya =

Town and district in Amhara Region, Ethiopia

Weldiya ወልድያ
- Town and woreda
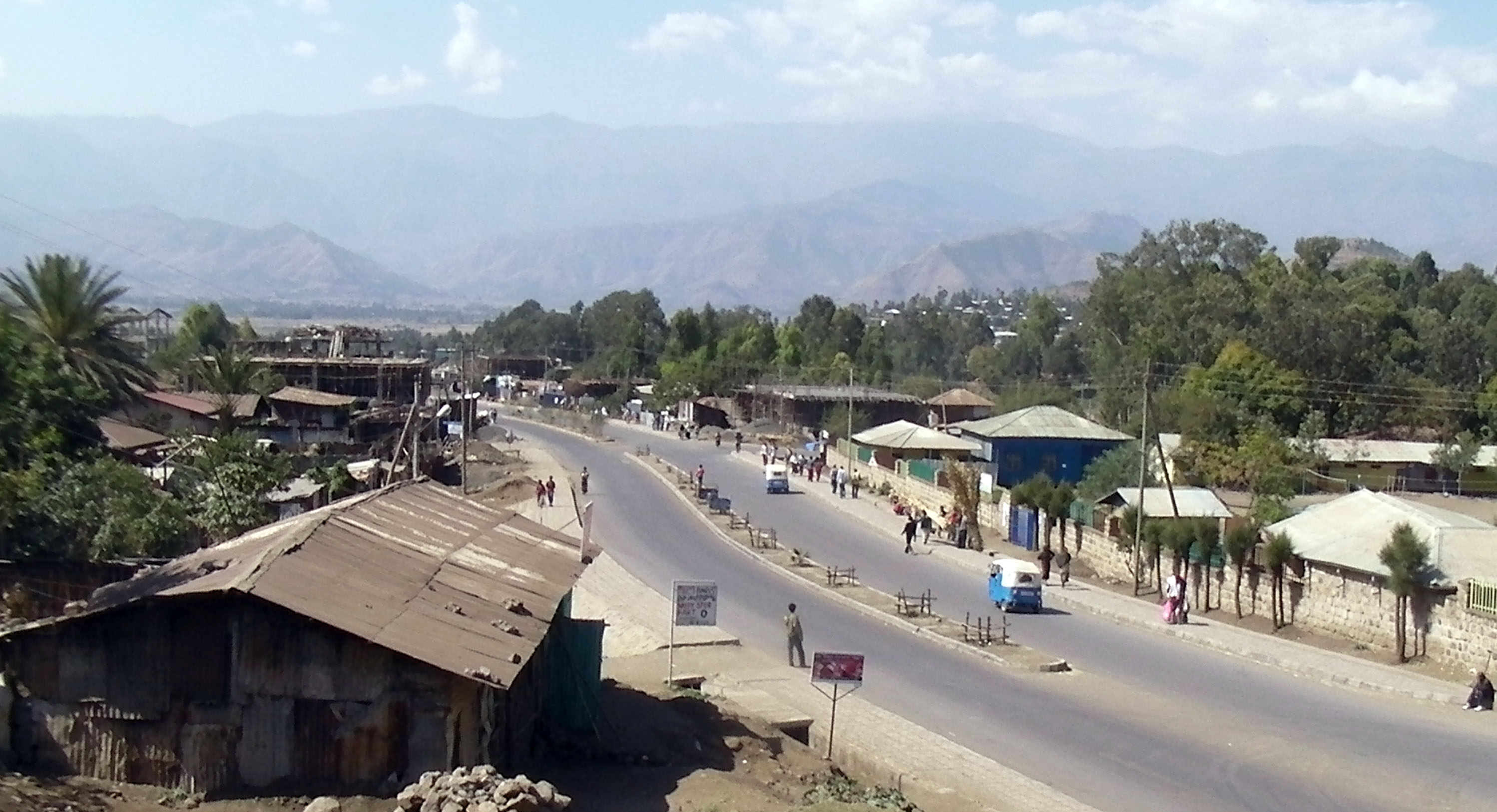
- Weldiya

- Location within Ethiopia Location within the Horn of Africa Location within Africa
- Coordinates: 11°49′50″N 39°36′0″E
- Country: Ethiopia
- Region: Amhara
- Zone: North Wollo
- Elevation: 2,112 m (6,929 ft)

Population (2007)
  - Total: 46,139
  - Estimate (2021): 98,911
- Time zone: UTC+3 (EAT)
- Climate: Csb

Weldiya or Woldia (Amharic: ወልድያ) is a town, woreda, and capital of the North Wollo Zone in the Amhara Region in northern Ethiopia. It has an elevation of 2112 meters above sea level and is surrounded by Guba Lafto woreda. Both are located north of Dessie and southeast of Lalibela.

A notable landmark is a church Weldiya Gebriel.

== History ==
=== 19th century ===
When the missionary Johann Ludwig Krapf passed through Weldiya in April 1842, it was the headquarters of Dejazmach Faris Aligas and his brother Birru. They were absent at the time of Krapf's visit, raiding the territories of Imam Liban of the Were Himano.

As early as 1890, Weldiya was the administrative center of Yejju Province. Its Tuesday market was well known for its mules.

=== 20th century ===
Weldiya was attacked in 1948 by farmers who were disgruntled after their appeals over their loss of land were ignored. They seized the prison in Weldiya and freed the prisoners. Despite this success, the revolt was eventually put down. On 16–17 November 1988 Weldiya was subjected to an aerial attack by the Derg, but no deaths were reported.

=== 21st century ===
TPLF aligned fighters captured Weldiya on 11 August 2021, but it was recaptured in December 2021.

== Demographics ==
Based on the 2007 national census conducted by the Central Statistical Agency of Ethiopia (CSA), this town had a total population of 46,139, of whom 23,000 were male and 23,139 female.

The 1994 national census reported a total population for Weldiya of 24,533 in 5,413 households, of whom 11,689 were male and 12,844 were female.

The two largest ethnic groups reported in this were the Amhara (93.92%), and the Tigrayan (4.32%); all other ethnic groups made up 1.76% of the population. Amharic was spoken as a first language by 95.2%, and 3.75% spoke Tigrinya; the remaining 1.05% spoke all other primary languages reported. 79.75% of the population practiced Ethiopian Orthodox Christianity, and 19.44% of the population said they were Muslim. By 2007 this had changed to 80.49% reporting Ethiopian Orthodox Christianity as their religion, while 18.46% of the population said they were Muslim.

Ethnic groups of Weldiya in 1994
1. Amhara (93.9%)
2. Tigrayan (4.32%)
3. Other (1.76%)

== Education ==
There is a rising university, Weldiya University, and about a dozen other governmental and private primary and secondary schools.

== Economy ==
Travertine for use in building has been worked on a minor scale nearby.

== Transportation ==
Woldia is connected by all weather roads to Addis Ababa and Mekelle by highway 2 and to Debre Tabor by highway 22.

The city will be served by two railways under construction: the Awash–Weldiya Railway and the Weldiya–Mekelle Railway, forming one line. The station won't be in Weldiya itself, but in Hara Gebeya (town about 17 km, station about 18 km east of Weldiya), which has only a third of Weldiya's number of population.

== Sports ==
The 25,155-capacity Woldia Stadium is located in Woldia. Two football clubs, Woldia City and Woldia SC, both use the venue for home games.
