= Transport in Ethiopia =

Transport in Ethiopia is overseen by the Ministry of Transport and Communications. Over the last years, the Ethiopian federal authorities have significantly increased funding for rail and road construction to build an infrastructure, that allows better economic development.

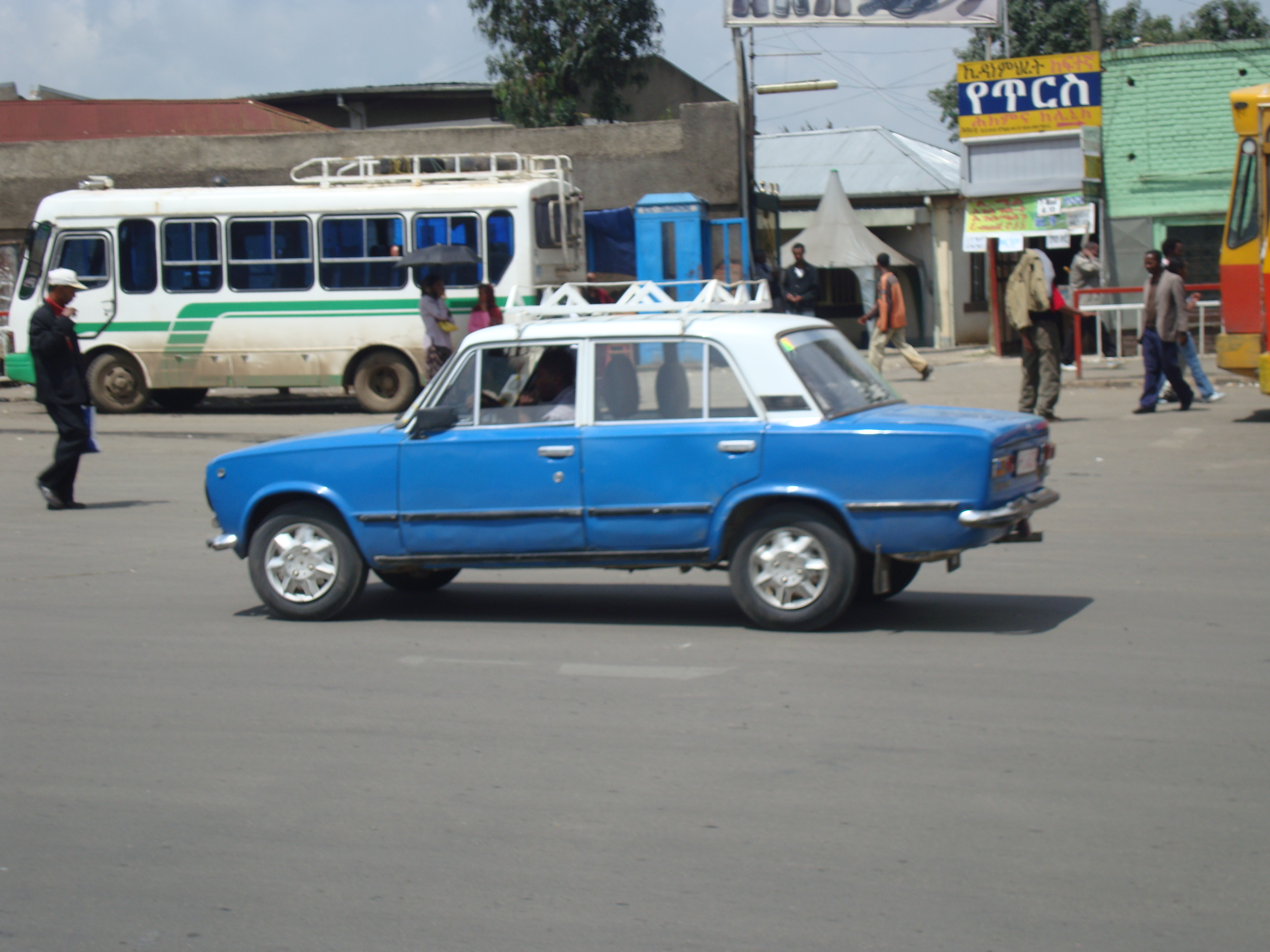
A taxi in Addis Ababa, 2008

== Railways ==
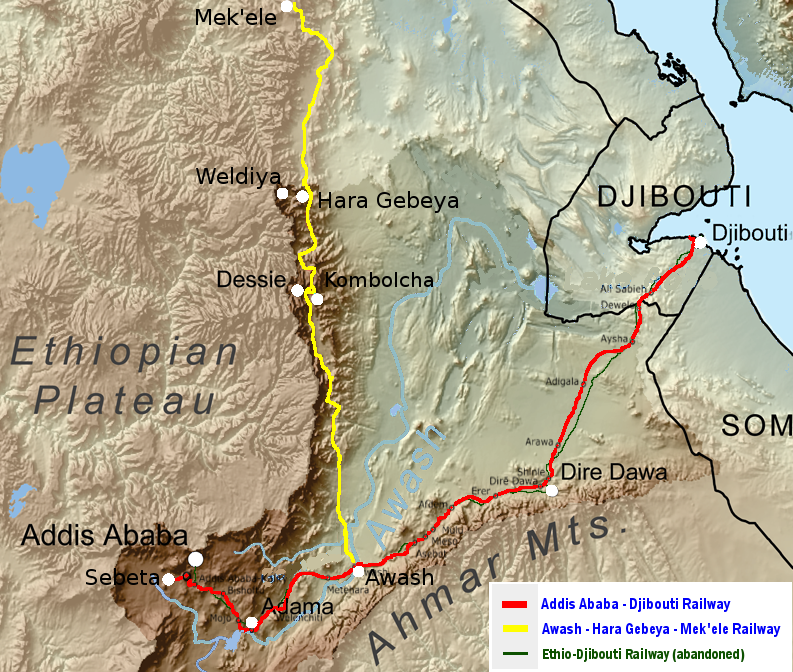
Current railways in Ethiopia: Addis Ababa–Djibouti Awash–Hara Gebeya –Mek'ele

Ethiopia is building a standard gauge railway network, the National Railway Network of Ethiopia, planned to consist of up to 6,000 km of railways in a number of years. The railway network serves a strategic goal to allow Ethiopia a sustainable and stable economic development. By 2030, the Ethiopian government hopes to invest about $65 billion into its transportation. The railway network's primary purpose is then both to connect landlocked Ethiopia to the world market by ensuring a seamless access to one or several sea ports for trade and for transporting most imports and exports. The rail transport of goods appears favorable – if compared to road transport – in terms of volume, costs, safety and speed of transportation for both imports and exports. The primary port for Ethiopia is the Port of Djibouti in Djibouti. More than 95% of Ethiopia's trade passes through Djibouti.

The port of Djibouti is served by one international railway, the electrified standard gauge 756 km long Addis Ababa – Djibouti Railway (of which 656 km run in Ethiopia). This railway has officially been opened in October 2016 but it is in trial service with no regular traffic in 2017. Once operational by the end of 2017 or in 2018, it will allow passenger transport and a travel time from Addis Ababa to Djibouti City in less than twelve hours with a designated speed of 120 km/hour.

Another railway, the Awash – Hara Gebeya Railway will go into trial service over its first 270 km in 2018. This second railway links Addis Ababa and the Addis Ababa – Djibouti Railway with the north of Ethiopia. Once operational over its first 270 km, possibly 2018 or 2019, it will allow both freight and passenger transport. A train ride from Addis Ababa to the twin cities of Kombolcha and Dessie will be possible in around six hours with a designated speed of 120 km/hour.

== Roads ==
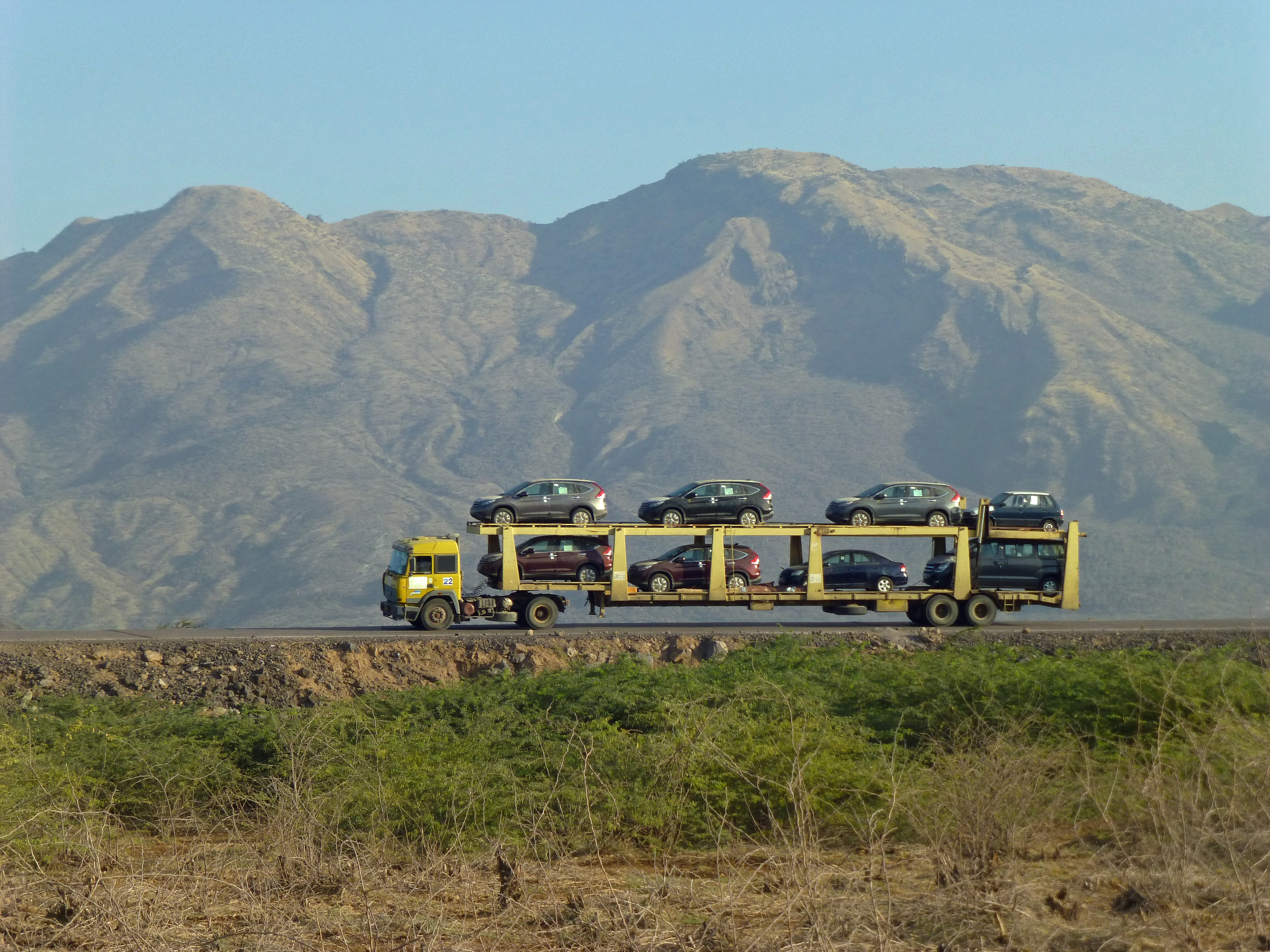
An auto transporter passes along a highway in the Lake Beseka region of central Ethiopia.

Road projects now represent around a quarter of the annual infrastructure budget of the Ethiopian federal government. Additionally, through the Road Sector Development Program (RSDP), the government has earmarked $4 billion to construct, repair and upgrade roads over the next decade.

As the first part of a 10-year to 15 year Road Sector Development Program, between 1997 and 2002 the Ethiopian government began a sustained effort to improve its infrastructure of roads. As a result, as of 2002 Ethiopia has a total (federal and regional) 33,297 km of roads, both paved and gravel. The share of federally managed roads in good quality improved from 14% in 1995 to 31% in 2002 as a result of this program, and to 89% in 2009 the road density increased from 21 km per 1000 km^{2} (in 1995) to 130.9 per 1000 km^{2} (in 2020) however, this is much greater than the average of 50 km per 1000 km^{2} for Africa.

The Ethiopian government had begun the second part of the Road Sector Development Program, which was completed in 2007. This had involved the upgrading or construction of over 7,500 km of roads, with the goal of improving the average road density for Ethiopia to 35 km per 1000 km^{2}, and reducing the proportion of the country area that is more than 5 km from an all-weather road from 75% to 70%.

In 2024, the Ministry of Transport and Communications announced that they will ban combustion engined vehicle imports. As of February 2024, the date and details of the ban have not been released.

According to the Government of Ethiopia, it has spent over 600 billion birr (US$50 billion, €30 billion) on infrastructure since 1990.

- total (regional and federal): 144,391 km (2009)
- asphalt: 120,381 km (2009) (89% of the roads in Ethiopia are asphalt)
- gravel: 11,023 km (2009) (11% of the roads in Ethiopia are gravel)
- maintained by Regional government: 86,580 km (2009)

Major roads include:
No 1: north east from Addis Ababa 853 km via Adama and Awash to Bure on Eritrean border
No 2: north from Addis Ababa 1071 km via Dessie, Mek'ele and Adigrat to Axum
No 3: north west from Addis Ababa across the Blue Nile at Dejen and again at Bahir Dar east around Lake Tana 737 km to Gondar. Designated part of the Cairo-Cape Town Trans-African Highway 4 (TAH 4)
No 4: west from Addis Ababa 445 km via Nekemte to Gimbi
No 5: west from Addis Ababa 510 km via Jimma to Metu
No 6: south west from Jimma 216 km to Mizan Teferi
No 7: south from Mojo 432 km via Shashamane and Sodo to Arba Minch. Part of road between Mojo and Shashamane is designated part of the Cairo-Cape Town Trans-African Highway 4 (TAH 4)
No 8: south from Shashamane 214 km via Awasa to Hagere Mariam. Designated part of the Cairo-Cape Town Trans-African Highway 4 (TAH 4)
No 9: south from Adama 77 km to Asella
No 10: east from Awash 572 km via Harar and Jijiga to Degehabur

=== Expressways ===
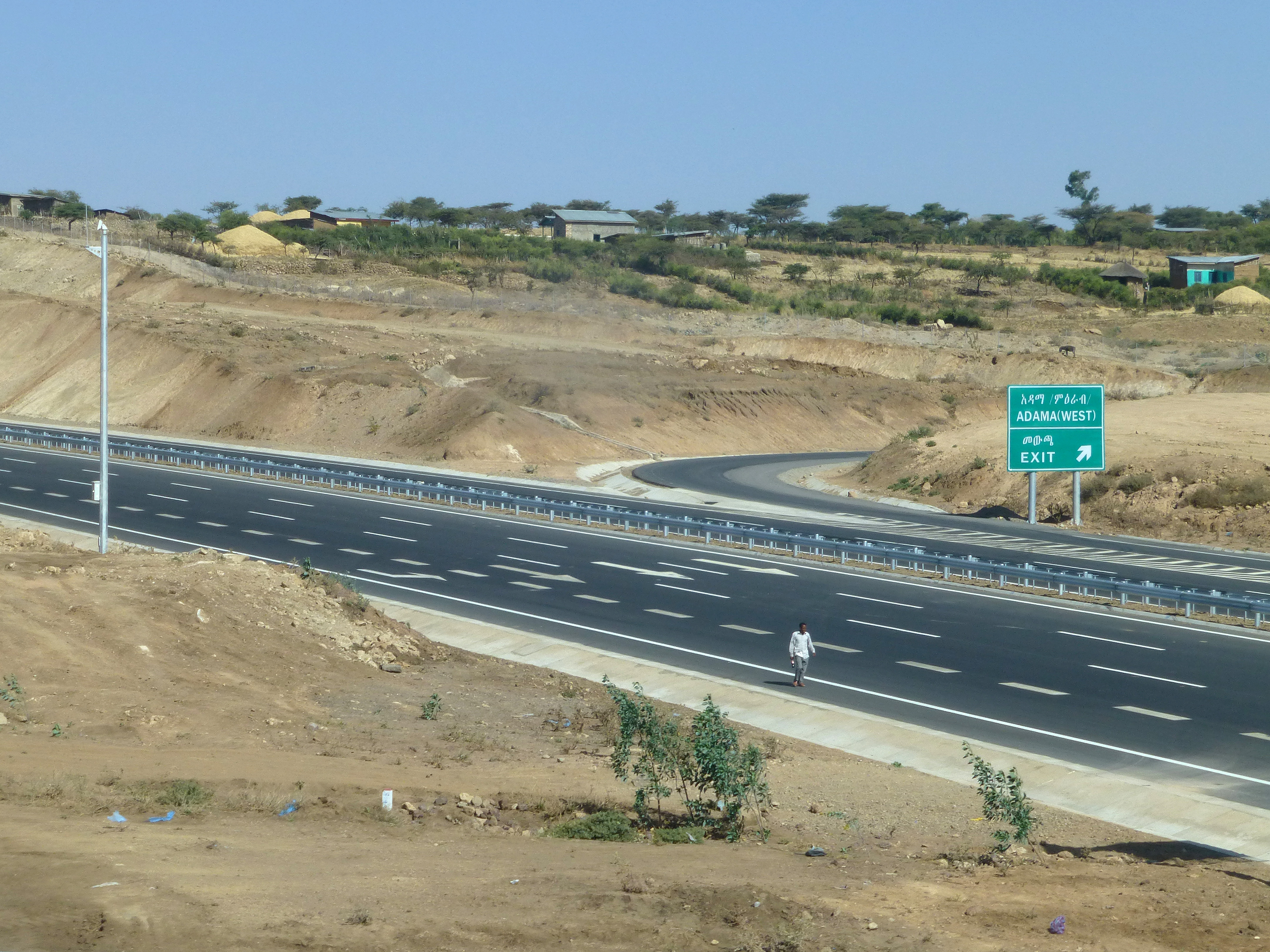
Addis Ababa–Adama Expressway at Adama

The Addis Ababa–Adama Expressway was completed in 2014 as the first expressway in Ethiopia. In December 2015, construction began on a second expressway between Awasa and Mojo, where it will connect to the existing expressway.

In addition, the Ethiopian Roads Authority (ERA) has undertaken a three-year project to upgrade over 370 km of roads in the country. Contracts have been signed with the Ethiopian Defense Construction, China Railway Engineering, Eney Construction, China Wuyi, Yotek Construction and FAL General Contractor.

=== Dangers of vehicular transport ===
It is said that Ethiopia has the highest rates of traffic fatalities per vehicle in the world. This is due to many factors. For example, the roads are poorly maintained, lightened and marked; which are major factors in road accidents. Another major factor is the people themselves, who ignore the rules of the road. Their disregard of road safety puts every other driver at risk. Due to this, foreigners are advised to keep a safe distance from the car in front of them because the driving is unpredictable; anything can happen in the blink of an eye. Even the surroundings involving transport can be incredibly dangerous. For example, there are instances when carjackings and robberies occur on highways or streets that are away from the public eye. Due to this, people are forced to be highly alert of their surroundings, such as checking to make sure no one is lurking around their vehicle before entering and avoiding nighttime travel.

== Ports and harbours ==
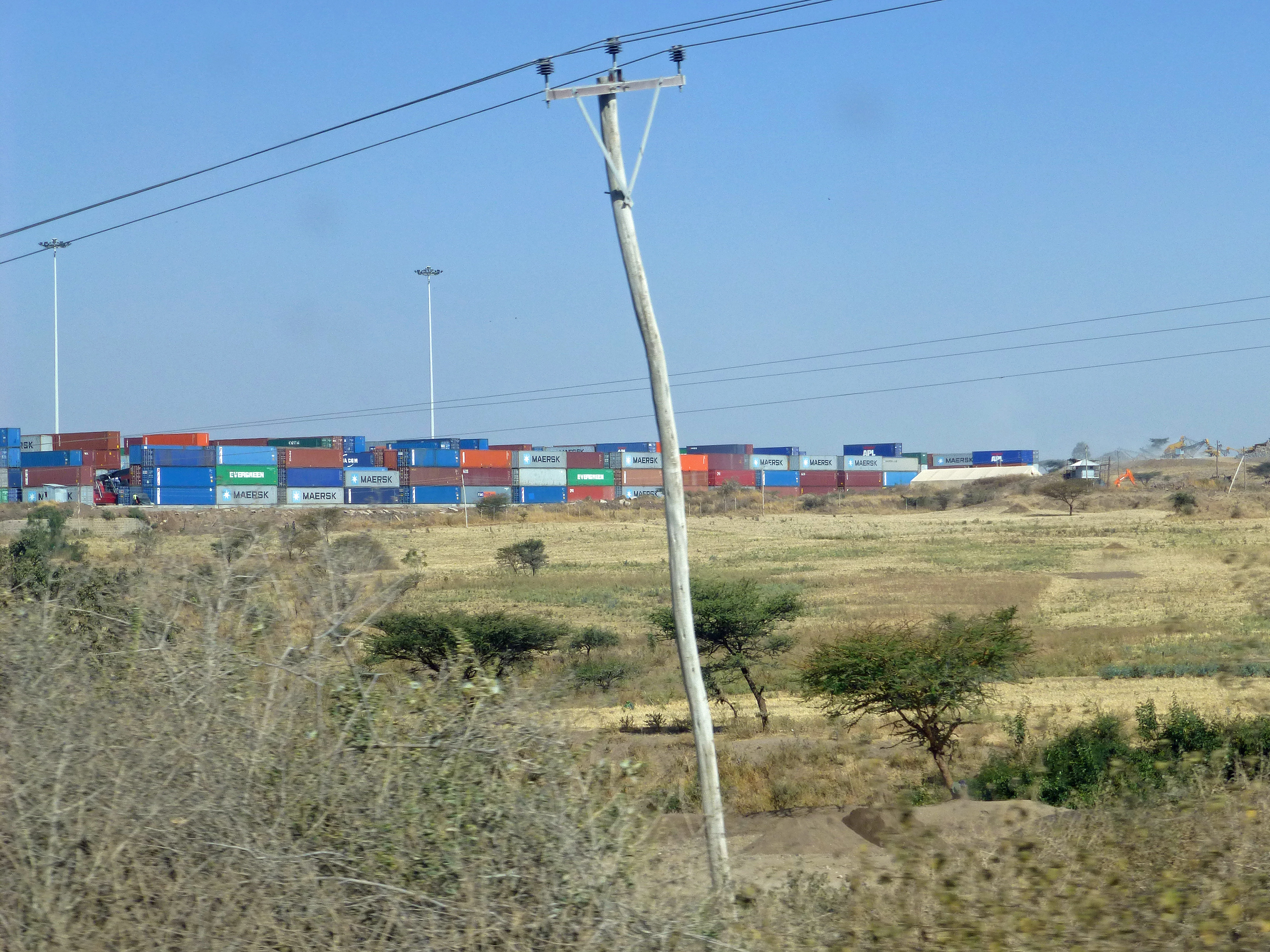
Modjo dry port

Ethiopia is landlocked and was by agreement with Eritrea using the ports of Asseb and Massawa until 1997; since the Eritrean-Ethiopian War, Ethiopia has used the port of Djibouti for nearly all of its imports. Ethiopia increasingly relies on inland dry ports for distributing cargo, after cargo arrived from Djibouti. The main Ethiopian dry port is Modjo dry port.

=== Merchant marine ===
The Baro River is the only river used for transport.

Total: 9 ships (with a volume of 1,000 GT or over) 81,933 GT/101,287 DWT (2003 est.)
ships by type: cargo ship 7; container ship 1; petroleum tanker 1; roll-on/roll-off ship 3 (1999 est.), 1 (2003 est.)

== Airports ==
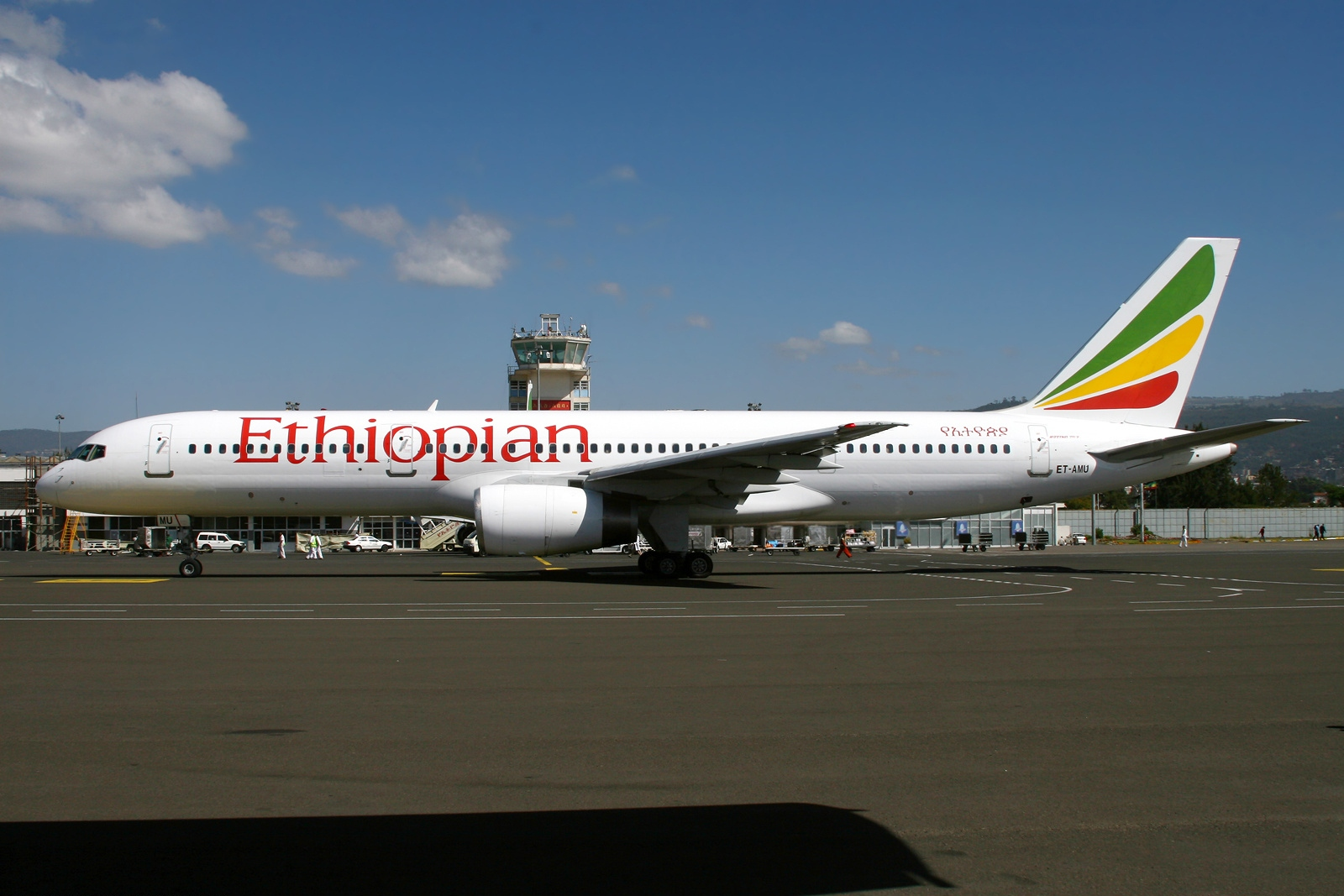
Ethiopian Airlines Boeing 757-23N at Bole International Airport, Addis Ababa (2008)

As of 2021, Ethiopia has 57 airports, of which 17 have paved runways . The Addis Ababa Airport is the largest airport in Ethiopia and one of Africa's biggest and busiest. It is the main hub of Ethiopian Airlines, the national airline that serves destinations in Ethiopia and throughout the African continent, as well as nonstop service to Asia, Europe, North America and South America. The airport is also the base of the Ethiopian Aviation Academy. As of June 2018, nearly 450 flights per day were departing from and arriving at the airport. In 2018, about 12 million passengers were carried on domestic and international flights.

Paved runways

total: 14
over 3,047 m: 3
2,438 to 3,047 m: 5
1,524 to 2,437 m: 5
914 to 1,523 m: 1 (2003 est.)

Unpaved runways

total: 68
over 3,047 m: 3
2,438 to 3,047 m: 2
1,524 to 2,437 m: 13
914 to 1,523 m: 27
under 914 m: 23 (2003 est.)

== See also ==
- Road traffic accident in Ethiopia
- List of airports in Ethiopia
- Ridesharing companies of Ethiopia
