= Kombolcha =

Town in Amhara Region, Ethiopia

Kombolcha ኮምቦልቻ
- City
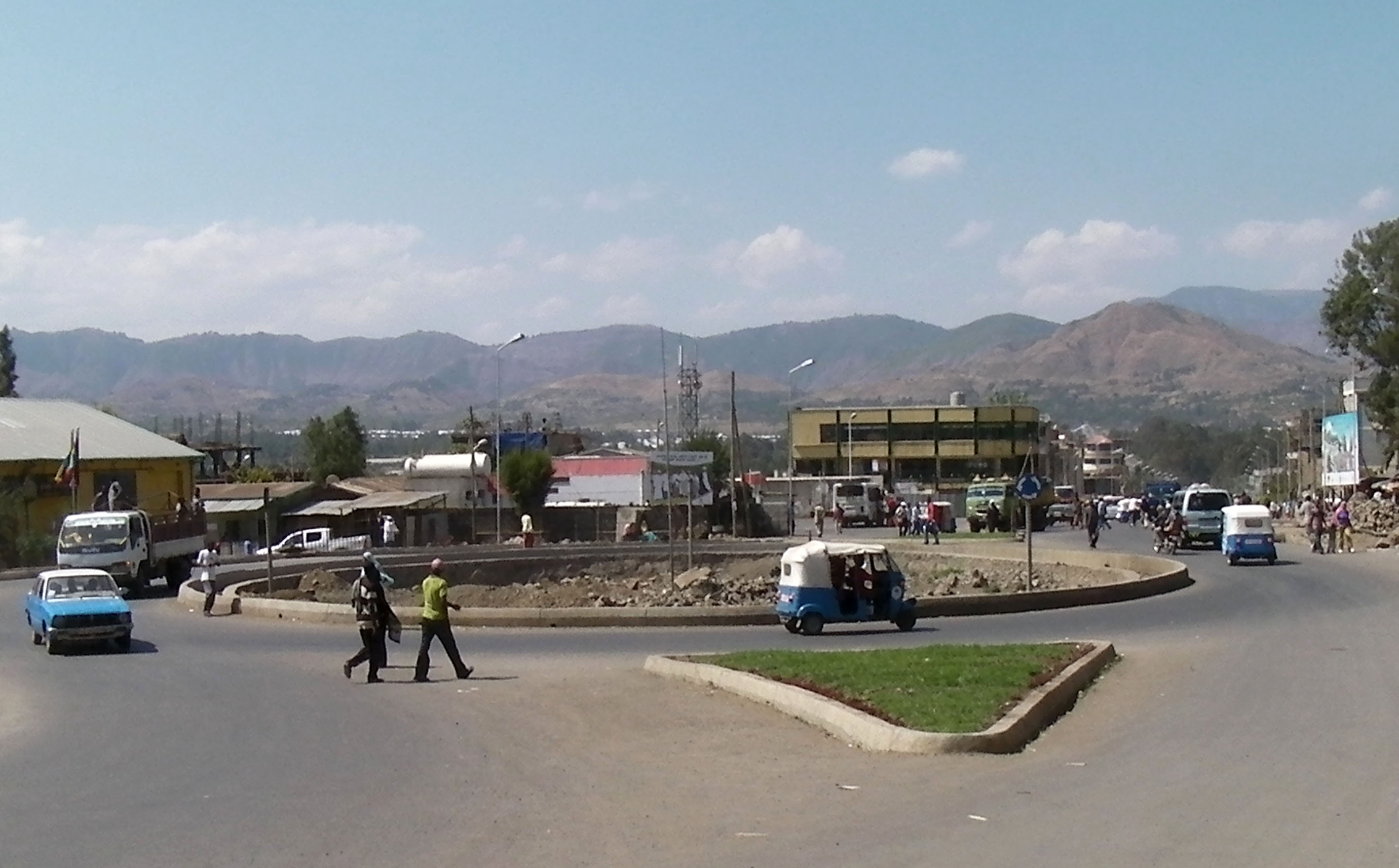

- Location within Ethiopia Location within the Horn of Africa Location within Africa
- Coordinates: 11°5′12″N 39°44′12″E
- Country: Ethiopia
- Region: Amhara
- Zone: South Wollo
- Elevation: 1,842 m (6,043 ft)

Population (2007)
  - Total: 85,367
  - Estimate (2021): 125,654
- Time zone: UTC+3 (EAT)

Kombolcha (Amharic: ኮምቦልቻ) is a town and district in north-central Ethiopia. Located in the Debub Wollo Zone of the Amhara Region, it has a latitude and longitude of 11°5′N 39°44′E with an elevation between 1842 and 1915 meters above sea level. Some guide books describe Kombolcha as the twin town of Dessie which lies some 12 kilometres (7.5 mi) to the northwest.

== History ==
=== Origins ===
Tadesse Tamrat records that archeologists discovered "some remains of Christian settlements", dated to the late first millennium of the current era.

=== 19th century ===
When the missionary Johann Ludwig Krapf was led as a prisoner from Adare Bille's capital to the Teledere House in April 1843 he had passed through Kombolcha, which he described as a village near the source of the Borkana River.

=== 20th century ===
Kombolcha was described during the Italian occupation as having postal and telephone service, a clinic, a general store, a barrack village of the A.A.S.S., as well as other improvements intended for Italians.

The city was used as a base by the United Nations relief organization and other humanitarian groups during the 1984 famine. On 19 November 1989 the Tigrayan People's Liberation Front (TPLF) claimed to have captured Kombolcha. However, the highway from Kombolcha to Assab was not fully brought under TPLF control until the Derg was expelled from Tigray later that year.

=== 21st century ===
An accord was signed between Ethiopia Bazra Motors and Russian company Ulyanovsk Automobile Plant on 30 April 2021, to set up a UAZ cars assembly plant.

During the Tigray War, Tigrayan forces said they had captured the town on 31 October 2021. The Ethiopian government accused the Tigrayan forces of killing 100 youth in the town on 1 November 2021, Tigrayan forces denied the claim. The Ethiopian Government claimed that the TPLF had "ransacked and destroyed Kombolcha's infrastructure" after its capture. Al Jazeera and BBC reported that WFP suspended food distribution in Dessie and Kombolcha due this mass looting of the supplies. Most of the construction equipment of the Awash–Weldiya Railway project was looted or destroyed, and part of the infrastructure of the almost-finished railway, such as tunnels and bridges, was damaged. The disruption has thrown several thousand railway workers out of work.

By 6 December 2021, the Ethiopian government announced that Dessie and Kombolcha had been liberated from the TPLF aligned fighters. As of July 2022 the railway construction site was used instead as a camp for internally displaced persons.

== Demographics ==
Based on the 2007 national census conducted by the Central Statistical Agency of Ethiopia (CSA), Kombolcha woreda had a total population of 85,367, of whom 41,968 were male and 43,399 female; 58,667 or 68.72% were urban inhabitants living in town of Kombolcha, the rest of population was living in rural kebeles around Kombolcha. The majority of the inhabitants were Muslim, with 73.92% reporting that as their religion, while 23.44% of the population said they practiced Ethiopian Orthodox Christianity and 2.32% were Protestants.

The 1994 national census reported a total population for Kombolcha of 39,466 in 8,643 households, of whom 18,995 were male and 20,471 were female. The three largest ethnic groups reported in this town were the Amhara (91.34%), Tigrayan (5.85%), and the Oromo (1.29%); all other ethnic groups made up 1.52% of the population. Amharic was spoken as a first language by 93.02%, 5.2% Tigrinya, and 1.11% spoke Oromiffa; the remaining 0.67% spoke all other primary languages reported. The majority of the inhabitants were Muslim, with 57.42% of the population having reported they practiced that belief, while 41.71% of the population said they professed Ethiopian Orthodox Christianity.

Ethnic groups of Kombolcha in 1994
1. Amhara (91.3%)
2. Tigrayan (5.85%)
3. Oromo (1.29%)
4. Other (1.52%)

== Climate ==
Climate data for Kombolcha (extremes 1908–present)
Month	Jan	Feb	Mar	Apr	May	Jun	Jul	Aug	Sep	Oct	Nov	Dec	Year
Record high °C (°F)	32.3 (90.1)	32.9 (91.2)	32.3 (90.1)	32.5 (90.5)	35.2 (95.4)	34.5 (94.1)	35.2 (95.4)	32.4 (90.3)	32.3 (90.1)	29.4 (84.9)	30.7 (87.3)	29.0 (84.2)	35.2 (95.4)
Mean daily maximum °C (°F)	23.9 (75.0)	24.6 (76.3)	25.4 (77.7)	26.6 (79.9)	28.2 (82.8)	29.9 (85.8)	27.5 (81.5)	26.1 (79.0)	25.4 (77.7)	24.6 (76.3)	24.0 (75.2)	23.4 (74.1)	25.8 (78.4)
Daily mean °C (°F)	17.2 (63.0)	18.4 (65.1)	19.7 (67.5)	20.4 (68.7)	21.7 (71.1)	23.3 (73.9)	21.6 (70.9)	20.6 (69.1)	19.9 (67.8)	18.4 (65.1)	17.1 (62.8)	16.6 (61.9)	19.6 (67.3)
Mean daily minimum °C (°F)	9.4 (48.9)	10.5 (50.9)	11.8 (53.2)	12.6 (54.7)	12.6 (54.7)	13.7 (56.7)	13.3 (55.9)	12.9 (55.2)	12.4 (54.3)	9.8 (49.6)	8.1 (46.6)	8.4 (47.1)	11.3 (52.3)
Record low °C (°F)	0.2 (32.4)	1.1 (34.0)	2.8 (37.0)	5.4 (41.7)	5.0 (41.0)	5.1 (41.2)	4.5 (40.1)	4.5 (40.1)	2.0 (35.6)	0.3 (32.5)	0.2 (32.4)	0.0 (32.0)	0.0 (32.0)
Average rainfall mm (inches)	29 (1.1)	39 (1.5)	80 (3.1)	89 (3.5)	64 (2.5)	32 (1.3)	253 (10.0)	246 (9.7)	122 (4.8)	32 (1.3)	20 (0.8)	19 (0.7)	1,027 (40.4)
Average rainy days (≥ 1.0 mm)	3	5	9	9	8	4	20	21	14	4	2	2	101
Average relative humidity (%)	58	56	62	58	46	35	56	64	62	61	56	57	56
Source 1: Deutscher Wetterdienst
Source 2: Meteo Climat (record highs and lows)

== Economy ==
=== Transportation ===
Kombolcha is connected with Dessie through Ethiopian Highway 2. This city shares Kombolcha Airport with neighboring Dessie. A station on the Awash–Weldiya Railway is under construction. In 2013 a dry port was established near the city with handling capacity for 1888 TEU containers at a time. The dry port is owned and operated by the Ethiopian Shipping and Logistics Services Authority.

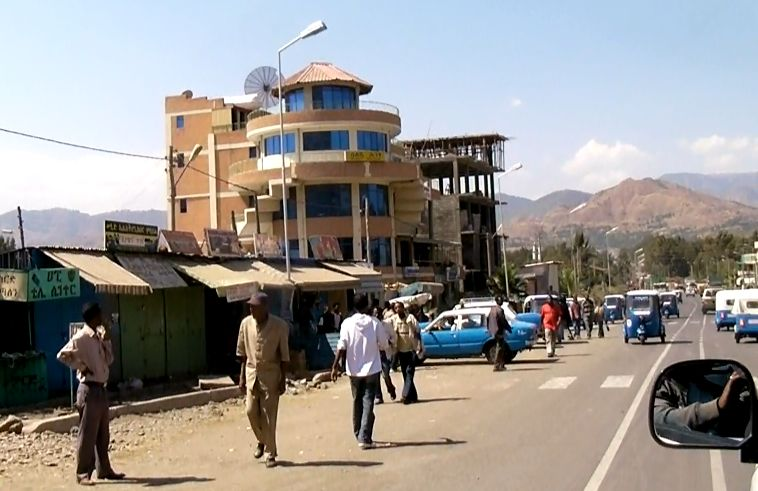
Looking west in the town centre

=== Industry ===
Kombolcha is also home to Kombolcha Steel products, a metalworking factory that is part of MIDROC, a conglomerate owned by businessman Sheikh Mohammed Al Amoudi. Another industry in this town is the Kombolcha Textile Factory (KTF), which announced 9 March 2009 that it was beginning a 190 million Birr modernization project to improve the quality of its projects. At the time of the announcement, the KTF exported its goods to Italy, Sweden, Belgium, and China.

The $90 million Kombolcha Industrial Park was inaugurated by Prime Minister Hailemariam Desalegn and has attracted investors from the US, South Korea, China, and Italy. Located just east of the airport, Kombolcha Industrial Park houses nine total factory sheds, eight of which are currently rented out. The industrial park produces stretching fabrics which are exported to Italy, and socks that are exported to Canada, Malaysia, Germany, and the US. Kombolcha Industrial Park also produces men's suits that are exported to the US, as well as female hand bags which are exported to the US, Japan, and the Netherlands.

== Education ==
Wollo University and Kombolcha Institute of Technology offer courses at the undergraduate and graduate levels.
