= Kombolcha Airport =

Airport in Kombolcha, Amhara Region, Ethiopia

Kombolcha Airport Dessie
- IATA: DSE; ICAO: HADC

Summary
- Airport type: Public
- Owner: Ethiopian Civil Aviation Authority
- Operator: Ethiopian Airports Enterprise
- Serves: Kombolcha, Dessie
- Elevation AMSL: 6,120 ft / 1,865 m
- Coordinates: 11°06′40″N 39°43′30″E

Map
- Location of the airport in Ethiopia

Runways
Direction	Length		Surface
Direction	ft	m	Surface
17/35	6,560	2,000	Asphalt
- Source: Google Maps

Kombolcha Airport (IATA: DSE, ICAO: HADC) is a public airport serving the towns of Kombolcha and Dessie in Ethiopia. Construction began in 2010. It replaces the now closed Kombolcha dirt runway airport at 11°4'57"N 39°42'41"E.

== Airlines and destinations ==
Airlines	Destinations
Ethiopian Airlines	Addis Ababa
