= Ethiopian Railways Corporation =

National railway operator of Ethiopia

- Company type: State-owned enterprise
- Industry: Rail Transport
- Founded: 2007; 19 years ago
- Headquarters: Addis Ababa, Ethiopia
- Area served: Ethiopia
- Services: Passenger rail Freight rail
- Net income: ▼ -9.7 billion birr
- Divisions: Railway operations
- Website: www.erc.gov.et

Ethiopian Railways, commonly known as ER, full name Ethiopian Railways Corporation, is the national railway operator of the Federal Democratic Republic of Ethiopia, under the regulation of the Ministry of Transport. ER operates passenger and freight transport. Founded on 28 November 2007 (regulation 141/2007) as a quasi-public corporation to operate Ethiopia's passenger and freight rail services, mainly the Addis Ababa–Djibouti Railway, it receives federal subsidies but is managed as a for-profit organization. ERC's headquarters is located in Addis Ababa.

The corporation is building a railway school in Bishoftu in partnership with the Chinese government at a cost of 1.57 billion birr.
