= Dessie =

Town in Amhara Region, Ethiopia

Dessie ደሴ (Amharic)
- City
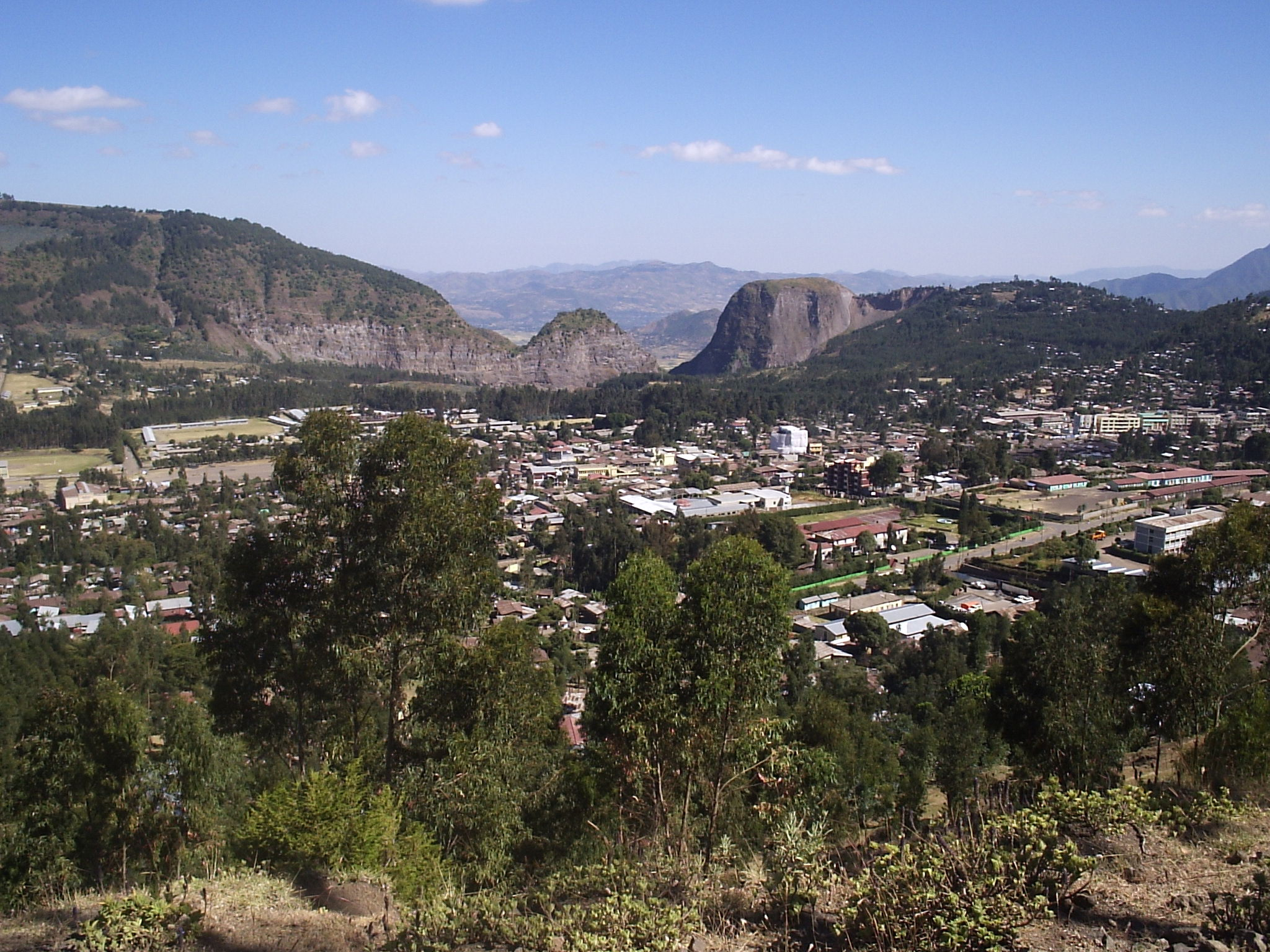
- Dessie City View

- Location within Ethiopia Location within the Horn of Africa Location within Africa
- Coordinates: 11°8′N 39°38′E
- Country: Ethiopia
- Region: Amhara
- Zone: South Wollo
- Founded: 1882
- Founder: Yohannes IV

Government
  - Mayor: Samuel Mollalene

Area
  - Total: 168 km^{2} (65 sq mi)
- Elevation: 2,470 m (8,100 ft)

Population (2007)
  - Total: 151,174
  - Estimate (2021): 257,126
  - Density: 900/km^{2} (2,330/sq mi)
- Time zone: UTC+3 (EAT)
- Area code: 33

Dessie (Amharic: ደሴ, romanized: Däse; also spelled Dese or Dessye) is a town in north-central Ethiopia. Located in the South Wollo Zone of the Amhara Region, it sits at a latitude and longitude of 11°8′N 39°38′E, with an elevation between 2,470 and 2,550 metres above sea level. Dessie is 400 km to the north of the capital Addis Ababa. It has a population of more than 200,000 people in over 30 wards.

== History ==
=== Medieval history ===
Prior to Dessie's foundation, the major settlement in this area was Wasal, mentioned in an early 16th-century Italian itinerary.

=== 19th century ===
Dessie was founded by Emperor Yohannes IV who was camping in the highlands to the west of the Chefa Valley in 1882 on an expedition to forcefully convert the Muslims who lived in the region to Christianity. As he was looking for a place to centralize his power in Wollo, he stayed overnight in a pre-existing town that is now contained within Dessie. While there, he spotted a comet. He was so impressed by the sight of it that he interpreted it to be a sign from heaven to found his capital city there. A similar story to Zara Yaqob's founding of his capital, Debre Birhan. Thus, he named it Dessie (Amharic: "My Joy"), as a reference to the elation that the comet had made him feel.

Though founded and named by Yohannes, Dessie was beyond his dominions, for already in 1878 he recognized Wollo as being under the jurisdiction of Menelik II. Menelik's writ in the province, however, was weak and in 1888 handed its governorship to Ras Mikael. In 1892, Ras Mikael married the daughter of Menelik in the town, thus further integrating Wollo and Shewa. The strategic importance of Dessie became apparent during the First Italo-Ethiopian War, when the Emperor and his forces passed through the town on their way to and from Tigray.

=== 20th century ===
Dessie's location led to the telegraph line constructed between 1902 and 1904 from Asmara south to Addis Ababa, passing through the city, and giving it a local telegraph office. Also in 1904, the Italian Giuseppe Bonaiuti took part in constructing a fair-weather road connecting the city to Addis Ababa.

Dessie increased in importance when Ras Mikael, son-in-law to Emperor Menelik II, made it his base. The city was where his son, would-be emperor Lij Iyasus, crowned Mikael negus around 1915. During his residence in Dessie, the Negus built a palace and the church Enda Medhane Alem. The church is decorated with paintings which include portraits of Ras Mikael and his son.

After the defeat of his father Negus Mikael, Lij Iyasu took refuge in Dessie beginning on 8 November 1916 while unsuccessfully seeking support from Ras Wolde Giyorgis and other major nobles of northern Ethiopia. However, Ras Wolde Giyorgis used these overtures to extract concessions from the central government, then marched on Dessie which Lij Iyasu fled 10 December.

During the Italian invasion, Dessie was first bombed 6 December 1935; the American Hospital was one of the buildings damaged in the attack. Emperor Haile Selassie was photographed personally machine-gunning the raiding planes. The city was occupied by the Italians 15 April 1936.

Dessie became an important administrative center under the Italian occupation, and the Franciscans established, in 1937, the Latin Catholic missionary Apostolic Prefecture of Dessié, which would be suppressed in 1957 after its only prefect's death.

The Italian garrison of the city surrendered 26 April 1941 to Brigadier Pienaar's 1st South African Brigade and 500 Ethiopian arbegnoch, and after the Second World War, the town continued in importance as the capital of the province of Wollo until the province's abolition in 1995.

In a decree of 1942, Dessie is listed as one of only six "Schedule A" municipalities in Ethiopia, while there were about a hundred in "Schedule B".In 1955, a public address system was installed in the central square which was used to re-broadcast announcements on Radio Addis Ababa to the public. In 1957, Dessie had one of 9 provincial secondary schools (excluding Eritrea) in Ethiopia, named after Woizero Sehine the daughter of Negus Mikael.

In February 1973, a crowd of 1,500 peasants marched from Dessie to the capital to make the authorities notice the famine in Wollo. They were stopped by police on the outskirts of Addis Ababa and forced to return. Following the 1974 Ethiopian revolution, one of the few major encounters between rebels and government forces took place north-west of Dessie in October 1976. Instigated by the local landlord, a large group of peasants marched on the city; troops of the Derg fired into the crowd. Reports of the death toll vary widely, from several hundred to nearly a thousand. During the final phase of the Ethiopian Civil War, the EPRDF took permanent control of the city on 18 May 1990, as part of Operation Wallelign.

=== 21st century ===
On 30 October 2021 it was reported that Dessie fell to TPLF aligned forces. On December 6, 2021, the Ethiopian government announced that Dessie and Kombolcha had been retaken from the rebel fighters.

== Demographics ==
Based on the 2007 national census conducted by the Central Statistical Agency of Ethiopia (CSA), Dessie woreda had a total population of 151,174, of whom 72,932 were men and 78,242 were women; 120,095 people or 79.44% were urban inhabitants living in the town of Dessie, while the rest of the population (31,079 people) were in the rural kebeles around Dessie. For religion, 58.62% of inhabitants indicated Islam, 39.92% indicated Ethiopian Orthodox Christianity.

The 1994 national census reported a total population for Dessie of 97,314 in 20,628 households residing in 17,426 housing units, of whom 45,337 were men and 51,977 were women. The two largest ethnic groups reported in this town were the Amhara (92.83%), and the Tigrayan (4.49%); all other ethnic groups made up 2.68% of the population. Amharic was spoken as a first language by 94.89%, and 3.79% spoke Tigrinya; the remaining 0.67% spoke all other primary languages reported. For religion, 60.42% of inhabitants indicated Ethiopian Orthodox Christianity, and 38.5% indicated Islam.

Ethnic groups of Dessie in 1994
1. Amhara (92.8%)
2. Tigrayan (4.49%)
3. Other (2.68%)

== Climate ==
Dessie is located at an altitude of 2,470 metres (8,100 ft) above sea level in low-shrouded mountains and hills. Dessie has a subtropical highland climate (Cwb) bordering on a humid subtropical climate (Cwa).

Climate data for Dessie, elevation 2,540 m (8,330 ft)
Month	Jan	Feb	Mar	Apr	May	Jun	Jul	Aug	Sep	Oct	Nov	Dec	Year
Average precipitation mm (inches)	22.0 (0.87)	40.0 (1.57)	81.0 (3.19)	93.0 (3.66)	73.0 (2.87)	43.0 (1.69)	271.0 (10.67)	279.0 (10.98)	150.0 (5.91)	47.0 (1.85)	18.0 (0.71)	22.0 (0.87)	1,139 (44.84)
Average relative humidity (%)	62	61	59	59	48	41	60	64	64	60	59	60	58
Source: FAO

== Economy ==
Dessie is located along Ethiopian Highway 2. It has postal service (a post office was established in the 1920s), and telephone service from at least as early as 1954. The city has had electrical power since at least 1963 when a new diesel-powered electric power station with a power line to Kombolcha was completed, at a cost of Eth$ 110,000. Intercity bus service is provided by the Selam Bus Line Share Company. Dessie shares Combolcha Airport (ICAO code HADC, IATA DSE) with neighbouring Kombolcha.

== Cityscape ==
Dessie is home to a museum, in the former home of Dejazmach Yoseph Birru. It also has a zawiya of the Qadiriyya order of Islam, which was the first Sufi order to be introduced into north-east Africa.

== Culture ==
Dessie is a part of the Wello region, thus having a similar style of cultural clothing, music, and dances to other cities in the former Wollo Province. Men's traditional clothing is, mostly, similar to the rest of the Amhara region's. Women's traditional clothing includes a habesha kemis, which is a dress, as well as a matching scarf, sometimes two, one tied around the waist and the other over the hair.

== Partnerships ==
Dessie cooperates with:

- Ijevan, Armenia (2022)

== Notable locals ==
- Mohammed Al Amoudi, Saudi businessman who has been one of the world's richest people of African or Saudi descent
