= Awash, Ethiopia =

Market town in Afar Region, Ethiopia

Awash Subah አዋሽ
- City
- Awash Subah Kilo
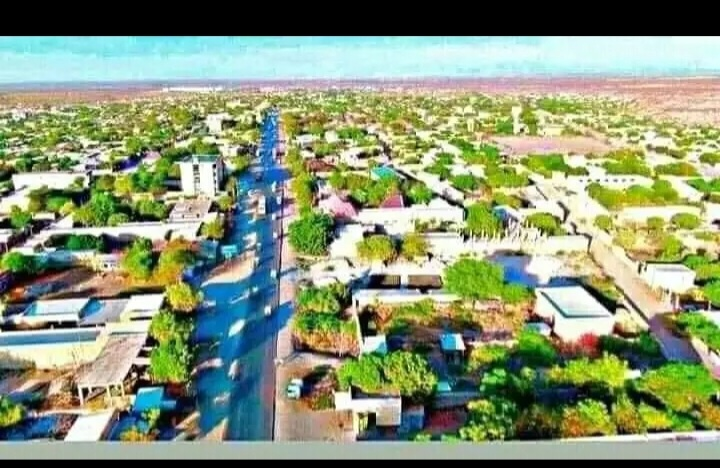
- Awash City Administration is fast growing City in Afar Region

- Location within Ethiopia Location within the Horn of Africa Location within Africa
- Coordinates: 8°59′N 40°10′E
- Country: Ethiopia
- Region: Afar Region
- Zone: Administrative Zone 3 (Afar)

Government
  - Type: Town Administration
  - Mayor: Abdo Ali Mohammed (Assigned Currently)
- Elevation: 986 m (3,235 ft)

Population (2005)
  - Total: 11,053 (est)
- Climate: BSh

Awash Subah is a market town in central Ethiopia. Located in Administrative Zone 3 of the Afar Region, above a gorge on the Awash River, after which the town is named, (Note: Philip Briggs praises this gorge, noting "the drama of which is accentuated by a row of low volcanic hills above the opposite cliff.) the town lies on the Addis Ababa–Djibouti Railway, which crosses the gorge by a bridge there. It is the largest settlement in Awash Fentale woreda.

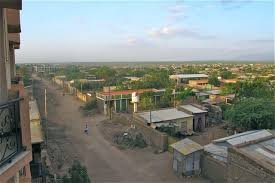
Awash lies outside the Awash National Park, which is known for its wildlife, for the Mount Fentale caldera and for the Filwoha Hot Springs. Its market is held on Mondays, where Afar and Kereyu crafts can be found.

== History ==
An iron bridge over the Awash had been built at the present location of Awash by Emperor Menelik II's favorite, Alfred Ilg, around 1890; this bridge replaced an earlier wooden one. The construction had to face the great difficulty of transporting the girders from Djibouti, but once the material had arrived, the structure had been finished in ten days; however Emperor Menelik had used for other purposes the cement imported from Europe to build the bridge with. When Count Gleichen encountered the bridge in 1897, during his mission to Emperor Menelik, he found "the bridge would be too weak to stand anything but ordinary pack-animal traffic. For nine months in the year it is blocked at each end by a broad abattis of thorn-bush, - to prevent people from using it when the river is fordable, - but during the rains it is left open."

Awash grew up around the railroad station, which was opened not long after 1917 when the railway had reached this far into Ethiopia. A hotel for passengers was built in Awash about that time. The fourth post office in Ethiopia (after Harar, Dire Dawa and Addis Ababa) was established in Awash on 1 September 1923, but it may not have been much of a point of origin and arrival but rather a place on the line between the capital and the coast.

During the Italian occupation, Awash still provided a post office, a telegraph station, the hotel, and restaurant. The town was occupied in April 1941 by the 22nd East African Brigade of the King's African Rifles, who had advanced for three days from Dire Dawa. Elements of this brigade afterwards continued their advance across the Awash at this point on 3 April 1941, although the road and rail bridge had been demolished by the retreating Italians. By 1953, the bridge had been rebuilt.

One of the five camps to train conscripts of the People's Militia (reconstituted in the spring of 1977 as the "Red Army") was located at Awash.

=== Rail disaster ===
On January 13, 1985, a train derailed at Awash on the Ethio-Djibouti Railways plunging four of its five carriages into a ravine; the crash was estimated to have killed at least 428 and injured 500 of the estimated 1,000 on board. It was the worst rail accident in African history. It is believed that the cause of the crash was the excessive speed of the train round a curve on a bridge across the ravine. The derailment happened at 13:40 between Arba and Awash.

=== Earthquake ===
On January 2, 2025 an earthquake with a magnitude of 5.8 struck the region. The vibration from the quake was felt in nearby towns such as Awash Sebat Kilo and Awash Arba, Seismic upheaval in the Awash area has uprooted thousands from their homes.

== Demographics ==
Based on figures from the Central Statistical Agency in 2005, Awash has an estimated total population of 11,053, of whom 5,748 are men and 5,305 were women. (Note: Note that the town is called Awash Sebat Kilo in the CSA report of 2005.) According to the 1994 national census, the town had a population of 8,684.

== Climate ==
Climate data for Awash, elevation 1,052 m (3,451 ft)
Month	Jan	Feb	Mar	Apr	May	Jun	Jul	Aug	Sep	Oct	Nov	Dec	Year
Mean daily maximum °C (°F)	30.7 (87.3)	31.7 (89.1)	33.5 (92.3)	34.0 (93.2)	36.0 (96.8)	36.5 (97.7)	33.4 (92.1)	32.2 (90.0)	33.5 (92.3)	33.5 (92.3)	31.7 (89.1)	30.6 (87.1)	33.1 (91.6)
Daily mean °C (°F)	23.8 (74.8)	25.0 (77.0)	26.8 (80.2)	27.6 (81.7)	29.7 (85.5)	29.2 (84.6)	26.3 (79.3)	25.8 (78.4)	27.6 (81.7)	27.8 (82.0)	25.7 (78.3)	24.7 (76.5)	26.7 (80.0)
Mean daily minimum °C (°F)	14.8 (58.6)	16.2 (61.2)	18.1 (64.6)	19.2 (66.6)	20.2 (68.4)	21.5 (70.7)	19.6 (67.3)	19.1 (66.4)	19.8 (67.6)	18.8 (65.8)	15.3 (59.5)	14.1 (57.4)	18.1 (64.5)
Average precipitation mm (inches)	21 (0.8)	52 (2.0)	59 (2.3)	70 (2.8)	57 (2.2)	31 (1.2)	118 (4.6)	135 (5.3)	63 (2.5)	22 (0.9)	15 (0.6)	11 (0.4)	654 (25.6)
Average relative humidity (%)	50	48	51	52	42	44	56	61	51	41	42	43	48
Source: FAO
