= British Nigerians =

British citizens of Nigerian origin or Nigerian citizens of British origin

Total population
- Nigerian-born residents in the United Kingdom: 293,609 – 0.4% (2021/22 Census) (Note: Does not include Nigerians born in the United Kingdom or those with Nigerian ancestry); England: 266,877– 0.5% (2021); Scotland: 21,286 – 0.4% (2022); Wales: 3,891 – 0.1% (2021); Northern Ireland: 1,555 – 0.08% (2021); Nigerian citizens/passports held: 117,638 (England and Wales only, 2021); Ethnic Nigerians: 271,390 (England and Wales only, 2021)

Regions with significant populations
- Throughout the United Kingdom; In particular Greater London, South East England, East of England, North West England

Languages
- Predominantly; English (British, Nigerian, Pidgin), Yoruba and Igbo; Others; Nigerian languages

Religion
- Predominantly Christianity, minority Sunni Islam, traditional religions

Related ethnic groups
- Nigerian Canadians, Nigerian Americans, Nigerian Australians

British Nigerians (here meaning British people of Nigerian descent) have formed long-established communities in London, Liverpool and other industrial cities. A large number of British Nigerians live in South London and south-east London, with areas such as Peckham, Woolwich, Plumstead, and Thamesmead being given the moniker 'Little Lagos'.

== History ==
Nigerians have formed long-established communities in London, Liverpool and other industrial cities. The earliest known Nigerian presence in England took place over 200 years ago as a direct result of the transatlantic slave trade. Olaudah Equiano, born in what is now Nigeria and a former slave, lived in London and was involved in the debate that occurred in Britain over the abolition of the slave trade.

Like many other former British colonies, Nigeria has been a large source of immigrants to the United Kingdom. Prior to Nigerian independence from Britain, gained in 1960, many Nigerians studied in the UK along with other countries such as Australia and the United States; with the majority returning to Nigeria upon completion of their higher education. In the 1960s, civil and political unrest in Nigeria contributed to many refugees migrating to Britain, along with skilled workers.

Nigerians emigrated in larger numbers in the 1980s, following the collapse of the petroleum boom. This wave of migration has been more permanent than the pre-independence wave of temporary migration. Asylum applications from Nigerians peaked in 1995, when the repression associated with the military dictatorship of Sani Abacha was at its height.

In 2015, Britain's Independent Anti-Slavery Commissioner expressed concerns about the extent of contemporary slavery involving Nigerians smuggled to the UK. Of more than 2,000 potential victims of human trafficking referred to the National Crime Agency in 2014, 244 were from Nigeria. This represented a 31 per cent increase on 2013's figure. According to the BBC, "Campaigners believe the real figure of potential trafficking victims from Nigeria could be much higher".

== Demographics ==
=== Population ===
Nigerian-born population by region and country
Region / Country	Population	%	Largest community
England	266,877	0.47%	—N/a
Greater London	117,145	1.33%	Greenwich – 14,357 (5.0%)
South East	32,468	0.35%	Medway – 3,993 (1.4%)
North West	29,092	0.39%	Manchester – 10,329 (1.9%)
East of England	27,913	0.44%	Thurrock – 5,481 (3.1%)
West Midlands	19,911	0.33%	Birmingham – 5,946 (0.5%)
East Midlands	13,902	0.28%	Nottingham – 3,442 (1.1%)
Yorkshire and The Humber	12,454	0.23%	Leeds – 3,415 (0.4%)
South West	7,691	0.13%	Bristol – 1,431 (0.3%)
North East	6,301	0.24%	Newcastle – 2,082 (0.7%)
Scotland	21,286	0.39%	Aberdeen – 5,662 (2.5%)
Wales	3,891	0.13%	Cardiff – 1,366 (0.4%)
Northern Ireland	1,555	0.08%	Belfast – 862 (0.2%)
Figures based on the 2021 United Kingdom Census

The 2001 UK Census recorded 88,378 Nigerian-born people resident in the UK. The 2011 Census recorded 191,183 Nigerian-born residents in England and Wales. The censuses of Scotland and Northern Ireland recorded 9,458 and 543 Nigerian-born residents respectively. More recent estimates by the Office for National Statistics put the figure at 215,000 in 2019.

A Council of Europe report gives a figure of 100,000 Nigerians in the UK but suggests that this is likely to be an underestimate since it does not include irregular migrants or children born outside of Nigeria. Similarly, Nigerians with citizenship of another EU member state who then relocated to the UK are not necessarily included in this estimate. The report suggests to multiply the figure by between 3 and 8 to reflect the size of the Nigerian community in the UK.

=== Distribution ===
The UK's largest concentration of Nigerians is found in the capital city, London. The 2001 census found that Peckham was the home to the largest overseas Nigerian community in the UK, with 7% of the population of the Peckham census tract having been born in Nigeria. Many of the local establishments are Yoruba and Igbo owned. Nigerian churches and mosques can be found in the area. English has always been the predominant language of the local Nigerian British population as English is the main spoken language in Nigeria. The Yoruba language and the Igbo language are declining in use in the Peckham area despite the growing Nigerian population of Igbo and Yoruba descent. Outside London and South East England, the 2001 census recorded the largest Nigerian-born communities in the East of England and the North West.

=== Citizenship ===
Below is a table showing how many Nigerians were granted British citizenship and the right of abode in the period 1998 to 2009.

	Persons granted citizenship
1998	3,550
1999	3,481
2000	5,594
2001	6,290
2002	6,480
2003	6,300
2004	6,280
2005	6,615
2006	5,875
2007	6,030
2008	4,530
2009	6,955

=== Language ===
In England and Wales in 2011, 14,914 people (0.03% of all residents aged three and over) spoke Yoruba as a main language, 7,946 (0.01%) spoke Igbo and 6,639 (0.01%) spoke other Nigerian languages. In London, 10,119 people (0.13% of all residents aged three and over) spoke Yoruba as a main language, 5,252 (0.07%) people spoke Igbo and 3,577 (0.05%) spoke other Nigerian languages. However, in the most recent population census of 2021, the Igbo speaking population in England and Wales has increased significantly to 11,074 making Igbo the most spoken Nigerian language in the area.

== Education ==
According to the Institute for Public Policy Research, Nigerian pupils are among best performing student groups in the United Kingdom. Taking data for only England, a 2013 IPPR survey reported that the proportion of British Nigerian pupils gaining 5 A*–C grades at GCSE (including Maths and English) in 2010–2011 was 21.8 percentage points higher than the England mean of 59.6 per cent. This average was calculated using student data, where available, from various local authorities in England.

The number of Nigerian pupils at British private schools is growing. In November 2013, The Spectator noted that Nigerians, along with Russians, "are now the fastest-growing population in British private schools". In 2013, the number of entrants to private schools from Nigeria increased by 16 per cent.

According to Higher Education Statistics Agency data, 17,620 students from Nigeria were studying at British public higher education institutions in the academic year 2011–12. This made them the third largest country-of-origin group behind students from China and India. Of the 17,620, 6,500 were undergraduates, 9,620 taught postgraduates and 1,500 research postgraduates.

Research by Euromonitor International for the British Council indicates that in 2010, the majority (66 per cent) of Nigerian foreign students attended universities in the UK. The students are mainly drawn to these institutions' English language academic system. Their time studying in Britain is also facilitated by an established and large Nigerian community and by "the relative proximity of the UK to Nigeria".

== Notable British Nigerians ==
=== Nigerian citizens of British descent ===
- Caroline Danjuma, actress
- Eku Edewor, actress
- John Godwin and Gillian Hopwood, architects
- Lola Maja, makeup artist
- Sir Nicholas Mostyn, judge
- SHiiKANE, girl group
- Alan Vaughan-Richards, architect
- Remi Vaughan-Richards, filmmaker

=== British citizens of Nigerian descent ===
- Taiba Akhuetie, artist
- Babatunde Aléshé, actor, writer and comedian
- Steven Bartlett, entrepreneur
- Nabil Abdulrashid, comedian
- Charles Abani, International development professional
- Brian Belo, Celebrity and Big Brother Winner
- Efan Ekoku, footballer
- Reuben Agboola, footballer
- Tammy Abraham, footballer
- Timmy Abraham, footballer
- Jordon Ibe, footballer
- Dupsy Abiola, entrepreneur
- Chioma Nnadi, editor
- Faridah Àbíké-Íyímídé, writer
- Chizzy Akudolu, actress
- Fisayo Adarabioyo, footballer
- Tosin Adarabioyo, footballer
- Diran Adebayo, novelist
- Dotun Adebayo, journalist and presenter
- Tobi Adebayo- Rowling, footballer
- Elijah Adebayo, footballer
- Ovie Ejaria, footballer
- Rio Ngumoha, footballer
- Rio Adebisi, footballer
- Zach Awe, footballer
- Fikayo Tomori, footballer
- George Ndah, footballer
- Cynthia Erivo, actress
- Victor, Lord Adebowale, peer
- Adelayo Adedayo, actress
- Amaka Okafor, actress
- Callum Olusesi, footballer
- Adegbenga Adejumo, dubstep musician known as Benga
- Julie Adenuga, radio presenter and host
- Gabriel Agbonlahor, footballer
- Ola Aina, footballer
- Hakeeb Adelakun, footballer
- Sam Adekugbe, footballer
- David Ajiboye, footballer
- Tomi Adeloye, footballer
- Elijah Adekugbe, footballer
- Kayode Ajulo, lawyer and arbitrator
- Eniola Aluko, footballer
- Rinsola Babajide, footballer
- Ashleigh Plumptre, footballer
- Justin Oboavwoduo, footballer
- Jamaldeen Jimoh-Aloba, footballer
- Tyrique George, footballer
- Ethan Nwaneri, footballer
- John Akinde, footballer
- Sam Akinde, footballer
- Nicky Ajose, footballer
- Tunji Akinola, footballer
- Dipo Akinyemi, footballer
- James Akintunde, footballer
- Mofe Jemide, footballer
- Sone Aluko, footballer
- Ken Aboh, footballer
- Tolu Akinyemi (Poetolu), writer
- Abimbola Afolami, MP
- Kriss Akabusi, athlete
- Moyo Akandé, actress
- Adebayo Akinfenwa, footballer
- Adewale Akinnuoye-Agbaje, actor
- Wunmi Mosaku, actor
- Dele Alli, footballer
- Dele Sosimi, Musician
- John Amaechi, basketball player and psychologist
- Sammy Ameobi, footballer
- Shola Ameobi, footballer
- Dame Elizabeth Anionwu, nurse and professor of nursing
- Joe Aribo, footballer
- OG Anunoby, basketball player
- Ade Adepitan, wheelchair basketball player and television presenter
- Matthew Ashimolowo, clergyman
- Zach Awe, footballer
- Richard Ayoade, actor and comedian
- Stephen K. Amos, actor
- Rachel Adedeji, actor and singer
- Babatunde Aleshe, Comedian
- Femi Azeez, footballer
- Miguel Azeez, footballer
- Kemi Badenoch, Leader of the Opposition (United Kingdom)
- Adejoké Bakare, Michelin Star chef and restauranteur
- Ashley Madekwe, actress
- Tunde Baiyewu, singer
- Dame Shirley Bassey, singer
- Rapman, film director and musician
- Maleek Berry, musician
- Babatunde Aléshé, actor
- Happi, musician
- Sarah Forbes Bonetta, Yoruba princess, goddaughter to Queen Victoria
- John Boyega, actor
- Chukwudi Iwuji, actor
- Tobi Brown, YouTuber and member of the Sidemen
- Caleb Chukwuemeka, footballer
- Carney Chukwuemeka, footballer
- Carlton Cole, footballer
- Caroline Chikezie, actor
- Toheeb Jimoh, actor
- Tosin Cole, actor
- Kehinde Fadipe, actor
- Femi Oyeniran, actor
- Taio Cruz, singer
- Kwn, Musician
- Essosa, Musician
- Bellah, Singer
- Ms Banks, rapper
- Little Simz, rapper
- Enny, rapper
- Dave, rapper
- Knucks, rapper
- Labi Siffre, Musician
- Victoria Davies Randle, Yoruba princess, goddaughter to Queen Victoria
- Fisayo Dele-Bashiru, footballer
- Tom Dele-Bashiru, footballer
- Tino Anjorin, footballer
- Sope Dirisu, actor
- Dizzee Rascal, grime artist
- Ugo Ehiogu, footballer
- Chiwetel Ejiofor, actor
- Carmen Ejogo, actress
- Toni Tone, author
- Patience Agbabi, author
- Yomi Adegoke, author
- Bim Adewunmi, author
- Nikki May, author
- Buchi Emecheta, author
- Zain Asher, author and journalist
- Bola Agbaje, playwright
- Oladipo Agboluaje, playwright
- Olaudah Equiano, explorer, writer, merchant and abolitionist
- Florence Eshalomi, MP
- Bernardine Evaristo, author and Booker Prize winner
- Eberechi Eze, footballer
- John Fashanu, footballer
- Justin Fashanu, footballer
- Helen Grant, MP
- Saffron Hocking, actress
- Vick Hope, television and radio presenter
- AJ Odudu, television and radio presenter
- Gbemisola Ikumelo, actress
- Anne-Marie Imafidon, child prodigy
- Maro Itoje, rugby union player
- Adedayo Adebayo, rugby player
- Alex Iwobi, footballer
- NneNne Iwuji-Eme, Britain's first black female ambassador
- JME, grime artist
- Ariyon Bakare, actor
- Hannah John-Kamen, actor
- Damson Idris, actor
- Kola Bokinni, actor
- Zackary Momoh, actor
- Tomiwa Edun, actor
- Jimmy Akingbola, actor
- Razaaq Adoti, actor
- Deborah Ayorinde, actor
- Lolly Adefope, actor
- Lauryn Ajufo, actor
- Ann Akinjirin, actor
- Phina Oruche, actor
- Francesca Amewudah-Rivers, actor
- Charles Babalola, actor
- Obi Abili, actor
- David Ajala, actor
- David Jonsson, actor
- Delroy Atkinson, actor
- Hammed Animashaun, actor
- Fisayo Akinade, actor
- Valentine Nonyela, actor
- Martins Imhangbe, actor
- Chuku Modu, actor
- Anthony Joshua, professional boxer
- Joe Joyce, professional boxer
- Daniel Dubois, professional boxer
- Caroline Dubois,professional boxer
- Michele Aboro, professional boxer and kickboxer
- Moses Itauma, professional boxer
- Karol Itauma, professional boxer
- Henry Akinwande, professional boxer
- David Adeleye, professional boxer
- Ola Afolabi, professional boxer
- Delicious Orie, professional boxer
- Richard Riakporhe, professional boxer
- James Oyebola, professional boxer
- Dan Azeez, professional boxer
- Herbie Hide, professional boxer
- Olaitan Adam Olaore, amateur boxer
- Cush Jumbo, actress, writer
- Patti Boulaye, actress and singer
- Ola Onabule, Musician
- Hakeem Kae-Kazim, actor
- Nonso Anozie, actor
- Mowalola Ogunlesi, fashion designer and singer
- Walé Adeyemi, fashion designer
- Alexander Amosu, fashion designer and entrepreneur
- Tomi Agape, fashion designer and singer
- Duro Oluwo, fashion designer
- Clint Ogbenna, fashion designer
- Lola Maja, Fashion designer
- Priya Ahluwalia, fashion designer
- Bunmi Olaye, fashion designer
- Jason Njoku, entrepreneur
- Dupsy Abiola, entrepreneur
- Samson Kayo, actor
- Eman Kellam, television presenter and actor
- Yinka Bokinni, radio and television presenter
- KSI, YouTube personality, rapper and professional boxer
- Lemar, singer
- Jacob Banks, singer
- Femi Oguns, actor
- Ademola Lookman, footballer
- Archie Madekwe, actor
- Noni Madueke, footballer
- Chuku Modu, actor
- Amina J. Mohammed, Deputy Secretary-General of the United Nations, 2007–present
- Ugo Monye, rugby player
- Victor Moses, footballer
- Moses Ashikodi, footballer
- Shola Mos-Shogbamimu, lawyer, activist and political commentator
- Jamal Musiala, footballer
- Mikel John Obi, footballer
- Chizaram Ezenwata, footballer
- Beno Obano, rugby player
- Esther Odekunle, neurobiologist and antibody engineer
- Adebanji Alade, artist
- Chris Ofili, artist
- Michelle Ogundehin, television presenter
- Adebayo Ogunlesi, investment banker
- Christine Ohuruogu, athlete
- Victoria Ohuruogu, track athlete
- Femi Oke, journalist
- Kele Okereke, musician
- Lawrence Okolie, professional boxer
- Sophie Okonedo, actress
- Curtis Jones, footballer
- Nelson Abbey, footballer
- Arthur Okonkwo, footballer
- Ross Barkley, footballer
- Deji Olatunji, YouTuber
- Sir Ken Olisa, investment banker and businessman
- Ola Brown, entrepreneur
- Paul Onwuanibe, Businessman
- Michael Olise, footballer
- Eunice Olumide, broadcaster, actress, supermodel
- David Olusoga, historian
- Fiona Onasanya, MP
- Dame Chi Onwurah, MP
- Kate Osamor, MP
- Martha, Baroness Osamor, peer
- David Oyelowo, actor
- Abiodun Oyepitan, athlete
- Helen Oyeyemi, writer
- Annie Yellowe Palma, author
- Faridah Àbíké-Íyímídé, author
- Ben Okri, author
- Ashleigh Plumptre, footballer
- Hal Robson-Kanu, footballer
- Sade, singer
- Jean Adebambo, singer
- P2J, record producer
- ThisIzLondon, record producer
- DIL, record producer
- Bukayo Saka, footballer
- Seal, singer
- Yinka Shonibare, artist
- Remi Kabaka Jr, Musician
- Jim Legaxy, Musician
- The Bullits, Musician, Film director and producer
- Michelle Bello, Film director and producer
- Tion Wayne, rapper
- Sneakbo, rapper
- Skepta, grime artist
- Not3s, Musician
- Segun Akinola, Musician
- Aniff Akinola, Musician
- Oritsé Williams, Musician
- Ade Bantu, Musician
- Abiodun, musician
- Afrikan Boy, Musician
- Daniel Anjorin, murder victim
- Damilola Taylor, murder victim
- Tinie Tempah, rap artist
- Daley Thompson, Olympian
- Ola Abidogun, Paralympic athlete
- Dame Ijeoma Uchegbu, nano-particle researcher and academic
- Chuka Umunna, MP
- Reece Wabara, footballer and businessman
- Lola, Baroness Young, peer
- Ceechynaa, rapper
- Akinola Davies Jr., filmmaker, writer, visual artist
- Khadijah Dare, jihadist

== See also ==
- Nigeria–United Kingdom relations
- Nigerian Australian
- Nigerian American
- Nigerian Canadian
- Nigerians in Ireland
- Black British people
