= Landmark Africa Group =

Nigerian company

- Company type: Private
- Industry: Real Estate, Leisure, Lifestyle, Hospitality and Tourism.
- Founded: 1997
- Founder: Paul Onwuanibe
- Area served: Nigeria
- Website: landmarkafrica.com

Landmark Africa Group is a Nigerian hospitality, commercial real estate, and tourist destination development and services company. Landmark Lagos, the group's headquarters at Victoria Island, Lagos, Nigeria attracted over 3.5 million visitors in 2023.

Landmark's portfolio includes Hard Rock Café Lagos, Landmark Leisure Beach, Landmark Event Centre, and The Landmark Towers.

== History ==
Landmark Africa Group started in 1997 as a co-working office provider in Mayfair, London and expanded across Europe. In 2003, Landmark entered the African market after opening in Lagos, Nigeria. By 2006, it had expanded to Accra, Johannesburg, and Nairobi.

In 2014, Landmark completed the Landmark House at Ikeja, Nigeria. This was followed by the completion of Landmark Towers in 2015 and that same year.

In 2016, Hard Rock Café and Shiro Japanese Restaurants were introduced within Landmark Lagos, followed by the Landmark Leisure Centre in 2017.

In March 2020, Landmark Group and the Lagos State Government set up an emergency response COVID Isolation Centre on the grounds of the Landmark Village during the critical early stage of a global pandemic.

== Controversy on the demolition of Landmark Leisure Beach ==
Between April and May 2024 Landmark Leisure Beach was demolished between to make way for the Lagos – Calabar Coastal Highway. At the time of the demolition, the beach was a platform for over 50 micro, small, and medium-sized enterprises and over 1,000 employees. The group is currently seeking compensation from the Federal Government of Nigeria.

== Awards ==
In 2017 and 2019, Landmark Africa was named among London Stock Exchange’s Companies to Inspire Africa. Landmark Africa won Commercial Real Estate of the Year at the Africa Housing Awards in 2022 and Best Overall Developer (Nigeria) at Euromoney in 2023.
