= Nigerian Canadians =

Canadians of Nigerian birth or descent

Total population
- 126,000

Regions with significant populations
- Toronto, Montreal, Ottawa, Calgary, Winnipeg, Regina, Saskatoon, Vancouver, Edmonton, Brampton, Windsor, Quebec City

Languages
- English, Yoruba, French, Nigerian Pidgin, Igbo

Religion
- Christianity · Islam · Yoruba religion

Nigerian Canadians are citizens or residents of Canada who have total or partial Nigerian ancestry. It is estimated that approximately 64,900 Nigerians and their descendants reside in Canada, according to the 2016 national census, with the majority concentrated in the province of Ontario, particularly in the Greater Toronto Area.

== Migration history ==
Nigerians began migrating to Canada during the 1967–1970 Nigerian Civil War. Nigerians were not broken out separately in immigration statistics until 1973. 3,919 landed immigrants of Nigerian nationality arrived in Canada from 1973 to 1991. Between 1981 and 2001, roughly 70% of African-born residents in Canada arrived, with a considerable share being Nigerians.

The decision to migrate is shaped by a combination of structural challenges in Nigeria and opportunities available in Canada. In Nigeria, persistent governance issues and widespread corruption have undermined public institutions, discouraged return migration, and contributed to broader socio-economic instability. High unemployment and underemployment rates, a poorly functioning infrastructure, and widespread insecurity—including armed insurgencies and political unrest—continue to prompt skilled individuals to seek alternatives abroad.

According to the 2016 Canadian census, 51,800 people identified themselves as Nigerians, of whom about half lived in Ontario, particularly in the Greater Toronto Area. There are many more Nigerians in Canada, who identified themselves by their ethnic group instead of their country, such as 25,210 are Yoruba, 18,315 are Igbo, and 17,275 are from minor ethnic groups. There has also been a steady increase in the number of Nigerians living in the western cities of Canada, such as Calgary, Edmonton, and Winnipeg.

== Mental health ==
An October 2022 study found that over half of Nigerian respondents screened positive for depression, a figure notably higher than among other immigrant groups or native Nigerians. Key risk factors included being female, unmarried, having a low income, or remaining in Canada for more than a decade. These findings suggest a weakening of the "healthy immigrant effect", whereby immigrants typically arrive with better health that deteriorates over time due to acculturative stress and systemic marginalization.

== See also ==
- Canada–Nigeria relations
- Black Canadians
- Indo-Canadians
- Chinese Canadians
- Indigenous peoples in Canada
- Nigerian Australians
- British Nigerians
- Nigerian Americans
- Nigerian people in Italy
- Nigerians in the Netherlands
- Nigerians in Ireland
- Nigerians in Switzerland

== Sources ==
- Ogbomo, Onaiwu Wilson (1999), "Nigerians", in Magocsi, Paul R. (ed.), The Encyclopedia of Canada's Peoples, University of Toronto Press, ISBN 978-0-8020-2938-6, archived from the original on 8 October 2009
