= Lagos-Calabar Coastal Highway =

Expressway in Nigeria

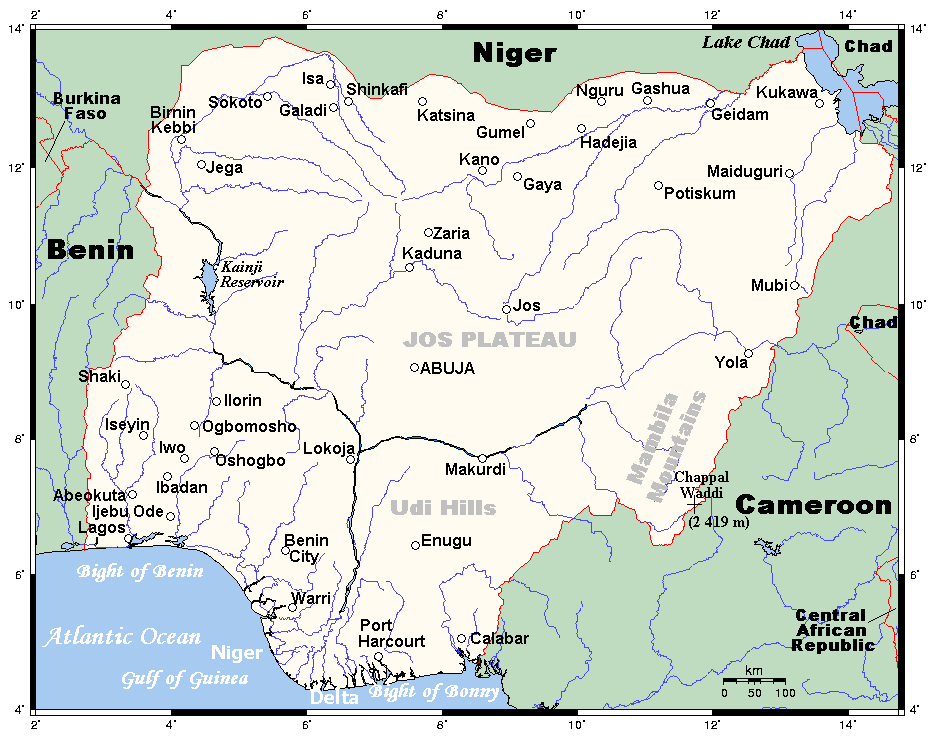

Route information
- History: Expected to be completed by 2031

Major junctions
- West end: Lagos
- South end: Calabar

Location
- Country: Nigeria
- States: Lagos State, Ogun, Ondo, Edo State , Delta State, Bayelsa State, Rivers State, Akwa Ibom State, and Cross River State

Highway system
- Transport in Nigeria

The Lagos-Calabar Coastal Highway is a 700-kilometre project under development (as of 2025) by Federal Ministry of Works that is planned to run from Victoria Island, Lagos to Calabar, Cross River State. The highway will pass through Ogun State, Ondo State, Edo State, Delta State, Bayelsa State, Rivers State, and Akwa Ibom State, before ending in Calabar. The project is intended to physically connect the western and south-eastern regions of Nigeria to improve cross-country connectivity and trade relations.

== Construction ==
The construction of the Lagos-Calabar Coastal Highway began in March 2024 by Federal Ministry of Works under the administration of Bola Tinubu with the first phase, which stretches 47.47 kilometres (29.50 mi) from Lagos. The highway is expected to be completed in eight years and will cost N7.5 billion per kilometer.

== Controversies ==
=== High costs and perceived misplaced priority ===
With initial estimated costs of between $11 billion and $12.5 billion, or roughly N14 trillion to N15.6 trillion Nigerian Naira (using 2024 exchange rates of ~ #1500:$1), commenters questioned the priority of such an expensive project given the prevailing economic condition of the country.

=== Contract bid/award transparency ===
Further, the quick passage of the funding bill in the national Assembly and contract award to a firm connected to the president raised suspicions.

The first phase of the project was awarded to Hitech Construction Company Ltd.

=== Environment impact assessments ===
The planned route of the highway traverses sensitive areas like wetlands and mangroves, the road is planned to pass through the Niger Delta swamp forests which may lead to deforestation efforts in order to create a route. Reports claim that required environmental assessments did not occur. Concerns include impact of heavy machinery during construction as well as post construction impacts of soil erosion and increased surface water runoff disturbing aquatic ecosystems. The actual highway may also disrupt migratory patterns for local wildlife as well as increase their likelihood of becoming roadkill.

=== Destruction of homes and businesses ===
Several businesses and homes were slated for demolition in order to create a path for the highway. Among the impacted businesses were portions of Landmark Leisure Beach.

While some of the demolitions were on government right of way which had been on the books for years and should have been vacant, portions of the highway's path were realigned to mitigate issues discovered as construction began.

=== Public reaction to commissioning of 30km Section 1 ===
On 26 May 2025, President Tinubu formally commissioned the first section of the Lagos-Calabar Coastal Highway. The 30-kilometre (19 mi) stretch, known as Section 1, runs from Ahmadu Bello Way to Eleko Junction in Lagos State. The event, which was attended by government officials and contractors, was described by the presidency as a major step forward in the implementation of a nationally strategic project.

However, the commissioning drew mixed reactions from the public and commentators. Critics noted that only a small portion of the planned 700-kilometre (430 mi) highway had been completed at the time, calling the ceremony premature. Others questioned the decision to celebrate progress before substantial work had been done across the remaining segments. Analysts also highlighted concerns about potential political motives behind the event.

== See also ==
- Eko Atlantic
- Landmark Leisure Beach
- Fourth Mainland Bridge
- Lagos–Ibadan Expressway
- Lagos-Calabar Railway
- East-West Road
