= Fourth Bridge =

Notable bridges named Fourth Bridge include:

- Fourth Nanjing Yangtze Bridge, across Yangtze River in Nanjing, Jiangsu, China.
- Godavari Fourth Bridge, across Godavari River in Rajahmundry, Andhra Pradesh, India.
- Fourth Thai–Lao Friendship Bridge, across Mekong River (and Thai-Lao border).
- Fourth Panama Canal Bridge, a Panama Canal crossing under construction.
- Fourth Mainland Bridge, a proposed Lagos Lagoon crossing in Lagos, Nigeria.

== See also ==
- Forth Bridge (disambiguation)
  - Forth Bridge, railway bridge in Scotland
