= Niger Delta swamp forests =

Ecoregion in Nigeria

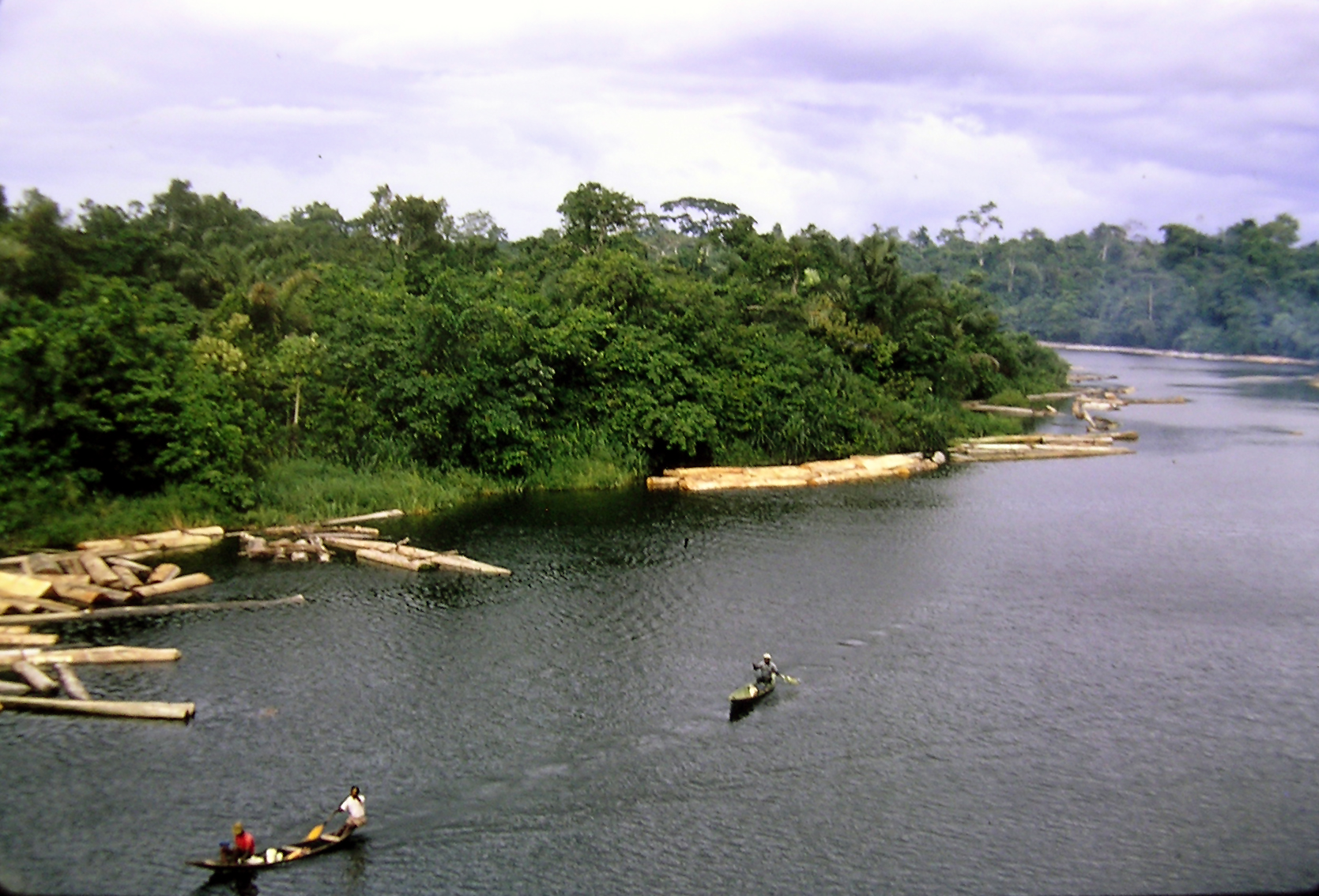
- Niger Delta swamp forest

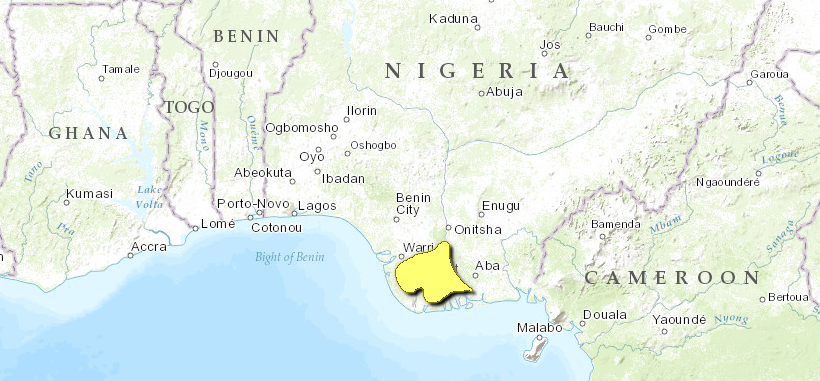
- Map of the Niger Delta swamp forests

Ecology
- Realm: Afrotropical
- Biome: Tropical and subtropical moist broadleaf forests
- Borders: Central African mangroves; Cross-Niger transition forests; Nigerian lowland forests

Geography
- Area: 14,500 km^{2} (5,600 mi^{2})
- Country: Nigeria
- Coordinates: 5°10′N 6°10′E

Conservation
- Conservation status: critical/endangered

The Niger Delta swamp forests is a tropical moist forest ecoregion in southern Nigeria. It consists of freshwater swamp forests in the Niger Delta of the Niger River. This swamp forest is the second largest in Africa after the Congolian swamp forests. Although there are large cities just outside the ecoregion, the area has been relatively isolated by the difficulty of building roads across the swamps, although this is changing with development of oil and logging industries, like the planned construction of the Lagos-Calabar Coastal Highway. Scientific surveys have only begun in recent years, and new species were being identified into the 1990s. Crude oil exploration and pollution has been a threat to forests in the Niger Delta region.

== Location and description ==
The Niger Delta swamp forests ecoregion covers a triangular territory at the mouth of the Niger River. The southern edge is set back about 10 km from the Gulf of Guinea, buffered by the Central African mangroves ecoregion where the effects of salt water are more pronounced. The western border of the ecoregion is formed along the Benin River, the northern tip is just north of the city of Aboh, and the eastern edge runs along the Imo River. The city of Port Harcourt is in the southeast corner of the ecoregion. The Niger Delta region of Nigeria is located along the Gulf of Guinea. It is the largest delta in Africa and the third largest delta in the world and also the most extensive marshland in West and Central Africa. The region spans from Aboh (5°33′49″ N and 6°31′38″ E) Ndokwa East, Delta State in the North to Palm Point (4°16′22″ N and 6°05′27″ E) Bayelsa State in the south. The east–west boundary lies between Benin or Ethiope River estuary (5°44′11″ N and 5°3′49″ E) Delta State in the west and Imo River estuary (4°27′16″ N and 7°35′27″ E) Ikot Abasi, Akwa Ibom State to the east.

The Niger Delta is built up from silt deposits from the Niger River. The landscape is flat with meandering branches of the main river. The Niger Delta is made up of various networks of rivers and creeks mostly distributaries of the Niger River. The soils of the delta vary by the shifting rivers and creeks, with sand and loam marking the remains of old levees, water-logged heavy clay in the backswamps behind the levees, and silty loam and clay on the higher ground. Niger delta can be delineated into four different ecological zones: namely mangrove forest, freshwater swamp forest, lowland rain forest and other vegetation occasioned by human impact on the environment. Mangroves are intricate intertidal forest that grow at the intersection within dry land and open sea in tropical regions and is the source of huge biological and none living resources. Nigeria's mangrove forest is located in the Niger delta region and is arguably the most exploited mangrove forest in the world. The Niger Delta region of Nigeria has a land mass of about 70000 km² representing 7.5% of Nigeria's land mass. It is made up nine oil – producing states viz; Abia, Akwa Ibom, Bayelsa, Cross River, Delta, Edo, Imo, Ondo and Rivers. These states contain more than 40 ethnic groups and have 185 Local Government Areas (LGAs) and inhabitants that speak about 250 different dialects. The Niger Delta region is amongst the highest hydrocarbon-rich regions on planet earth. Exploration and exploitation of hydrocarbons started in the region in 1957 with discovery of oil at Oloibiri in River State and has since been going on till date (2023).

== Climate ==
The ecoregion has a tropical monsoon climate, according to the Köppen climate classification (Am). This climate is characterized by a distinct dry season and rather constant temperatures throughout the year, with the average temperature of each month above 18 °C (64 °F). Less than 60 mm, but more than (100-(average/25) mm, of precipitation fall during the driest month. This climate is in the middle of a tropical savannah and a tropical rainforest. The rainy season runs from March–April to October. Precipitation ranges from 2,500 mm/year in the north to 4,000 mm/year along the coast in the south. Relative humidity is 90–100% for most of the year.

Degradation is putting freshwater marsh forests in the Niger basin in danger, so it's important to comprehend their composition, distribution, and trends. In a study that evaluated the floristic diversity and composition of sixteen one-hectare forest patches, 116 species from 82 genera and 36 families were discovered. Sites that were disturbed exhibited reduced species richness but greater species variety and stem density. The study highlights the necessity for species stability and biodiversity and stresses the significance of focused conservation in damaged areas.

== Flora and fauna ==
Approximately 67% of the ecoregion is covered in closed forest, mostly broadleaf evergreen. Another 13% is open forest, 8% herbaceous wetland, 5% urban or built up, 3% under agricultural cultivation, and the remainder permanent and seasonal water. The abura (Hallea ledermannii) tree, formerly common, has mostly been logged out of the delta. Common trees in the flood forest include Oil palm (Elaeis guineensis), Azobe tree (Lophira alata), African nutmeg (Pycnanthus angolensis), Ricinodendron heudelotii, Hallea ledermannii, Flatcrown tree (Albizia adianthifolia), Wild mango (Irvingia gabonensis), (Klainedoxa gabonensis), (Treculia africana), and species of (Ficus).

The delta's three zones are the middle backswamp area, the eastern delta flank, and the flood forest. Although there is a limited diversity of faunal species in the delta, new species have been discovered recently. It is unknown which plants are native to the delta, despite the unusual floral ensemble. The development of roads and canals, the finding of petroleum, and the felling of abura, a valuable timber species, have all contributed to the habitat loss of the delta. The region is confronted with issues such as expanding human populations, political instability, conflicts, and unsustainable resource extraction.

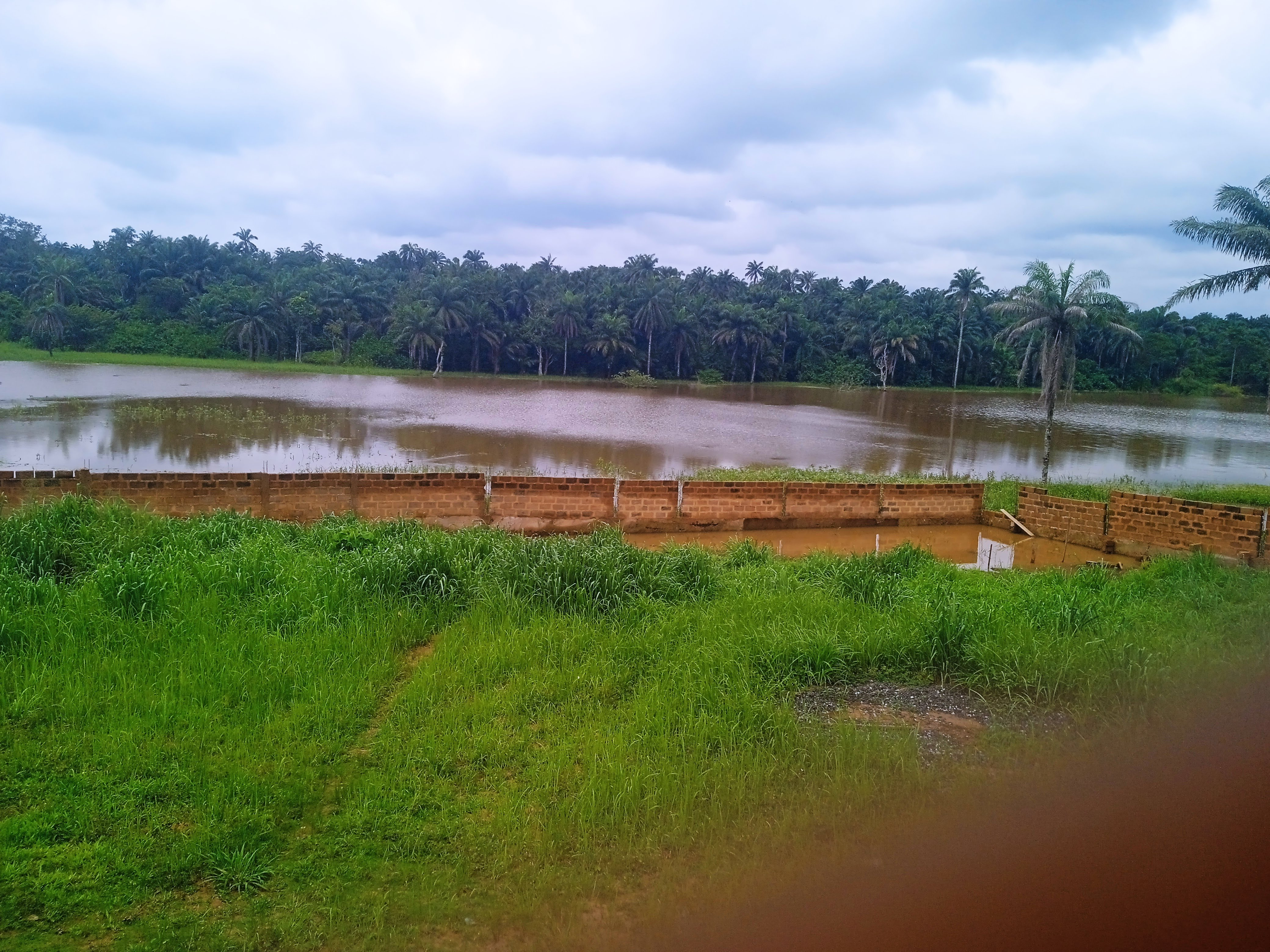
A swamp caused by establishment of Dam in the Niger-Delta region

== Protected areas ==
While about 8% of the ecoregion is nominally under some form of administrative protection, most such territory is in forest reserves subject to heavy logging pressure due to economic growth and social development. Expectedly, Nigeria has several national parks and conservation areas but lately, the conservation and protected areas are in serious contracting trajectory as a result of deforestation and conversion of forest resources to non forest use.

Some of the protected areas in the Niger Delta Region include:

=== Edumanon forest reserve ===
The last sighting of chimpanzee some decades ago in the Niger Delta Region was at the Edumanon Forest Reserve. Edumanon forest reserve includes part of old Nembe and Brass local government areas in Bayelsa State. It has a calculated area of about 9,324 hectares. The area is home to several oil and gas installations. Other activities going on in the area encompass construction, hunting, agricultural production including oil palm cultivation. The road connecting Ogbia to Nembe traverses Edumanon forest reserve. Edumanon Forest Reserve is home to some important wildlife species. A survey in 2006 identified the presence of the endangered Nigeria-Cameroon chimpanzee in the Edumanom Forest Reserve and Ologbo Forest Reserve in the region.

=== Apoi creek forest reserves ===
Niger Delta Region has 2 Ramsar-listed coastal and freshwater wetlands; Apoi creek forest reserve and Upper Urashi. Notably, there are a total of 11 Ramsar-listed coastal and freshwater wetlands in Nigeria covering about 1,076,730 hectares. Apoi Creek forest reserve was earmarked as a Ramsar site #1751 in 2008. Other common features of the Niger Delta ecosystem such as marshes, mangroves and freshwater swamps are also present in Apoi creek forest reserves. Apoi Creek forest reserves covers an area of about 29,213 hectares of land. or estimated to be approximately 190 km^{2}. The Apoi creek forest reserves was officially promulgated 1975. Apoi creek forest reserve is of considerable ecological importance and is home to a lot of rare, unique and/or threatened species and is also a note able breeding and nursery ground for fisheries. The Apoi forest reserves is a sort of a castle for some endemic species such as the Niger Delta Red Colobus monkey (Procolobus epieni), Nigerian white-throated guenon (Cercopithecus erythrogaster pococki including other primates namely the olive colobus. The presence of Niger Delta Red Colobus, Putty-nosed monkey, Red-capped mangabey have been noted in Apoi creek reserves forest particularly in the vicinity of Gbanraun, Kokologbene, Ukubie. The International Union for Conservation of Nature have classified Procolobus epieni to be 'alarmingly endangered' and is currently reported to be one of the world's 25 most endangered primates. Economic and social activities impact negatively on Apoi creek forest reserves resulting in the shrinkage of the area. These activities are namely hunting, logging, installation of oil and gas exploration and exploitation facilities through canalization. Apoi creek forest reserves resources is an important source of livelihood to the rural population by provision of fuel wood, agricultural land and fisheries.

=== Taylor creek forest reserve ===
Taylor creek is situated close to the vicinity of the Bayelsa state National park reserve. It is otherwise known as Taylor creek/Bayelsa state National park reserve. Taylor Creek forest reserve is a lowland (<35 meters below the sea level). It is bordered by the following communities namely Biseni, Kaiama, Kalama, Odi, Zarama, Okordia, Odoni, and Ikarama. Taylor creek forest reserve covers an estimated area of about 220 km^{2} . It is an overwhelming seasonal swamp forest shore of the Niger River that cut across a number of communities in both Bayelsa and Rivers State. Some lakes and creeks namely Oluku lake, Esiribi lake, Oruma, Oyulo, Asa, Egbegidi, Azari, Egbe, Opuzuno, Puro, Akpidetoru, Isemu, and Abaniigina) are situated throughout the length of the drainage system of Taylor Creek. Taylor Creek reserve area is susceptible to seasonal flooding because of its closeness to the River Niger. Three distinct habitat can be located in Taylor creek reserve including seasonally flooded freshwater swamp forests which are distinguished by Raphia hookeri (Raphia palm), Mitragyna ciliata (Abura), Nauclea diderrichii (Opepe), Khaya ivorensis (Mahogany), Irvingia gabonensis (African bush mango), Eleais guineensis (Oil palm), Musanga cecropoides (Umbrella tree) amidst more such as ferns, epiphytes and macrophytes; riparian forests distinguished by thick and fully grown high canopy around Karama, Adibawa and Biseni, and derived savanna forest located at Nyambiri Zarama. The existence of 27 species of mammals, 34 species of reptiles and 10 species of amphibians were observed in the area. Also the existence of two-spotted civet (Nandinia binotata) in the Taylor creek Forest Reserve, Bayelsa State have been observed.

=== Nun river forest reserve ===
Nun river forest reserve is located in the tropical rainforest which is distinguished by multi-faceted vegetation, torrential rains and periodic or seasonal flooding. The Nun river forest encloses about 97.15 km^{2}. It is otherwise publicly known as Wilberforce Island. The presence of several species of mammals, avian fauna and reptiles have been observed in the area. Earlier, the Nun river forest used to be habitation for elephant (Loxondonta africana), African buffalos (Syncerus coffa) and Pygmy hippos (Hexaprotodon liberiensis) which however have not been seen in the area for over three decades.

=== Ikibiri creek forest reserve ===
Ikibiri Creek forest reserve is located in Bayelsa State in the Niger Delta region. It is reach in forest resources which includes timber products, medicinal plants, ornamentals plants, and wildlife. Unfortunately, the reserve like other reserves in the Niger Delta region is on the shrinkage trajectory due to some social and economical, developmental and administrative reasons.

=== Igbedi creek forest reserve ===
Igbedi creek forest reserve is situated in Bayelsa State in the Niger Delta region of Nigeria. The reserve is popularly known and spelled as Igbedi creek forest reserve. However, it is also referred to as Egbedi creek forest reserve. Igbedi creek is a branch of the upper Nun River in the Niger Delta. Dredging is the common human impact or activity on the creek in the period between 2009 and 2011. Two-spotted civet (Nandinia binotata) have been sighted at Igbedi forest reserve in Bayelsa State.

== Impacts of Biodiversity of Protected Area ==
Expectedly, the Niger Delta region of Nigeria is home to diverse species of wildlife and vegetation. The presence of 28 species of amphibians associated with the family Bufonidae (genera Bufo and Nectophryne), Pipidae (Silurana and Hymenochirus), Ranidae (Hylarana, Ptychadena, Aubria, Conraua, Hoplobatrachus, and Phrynobatrachus), Arthroleptidae (Arthroleptis), Rhacophoridae (Chiromantis), Microhylidae (Phrynomantis), and Hyperoliidae (Hyperolius, Afrixalus, Leptopelis, Phlyctimantis, and Opisthothylax) from six localities in the Niger Delta Region of Nigeria have been observed. The habitance of endemic and threatened primates species consisting of endemic Sclater's guenon (Cercopithecus sclateri), Nigerian white-throated guenon (Cercopithecus erythrogaster pococki), red-capped mangabey (Cercocebus torquatus) and the endangered Nigeria-Cameroon chimpanzee (Pan troglodytes ellioti) are prevalent in the Niger Delta Region. Endemic mammals notably Heslop's pygmy hippopotamus (Hexaprotodon liberiensisheslopi) are now extinct in the Niger Delta region on account of poor administration of the protected area, lack of proper conservation and management strategies.

== Trends in Protected Areas ==
Although Niger Delta boasts a multitude of freshwater ecosystems, the primary forest reserves within the region consist of Taylor Creek, Apoi Creek, Nun River, Edumanon, Ikibiri Creek, and Igbedi Creek. Considering the percentage of loss, it is evident that Edumanon and Nun River forest reserves have been significantly affected, resulting in a substantial reduction in their size. Ikibiri and Igbedi Creek have experienced the least amount of impact. The normalized difference vegetation index (NDVI) of significant protected areas in Niger Delta, spanning from 1987 to 2011 have been documented. In comparison to several other freshwater swamps in the Niger Delta, the degree of deterioration in the protected area is relatively minimal. Findings in 2014 also indicate that the deterioration of these protected areas is more pronounced when they are situated in proximity to major expressways. Consequently, the reduction in size observed in Apoi Creek and Ikibiri Creek is relatively minimal, likely attributed to their remote and less accessible locations. In contrast, Nun River Forest Reserve, Edumanon (connected to Ogbia and Nembe via a major road), and Taylor Creek/Bayelsa State National Park experience more substantial shrinkage, possibly due to their proximity to significant roads such as the one leading to Niger Delta University and Bayelsa International Airport. The primary effects on the protected area are primarily deforestation and degradation. It was noted that Taylor Creek is the most affected among the protected areas in Niger Delta

== Challenges of Protected Area ==
Commonly, biodiversity entails diverse species of living organisms (viz: plants, animals, microbes) found on earth regardless of the environment (arboreal, aquatic and terrestrial). Environmental degradation and deforestation have greatly affected biodiversity resources. It has been observed that pollution, hypertrophication, soil acidification, heavy metals, thermal pollution, nuclear pollution, oil and gas pollution and human pollutants are major contaminants responsible for biodiversity decline in the Niger Delta. Traditionally, Niger Delta Swamp forests avails beneficial services to the local inhabitants, national and the international community. Due to social and economic considerations as a result of quest for livelihood and subsistence there has been a great stress on the environment leading to degradation and deforestation of the swamp forest ecosystem of the Niger Delta. Most common cause of environmental degradation and deforestation in the Niger Delta wetland include oil and gas exploration and exploitation, excessive logging, and bush burning. Important forest products namely fuel wood, timber, medicinal plants, wildlife, food are the substantial source of forest products and services. and extreme utilization leads to degradation and deforestation of the natural ecosystem of the Niger Delta region. There are many consequences for enlarging rate of deforestation on the biodiversity of the Niger Delta ecosystem, consequent upon the negative impact on the ecosystem, the biodiversity of the region is threatened while some others are already extinct. Additionally, diverse land use namely construction works, urbanization, industrialization and forest reserve degradation which encompasses excessive exploitation of wildlife, illegal poaching, logging and bush burning are major cause of decline of protected areas. As a result of above mentioned factors, it has been observed that wildlife is freely killed and exhibited for sale within the surroundings of some of the reserves. An important factor orchestrating the decline in protected areas is bush burning. Latterly, there has been an increase in the rate of bush burning. Consequent upon the immoderate degradation resulting in loss of important forest resources, reserve areas were established to conserve the habitat. To this effect various species are protected by Nigerian Federal, State and Local government laws which were enacted to ensure the conservation and protection of the environment. This notwithstanding, some species are still traded openly in Nigerian markets. There are subsisting laws and legislation on conservation of natural resources in Nigeria. These laws and legislation include the national resources conservation act 1989 (established the conservation council to formulate and implement policies to address forestry, fisheries, wildlife, soil and water conservation), Federal Environmental Protection Agency Act (Chapter 131, Laws of the Federation, 1990) established to enhance conservation of natural resources through strict environmental policies, the Environmental Impact Assessment Act (No. 86 of 1992) (to ensure environmental impacts assessment on the environment before execution of project that may impact on the environment), Endangered species (control of international trade and traffic) Act 11 of 1985 (to ensure conservation of wildlife and rare and endangered species through prohibition of hunting, capture, or trading of any of the 91 animals species that are classified under endangered wildlife and listed in schedules 1 and 2) and National Parks Decree (Decree No. 36 of 1991) (ensure protective habitat for wildlife species and preserve the beauty and conservation of the natural vegetation). However, despite the enactment of these laws and legislations, the exploitation of forest resources including in the protected areas is still on the increase rendering the laws and legislation ineffective in conservation of threatened forest resources. It has been observed that wildlife species that are under the protection of the federal law Act 11, Schedule I (namely Atherurus africanus, Tragelaphus spekei, Hyemoschus aquaticus, Neotragus batesi, Aonyx capensis, Manis tricuspis, Uromanis tetradactyla) and Schedule II (viz; Genetta sp., Nandinia binotata, Viverra civetta, and different Cercopithecus species) are openly traded in the markets

== Deforestation in the Niger Delta ==
Forest is defined as a land ranging more than 0.5 hectares containing trees that are higher than 5m with a dense upper layer of foliage also called canopy cover of 10%. Deforestation is simply defined as prolonged reduction of tree foliage cover to less than ten percent minimum threshold. Deforestation in Nigeria appear in the dominant ecological zones of the Niger Delta namely the mangroves, lowland rainforest and freshwater forest.

Economic growth and social development are the cause of enlarging demand for resources causing man to adopt measures that may negatively impact the natural environment and biodiversity. Such measures include clearing the forest for infrastructure development, food production and mining. Geographical considerations such as closeness to roads and settlements, soil fertility, rainfall, mineral deposits and population are also reasons for human impact on forests. Government policy is another major factor that impacts forests and may influence deforestation. Causes of deforestation in the Niger delta region are diverse, multifaceted and includes; urbanization, quarrying, salt and salt extraction pollution from industries, agro–industrial chemicals, petroleum and gas exploitation, vacancy of appropriate legislation and enforcement. About 80% of Nigeria's over 2000 industrial establishment are cited in the coastal regions including Lagos, Port Harcourt and other locations in the Niger delta. Industries sited in the coastal region and the Niger Delta region of Nigeria include oil and gas, petrochemical fertilizer plant, aluminum smelting plant, food, plastics, pharmaceuticals, cement, brewing and wood pulp and paper. Due to the industrial establishments in the coastal and Niger delta region, large human population live and work in the Niger delta region resulting in the deforestation of the mangrove forest in the region. Study by Niger Delta Development Commission (NNDC) in 2006 indicate that the total population of the region was over 28 million people making the Niger Delta region one of the highest population dense region in Nigeria. These pipelines run through the rainforest and mangroves with occasional leakage and unintended discharges into the environment resulting in further degradation and deforestation of the ecosystem.

The planned construction of the Lagos-Calabar Coastal Highway will also encourage deforestation to make a route for the highway.

=== Causes of deforestation in the Niger Delta ===
In the Niger Delta region, the reasons for deforestation have been mainly attributed to crude oil exploration and pollution, population increase, urban development, and agricultural production. The human desire for social, economic and cultural development may negatively impact the environmental resources. The result of this negative impact is deforestation.

There has been an enlarging negative impact in forests and deforestation in the Niger Delta due to increasing population pressure on the natural environment, the desire for fertile agricultural land and the need for additional forest products and services to cater for the growing population and the need for industrial raw materials. thus ensuing in the destruction of forest and land resources in the region. Land degradation involves soil erosion and fertility degeneration. This results in reduction in the usability of the land for agricultural production. requiring the clearing of more forest land for agricultural production. Increase in urban areas which include buildings, roads, construction sites, industrial establishments, public utilities and other infrastructural facilities accounted for an estimated area of mangrove swamp forest of 185.7 square kilometres (71.7 sq mi) out of 3,459 square kilometres (1,336 sq mi) of the total mangrove forest studied. A study of the interlink between various sectors of the economy on the rate of deforestation indicate that the export of forest products, fuelwood consumption and agricultural production and affiliated industries directly increase deforestation in the country.

=== Oil and gas exploration and exploitation ===
Every facet of oil exploration and exploitation has a negative impact on the ecosystem and the local biodiversity of the environment. Seismic exploration of oil by oil companies entails clearing of seismic lines, use of dynamite in excavation which results in deforestation and degradation of the environment. Installation of oil and gas pipeline is required for distribution of crude oil and gas to desired locations. About 7,000 km of pipeline have been installed in the Niger Delta region. Construction and installation of these pipelines entail clearing enormous amount of habitat to make way for the pipelines for distribution of crude oil and gas to desired locations. These pipelines run through the rainforest and mangroves with occasional leakage and unintended discharges into the environment resulting in further degradation and deforestation of the ecosystem.

=== Oil spillage ===
Majority of the occurrence of known and disclosed oil spillages happened in the mangrove swamp forest, which is arguably the most reproductive ecosystem and is rich in flora and fauna. In the last 50 years, about 9 million – 13 million (1.5 million metric tons) of oil have been discharged in to the Niger Delta ecosystem as a result of crude oil production and distribution. Some notable instances of oil spillage in the Niger Delta Region ecosystem include the July 1979 Forcados tank 6 Terminal in Delta State which spilled 570,000 barrels of oil into the Forcados estuary resulting in massive pollution of the aquatic environment and surrounding swamp forest. Starting from January 17 to January 30, 1980, the Funiwa No. 5 Well in Funiwa Field discharged about 421,000 barrels of oil into the Atlantic Ocean. At the end of the spillage, 836 acres of mangrove forest within six miles off shore was polluted and the ecosystem destroyed. According to UNDP 2006:181 about 3 million barrels of oil were discharged into the Niger Delta environment through 6,817 oil spill occurrences in the period between 1976 and 2001.

=== Gas flaring ===
Gas flaring has been on going in the Niger Delta for decades. According to the Energetic Solution Conference (2004), the Niger Delta region has about 123 gas flaring sites resulting in Nigeria being one of the highest emitter of green house gases in Africa. Emissions of carbon dioxide in the Niger Delta rank amongst the highest in the world. About 1.8 billion cubic feet of gas is flared everyday in the Niger Delta resulting in a discharge of about 45.8 billion kilowatts of heat into the atmosphere.

The temperature of the Niger Delta region has been raised as a result of gas flaring rendering vast area of the environment destroyed and uninhabitable. Out of a total of about 125.5 million cubic meters of gas produced in the region between 1970 and 1986, about 102.3 (81.7%) million cubic meters were flared.

In 2004, the gas pipeline belonging to Nigerian Liquefied Natural Gas Company that cut across through Kala-Akama, Okrika mangrove forest leaked and burnt the environment for three days. The ecosystem of the area was engulfed in fire and was completely destroyed.

The heat emitted by gas flaring destroys vegetation surrounding the flaring site, destroys mangrove swamps and salt marshes, inhibits the growth and flowering of some plants, causes soil degradation, deforestation and reduces agricultural productivity.

Acid rain is another cause of degradation and deforestation within the Niger Delta region resulting from gas flaring which has led to loss of biodiversity and culminating in destruction of forest and economic crops. The appearance of grasses and shrubs in some parts of the region is a confirmation of loss of natural forest due to acid rain. However, other factors such as agricultural activities and oil exploration and exploitation also cause loss of natural forest.

== See also ==
- Deforestation in Nigeria
- Environmental issues in the Niger Delta
