= Dupsy Abiola =

British barrister

Modupeola Abiola
- Born: March 1982 (age 44); North London, United Kingdom
- Other name: "Dupsy" Abiola
- Occupation: Businesswoman
- Known for: Intern Avenue, Dragons' Den
- Parents: * Moshood Kashimawo Olawale Abiola (father); * Dele Abiola (mother)

Modupeola "Dupsy" Abiola (born March 1982) is a British-Nigerian (non-practising) barrister, entrepreneur and businesswoman. She is the Global Innovation Officer of the International Airlines Group (IAG). She is the founder and CEO of Intern Avenue, an online internship website designed to connect employers with students and graduates. Dupsy appeared on the Thomson Reuters Power List named as one of the most influential black businesswomen in Great Britain in 2013. She has been featured in the press and on television relating to recruitment, business, and entrepreneurial pursuits. She pitched on series ten of BBC television show Dragons' Den, attracting an investment offer from business tycoon, Peter Jones.

== Early life ==
Dupsy Abiola was born in London, England. She is the daughter of Chief M.K.O. Abiola, a titleholder within the Nigerian chieftaincy system, and Dele Abiola, one of his wives. Her father was a famous and successful Nigerian business tycoon and philanthropist. Dupsy grew up with her mother and five siblings in North London. She has paternal half-siblings with whom she has limited contact. At aged nine, Dupsy independently set up a business producing and selling Puzzle magazines with a friend at school making a "tidy profit". M.K.O. Abiola was a strong influence on her interest in business.

== Family life ==
Dupsy's father, the 14th Aare Ona Kakanfo of the Yoruba people, became an active campaigner for civil rights and democracy and won the first free and democratic presidential election in Nigeria in June 1993. Following the result, the military regime refused to relinquish power and declared an annulment. Chief Abiola was later placed under indefinite detention and was denied contact with the outside world (including his family). His incarceration sparked national and international outrage. Many supporters - including the U.N. secretary-general and Nobel laureate, Kofi Annan - attempted to secure the chief's release. There were widespread protests and high-profile political assassinations, including key civil rights campaigners and members of the Abiola family. M.K.O. Abiola died very suddenly on the day of his intended release on 7 July 1998 when Dupsy was sixteen. The circumstances surrounding the death of her father remain an incredibly difficult and emotional subject for her.

== Education ==
Despite a troubled upbringing, Dupsy was a gifted student who received academic prizes and awards including a Frederica Lord Bursary and an International English Speaking Union Scholarship. Dupsy attended South Hampstead High School for secondary school and then went on to read law at New College, Oxford. She was an elected JCR committee member, and an active public speaker, and legal debater. In 2004, Dupsy was notably singled out by the fashion designer, Tom Ford, during an event at the Oxford Union, who interrupted his speech to praise her beauty and dress sense.

== Career ==
=== Legal career ===
After university, Dupsy was awarded a Lord Denning Scholarship and Eastham Scholarship by the Honourable Society of Lincoln's Inn and began her career at the Bar. She attended Inns of Court School of Law and was called to the bar in 2006. Dupsy moved into Private Practice as an employed barrister after completing her pupillage at 22 Old Buildings. She worked on a number of complex and high-profile cases, including involvement in the Wembley litigation.

=== Intern Avenue ===
Dupsy left her career as a lawyer to create Intern Avenue in late 2010, which is her first large scale entrepreneurial project. Intern Avenue publicly launched in Autumn 2012. Intern Avenue was developed in London which has begun to develop a blossoming technology scene. The site has been well-received and featured by the national press and technology press including Wired. The website is defunct as of January 2023.

In November 2018, Abiola was named to the Financial Times' list of the 'Top 100 minority ethnic leaders in technology.'.

=== International Airlines Group ===
In January 2018, she was appointed as the Global Innovation Chief at the International Airlines Group.

== Television and reception ==
Dupsy appeared on Channel Four in February 2012 discussing entrepreneurship with Business Minister, Mark Prisk MP. On 7 October 2012, Dupsy pitched her business on episode 5, Series 10 of BBC Dragons' Den and appeared in extended BBC footage on the "Psychology of a Successful Pitch". She was offered backing by business tycoons, Peter Jones and Hilary Devey. Intern Avenue became the first recruitment business to successfully pitch on Dragons' Den since its inception in 2004. Peter Jones described her as a "real entrepreneur in the making" and that her pitch was "superb".
