= Paul Onwuanibe =

African business magnate (born 1965)

- Born: June 29, 1965 (age 61); Paddington, London, United Kingdom
- Education: University of Nigeria; South Bank University, London; Imperial College, London; London Business School
- Occupation: Real estate executive
- Spouse: Ikunna Onwuanibe
- Children: 2

Paul Onwuanibe (born 29 June 1965) is a British-Nigerian businessman and investor. He is best known as the CEO of Landmark Group, an African-focused hospitality and real estate company.

== Early life and education ==
Onwuanibe was born in Paddington, London to George Onwuanibe and Dorothy Onwuanibe. His parents are of Nigerian descent. He has one elder sister, Angela, and one elder brother, Anthony.

His father was a diplomat and wanted his children to stay in touch with their Nigerian roots, so Paul and his siblings' education would be a mix of both countries and cultures. He attended primary and part of his secondary school in the United Kingdom, with a brief stint at Eton College for boys. At 16, he was admitted into the University of Nigeria where he obtained a BSc (Hons) in Architecture.

Onwuanibe returned to London after his first degree and proceeded to South Bank University, London in 1989 for a master's degree in Construction Project management followed by a Masters in Environmental Design and property development from Imperial College, London in 1990. In 1993 he obtained an MBA from the London Business School.

== Career ==
In 1991, he became the development director for Beacon Housing UK. In 1995 he became executive responsible for Property and Logistics team Regus, a global serviced office company.

In 1997, Onwuanibe became chief executive officer of Landmark Group, a Nigerian hospitality, commercial real estate, and development and services company.

In 2000, Onwuanibe was appointed as project architect for Anthony Barber Associates (Chartered Architects) UK.

== Personal life ==
In 1993, he married a medical doctor, Dr (Mrs) Ikunna Onwuanibe; they have two children.
