= Canada–Nigeria relations =

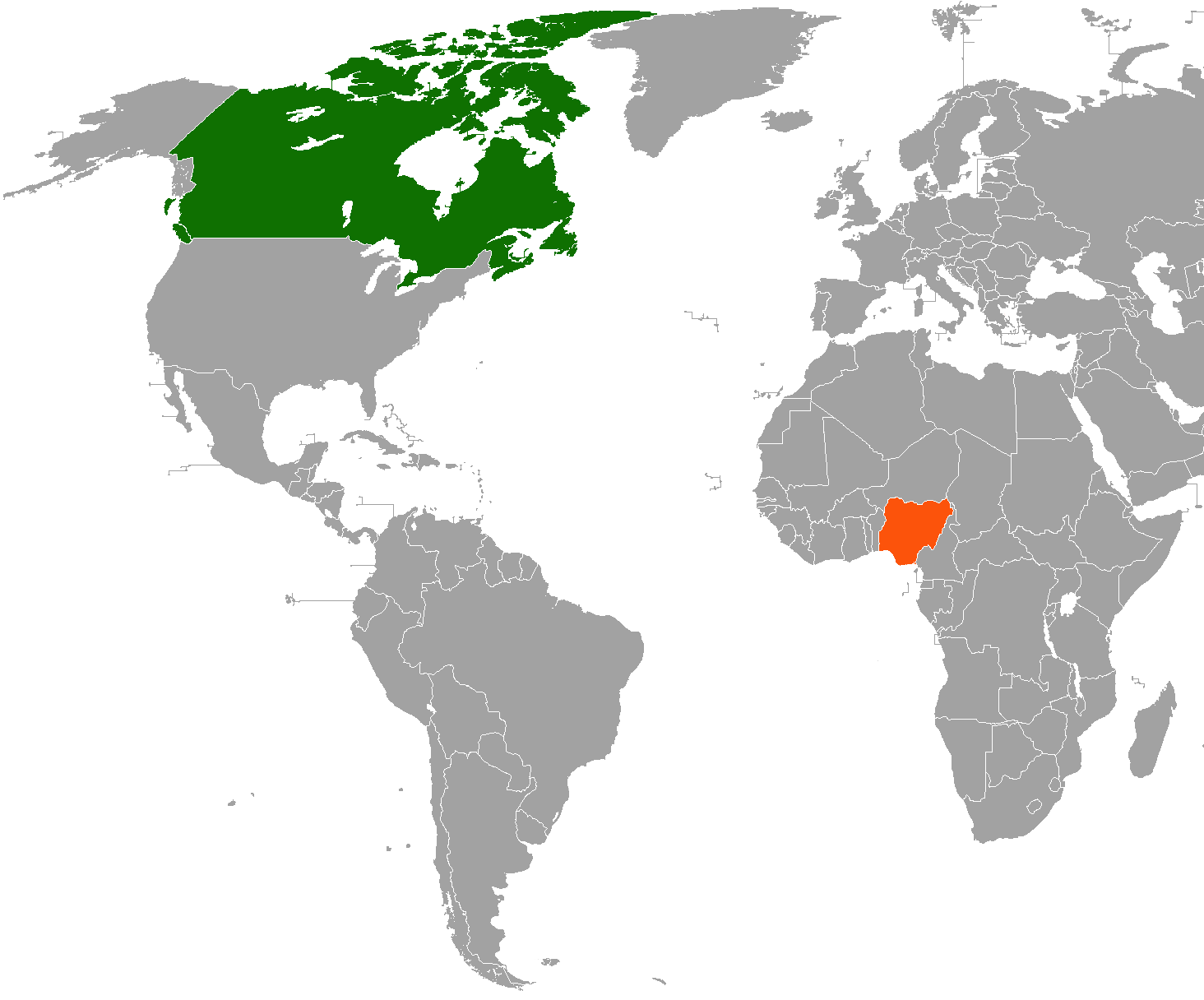

- Canada: Nigeria

Canada–Nigeria relations refer to the current and historical relationship between Canada and Nigeria.

== Historical relations ==
Canada and Nigeria have a long history of diplomatic ties, dating back to Nigeria's independence in 1960, where Canada initially maintained a non-interference policy. The two countries have maintained positive relations, with Canada providing aid and support for Nigeria's development and governance initiatives.

In January 2019, both governments expressed a commitment to restore bilateral relations and enhance trade, with Canadian High Commissioner Philip Baker emphasizing collaboration in sectors like mining and aviation.

== Political relations ==
Canada has been an advocate for democratic governance in Nigeria and supported peace processes during conflicts. The two countries regularly engage in high-level meetings to promote political and economic cooperation.

In 1995, following the execution of Ogoni activist Ken Saro-Wiwa, Canada called for tough sanctions against the Nigerian military regime under General Sani Abacha.

The two nations signed a Foreign Investment Promotion and Protection Agreement in May 2014, which was ratified by Canada but not by Nigeria due to inconsistencies with Nigeria's 2016 bilateral investment treaty. Nigeria called for a revision or renegotiation of the agreement.

== High-level visits ==
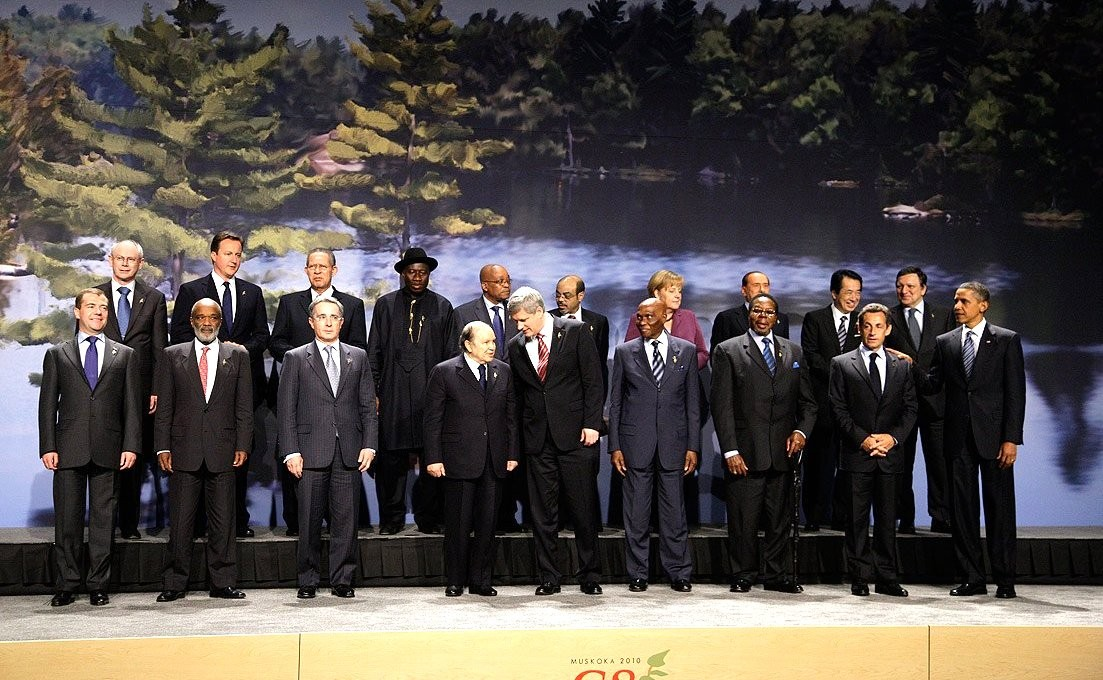
Canadian Prime Minister Stephen Harper and Nigerian President Goodluck Jonathan attending the 36th G8 summit in Toronto; June 2010.

High-level visits from Canada to Nigeria

- Prime Minister Pierre Trudeau (1981)
- Prime Minister Jean Chrétien (1999, 2002)
- Governor General Julie Payette (2018)

High-level visits from Nigeria to Canada

- President Olusegun Obasanjo (2000, 2002)
- President Goodluck Jonathan (2010)
- Vice President Yemi Osinbajo (2022)

== Military relations ==
Canada was a key actor within the Commonwealth, advocating for the Nigerian military junta's transition to democracy. Its stance during the 1995-1996 period was marked by a push for economic sanctions and pressure on the Nigerian government.

== Economic relations ==
Nigeria is Canada’s second-largest trading partner in Africa, with a trade exchange of approximately $1.4 billion in 2020. Canada exports aircraft, vessels, and cars to Nigeria, while importing oil and processed food.

On 4 July 2024, Nigerian ministers met with a Canadian delegation to discuss economic reforms, business opportunities, and investments. Canadian executives from major companies, such as CIBC Group and Mattamy Asset Management, expressed interest in Nigeria's investment potential.

The Canada-Nigeria Business & Investment Summit, held in Toronto on 9-10 October 2024, exemplified the growing economic collaboration between both countries, especially in sectors like agriculture, energy, fintech, infrastructure, and natural resources. Nigeria's status as Africa's biggest oil exporter and its vast natural gas reserves make it an attractive market for Canadian investment.The event, organized by Alpha Oasis International and supported by Ontario's Ministry of Economic Development, aims to boost investments and knowledge exchange, promoting mutual growth and prosperity.

Canada's Africa Oil Corporation is expanding its operations in Nigeria, with plans to double production and reserves, focusing on deep-water oil fields operated by TotalEnergies and Chevron. This marks a significant growth in bilateral economic relations, with Canada also investing in other sectors like agriculture and infrastructure.

== Humanitarian Aid ==
In May 2026, the Canadian Government announced that direct aid to strictly Nigeria-focused projects starting or active in 2026 would be $14.2 million, while total investments in Nigeria and other West African Countries would be $30 million.

== Cultural relations ==
There are over 55,000 Canadians of Nigerian descent, fostering strong people-to-people ties. Additionally, more than 12,000 Nigerian students study in Canada, with increasing interest in Canadian educational institutions.

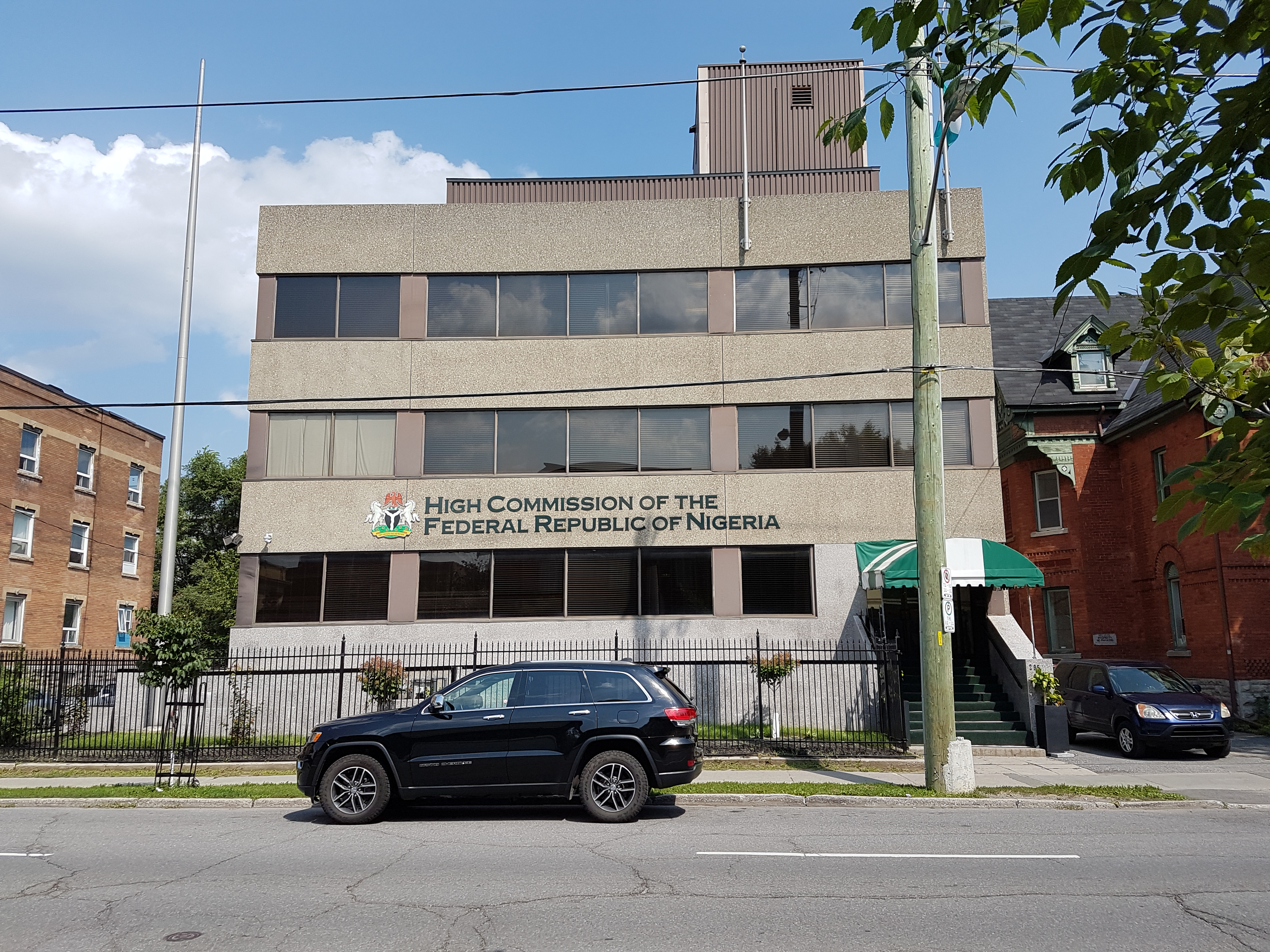
High Commission of Nigeria in Ottawa

== Resident diplomatic missions ==
- Canada has a high commission in Abuja and a deputy high commission in Lagos.
- Nigeria has a high commission Ottawa.

== See also ==
- Nigerian Canadians
