= Forth Bridge (disambiguation) =

The Forth Bridge is a railway bridge over the Firth of Forth in Scotland, opened in 1890.

Forth Bridge may also refer to:

== Bridges ==
- Kincardine Bridge, opened in 1936
- Forth Road Bridge, opened in 1964
- Clackmannanshire Bridge, opened in 2008
- Queensferry Crossing, opened in 2017

== Other ==
- The Forth Road Bridge, 1965 film
- Operation Forth Bridge, the UK's national plan following the death of Prince Philip, Duke of Edinburgh

== See also ==
- Fourth Bridge
