= Charles Abani =

United Nations official

Resident Coordinator of the United Nations
- Incumbent
- Assumed office May 2020

Personal details
- Born: May 17, 1960 (age 66) Afikpo North, Nigeria
- Citizenship: Nigerians; British
- Education: Saïd Business School; Ahmadu Bello University; University of Nigeria

Charles Abani (born May 17, 1960) is a Nigerian-British Diplomat, International Development Professional and the United Nations Resident Coordinator in Ghana. Previously, he was Director for West, Central Africa and Haiti at Chemonics International and has previously served as Chief of Party for United States Agency for International Development Civil Society Project in Nigeria.

== Early life and education ==
Charles Abani was born in Afikpo North, Nigeria to an Igbo Father and English mother. Abani holds a bachelor's degree in History and Archaeology from the University of Nigeria, Nsukka and a master's degree in political science from Ahmadu Bello University, Zaria. He also attended the Oxford University Saïd Business School where he studied Business Administration and Management.

== Career ==
Between 1995 and 1999, Charles Abani served as the Nigeria Country Director for the Voluntary Service Overseas VSO, managing development strategy and overall input from 90 volunteers across the country. In 1999, he was appointed the Nigeria Country Director for ActionAid and subsequently served as Africa Regional Operations Manager until 2007 when he moved to Oxfam as the South Africa Regional Director. Charles Abani has also served as the managing director for ARK International, Chief of Party of the United States Agency for International Development Nigeria Civil Society Project and Director of West, Central Africa and Haiti at Chemonics. He has had extensive experience in networks of development and management in Africa as well as development work at an international level. He also has experience of working in the private sector and government in the UK.

== United Nations Resident Coordinator ==
In May 2020, the United Nations Secretary-General António Guterres appointed Charles Abani as the United Nations Resident Coordinator in Ghana.
