= Lagos-Calabar Railway =

Railway line in Nigeria

Overview
- Status: Under construction
- Termini: Lagos; Calabar

Service
- Type: Heavy rail

History
- Work began: 2014

Technical
- Line length: 1,402 km (871 mi)
- Number of tracks: 2
- Track gauge: 1,435 mm (4 ft 8 1/2 in) standard gauge
- Electrification: None
- Operating speed: 150 km/h (93 mph)

Lagos-Calabar Railway also known as West-East Coastal Rail Line is a proposed 1,400 kilometres standard-gauge coastal railway from Lagos to Calabar. Connecting Lagos State in Southwest to the Southern Coastal cities in the south.

== History ==
The Lagos-Calabar Railway Line Project was conceived by the administration of Goodluck Jonathan in 2014 with approval from the Federal Executive Council. However, the project never saw the light of the day.

In February 2016, the administration of President Muhammadu Buhari agreed with the Export-Import (Exim) Bank of China to finance part of the project.

In April 2017, the project plans were approved and announced by the Federal Government, however, by September Of the same year, the Exim Bank of China communicated its inability to fund the Lagos-Calabar rail project.

In March 2021, Rotimi Amaechi, minister of transportation, insinuated plans (loan) for alternate funding options. Leading to the Federal Government entering into a counterpart funding with Standard Chartered Bank for the construction of the Lagos-Calabar coastal rail with US$11bn out of the US$14.4bn needed for the implementation of the project.

By August 2021, the Federal Executive Council approved the ratification of the award of a contract worth US$11,174,769,721.74 for the implementation of the project

== Construction ==
The Lagos-Calabar rail route will consist of 1,402 kilometres of railway track, 22 railway stations with auxiliary amenities, administrative space, and level crossings. Installation of safety systems, electrical systems, lighting systems, and signalling systems, as well as the laying of tracks and electricity lines, are among the other tasks.

The first phase runs between Calabar and Port Harcourt, while the second phase will run between Port Harcourt and Lagos through Onitsha.

== Routes ==
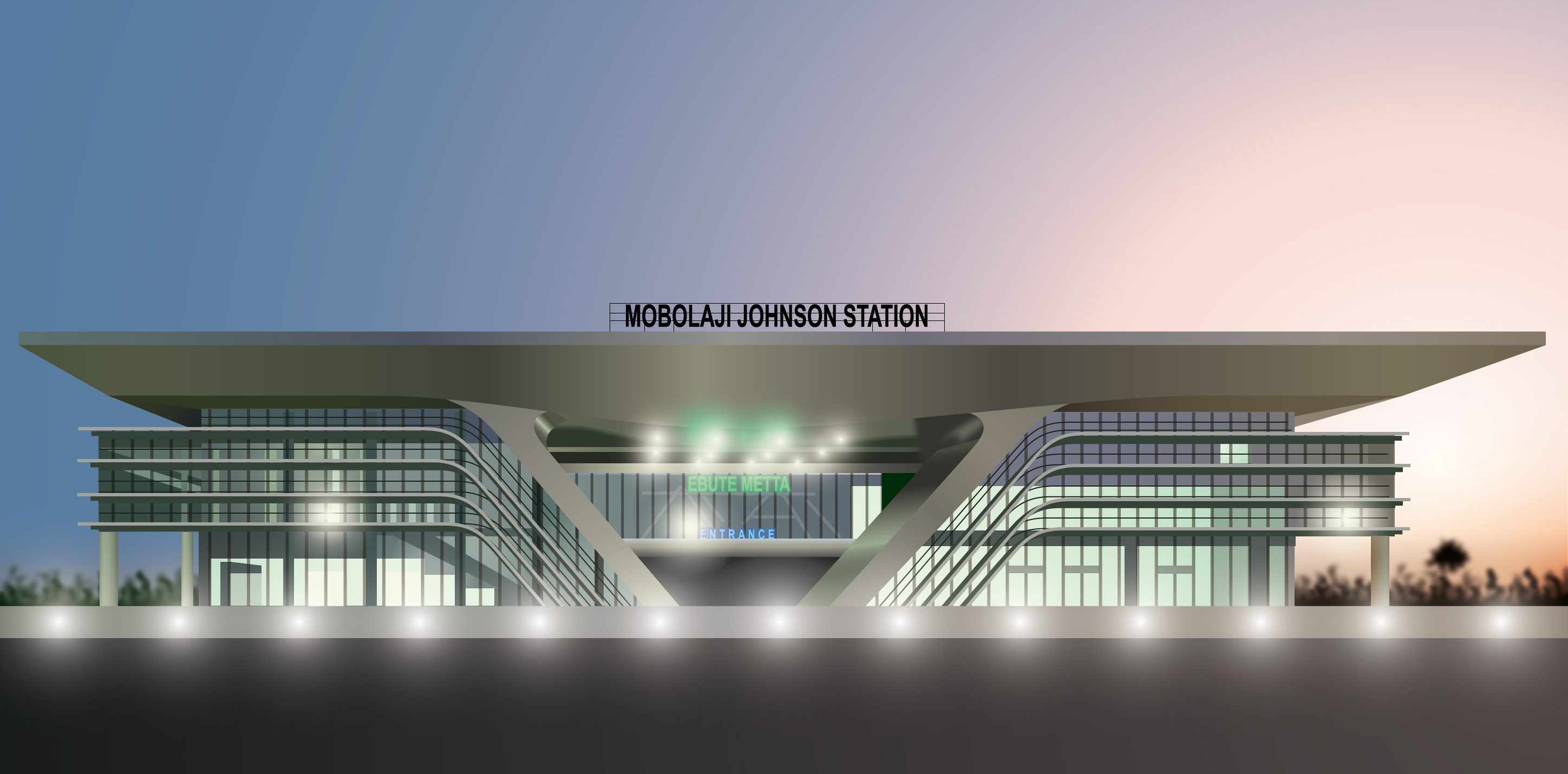
Mobolaji Johnson Train Station, Lagos

According to Lai Muhammed, the Minister for Information, “The proposed route alignment is to go from Lagos to Shagamu, Shagamu to Ijebu-Ode, Ijebu-Ode to Ore, Ore to Benin City, Benin to Sapele, Sapele to Warri, Warri to Yenagoa, Yenagoa to Port Harcourt, Port Harcourt to Aba, Aba to Uyo, Uyo to Calabar, Calabar to Akamkpa to Ikom, to Obudu Ranch, with a branch line from Benin City to Asaba, Onitsha Bridge and then Port Harcourt to Onne Deep Seaport.”
