= Landmark Leisure Beach =

Beach in Lagos, Nigeria

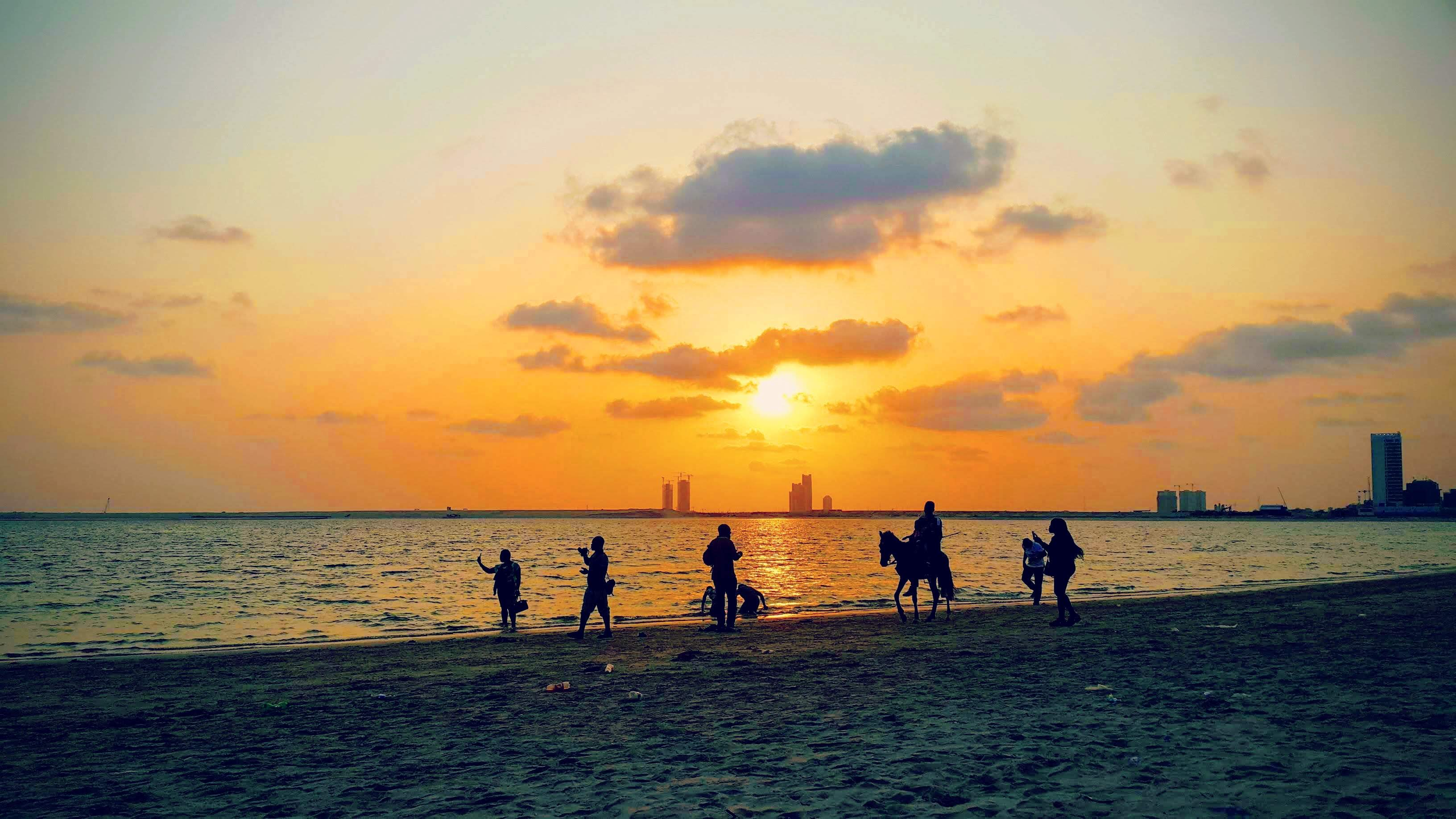
Sunset at Landmark Beach

Landmark Leisure Beach is a beach that is located in Lagos, Lagos State Nigeria. It is at numbers 3 & 4 Water Corporation Road, VI, Lagos. The beach is open to the public every day. It employed paid lifeguards who watch over the beach and have rescued many people from drowning.

== Concerts ==
Many concerts are staged at the Landmark Leisure Beach, especially during December. On 30 December 2021, Nigerian musician Wizkid performed at the beach. The show was organized by Toro Entertainment Company.

== Demolition ==
In April 2024, the federal government of Nigeria through the Minister of Works, Eng. Dave Umahi announced the construction of the 700km Lagos-Calabar Coastal Highway that will span from Lagos state to Calabar in Cross River State.

This announcement led to the demolition of infrastructures and properties on the route of the proposed highway. Some part of the Landmark Beach was demolished amidst controversies surrounding the building of the 700km highway.
