= Essosa =

- Born: Joy Aiseosa Bakare; London, England
- Genres: R&B; pop
- Occupations: Singer; songwriter
- Instrument: Vocals
- Years active: 2018–present

Joy Aiseosa Bakare, also known by her stage name Essosa, is a British-Canadian singer and songwriter. Her R&B songs take inspiration from the 1990s and the 2000s. She released her debut single in 2018 and achieved viral success in 2023 with her single "Waste My Time".

== Early life ==
Joy Aiseosa Bakare was born in East London to Nigerian parents and was raised near Toronto, Canada before later moving to Essex. She began playing piano at age three and writing songs at age eight. She studied pharmacy at University College London, where she also recorded musical demos. Her stage name comes from a reworking of her middle name.

Her debut single, "The Retreat", was a protest song released in 2018, when she was 17 years old, in response to Brexit. She released her debut extended play, Dreamworld, in 2021, preceded by the singles "Belong" and "Memory"; she also released her song "Lemonade" in November 2021. She released one song, "Butterflies", in 2022. She released the single "Waste My Time" in 2023; it became popular on TikTok and, by 2024, it had been used in over 71 thousand videos on the platform and accumulated over 30 million streams on Spotify. She soon signed to Atlantic Records and her single "Tell Nobody" was released in November 2023 as part of her EP Essie's World, released on 20 August 2024.

== Discography ==
=== Extended plays ===
List of extended plays, with selected details
Title	Details
Dreamworld	Released: 23 April 2021; Label: Self-released; Format: Streaming, digital download
Essie's World	Released: 16 August 2024; Label: Atlantic; Format: Streaming, digital download

=== Singles ===
==== As lead artist ====
List of singles as lead artist, showing year released and album name
Title	Year	Album
"Belong"	2021	Dreamworld
"Memory"	2021	Dreamworld
"Lemonade"	2021	Non-album singles
"Butterflies"	2022	Non-album singles
"Waste My Time"	2023	Essie's World
"Tell Nobody"	2023	Essie's World
"Only One"	2024	Essie's World
"Guilty"	2024	Essie's World
"Muse"	2025	
"Signs"	2025	
"Touch bby"	2026	

==== As featured artist ====
List of singles as lead artist, showing year released and album name
Title	Year	Album
"When Said and Done" (Pricey featuring Essosa)	2020	Non-album singles
"Strawberry Perfume" (Chenayder featuring Essosa)	2023	Non-album singles
"Ease Your Mind" (Don Toliver)	2026	Octane
