= Esther Odekunle =

British neurobiologist and antibody engineer

Esther A. Odekunle
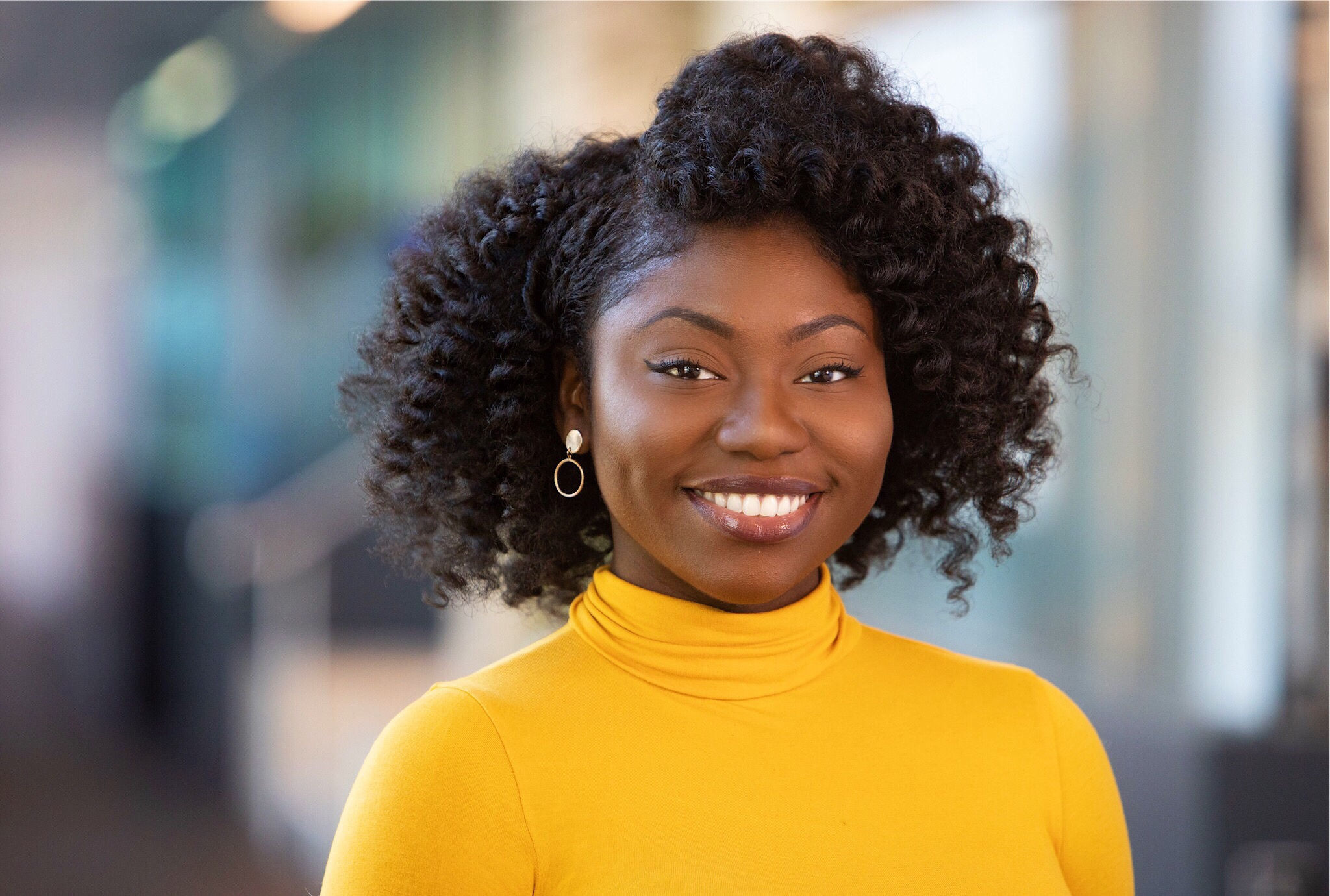
- Education: B.S., Biochemistry; Ph.D., Neurobiology
- Alma mater: Queen Mary University of London
- Known for: Science communication
- Scientific career
- Fields: Neuroscience; Molecular biology Pharmacology
- Workplaces: GlaxoSmithKline
- Thesis: Discovery and Characterisation of Vasopressin/Oxytocin-type Signalling in an Echinoderm and a Xenacoelomorph (2018)

Esther A. Odekunle is a British neurobiologist and antibody Engineer. She works as an antibody engineer for the pharmaceutical company GlaxoSmithKline (GSK), where her research focuses on identifying and removing physical and chemical risks from therapeutic antibodies to improve their viability as medications. She also promotes the visibility of diverse professionals in STEM.

== Early life and education ==
Odekunle was born the youngest of her siblings and raised in the United Kingdom by Nigerian parents who had emigrated to the UK. She was inspired by her teachers while growing up and by books on animals and the human body, encouraging her interest in science from a young age. After initially considering a career in medicine, she earned both the B.S. in biochemistry and Ph.D. in neurobiology from Queen Mary University of London. Her doctoral work at Queen Mary focused on neuropeptide systems in starfish, culminating in her 2018 thesis. Discovery and Characterisation of Vasopressin/Oxytocin-type Signalling in an Echinoderm and a Xenacoelomorph. She chose to work on starfish because of little-understood abilities such as regeneration. After having worked with mice and rats as an undergraduate, she was also encouraged by the fact that starfish do not bite. She took a year off between degree programs and received full funding for her doctoral work from the Society for Experimental Biology.

== Career ==
Odekunle's goal in academia was not to remain there as a professor, but rather to "explore a specific scientific area in great depth and contribute to the scientific field" and eventually to apply her scientific skills to therapeutics., noting that her passion lay in exploring receptor-ligand interactions at an amino acid level to drive medicine discovery. As an antibody engineer at GSK, she works to clone antibodies from B cells and optimize them as potential targeted treatments for specific disease targets such as cancers, viral infections, and bacterial infections. Because of the limitations placed on what scientists in her position in the pharmaceutical industry can say about their work, Odekunle had to develop a voice within the scientific community apart from speaking about things that are confidential. This led her to speaking out on racism in academia and science and to helping to encourage and make more visible those in science who are underrepresented. This she does on various social media platforms. Some of her content, such as her episode on Henrietta Lacks on her YouTube channel has been shared with students at early as well as advanced levels of education.

I’m now using [my] uniqueness to encourage up and coming scientists from diverse backgrounds to follow their passions even if the people who currently represent their fields don’t look like them.

— Dr. Esther Odekunle

In 2021, Odekunle was selected as a Rising Star Finalist in the Black British Business Awards' STEM category.

== Publications ==
- Mayorova, Tatiana D.; Tian, Shi; Cai, Weigang; Semmens, Dean C.; Odekunle, Esther A.; Zandawala, Meet; Badi, Yusef; Rowe, Matthew L.; Egertová, Michaela; Elphick, Maurice R. (1 December 2016). "Localization of Neuropeptide Gene Expression in Larvae of an Echinoderm, the Starfish Asterias rubens". Frontiers in Neuroscience. 10 (553): 553. doi:10.3389/fnins.2016.00553. PMC 5130983. PMID 27990106.
- Odekunle, Esther A.; Semmens, Dean C.; Martynyuk, Nataly; Tinoco, Ana B.; Garewal, Abdullah K.; Patel, Radhika R.; Blowes, Liisa M.; Zandawala, Meet; Delroisse, Jérôme; Slade, Susan E.; Scrivens, James H.; Egertová, Michaela; Elphick, Maurice R. (31 July 2019). "Ancient role of vasopressin/oxytocin-type neuropeptides as regulators of feeding revealed in an echinoderm". BMC Biology. 17 (60): 60. doi:10.1186/s12915-019-0680-2. PMC 6668147. PMID 31362737.
- Odekunle, Esther A.; Elphick, Maurice R. (17 April 2020). "Comparative and Evolutionary Physiology of Vasopressin/ Oxytocin-Type Neuropeptide Signaling in Invertebrates". Frontiers in Endocrinology. 11 (225): 225. doi:10.3389/fendo.2020.00225. PMC 7181382. PMID 32362874.
- Odekunle, Esther (14 August 2020). "Dismantling systemic racism in science". Science. 369 (6505): 780–781. Bibcode:2020Sci...369..780O. doi:10.1126/science.abd7531. PMID 32792390. S2CID 221113638.
