= Toni Tone =

British-Nigerian author and content creator

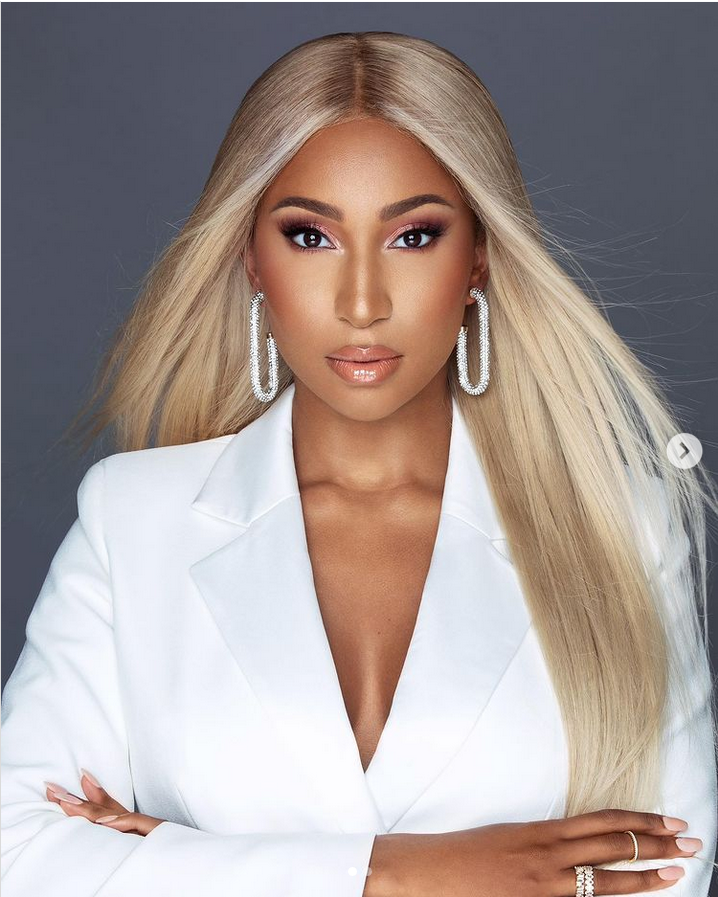
- Born: Toni Adenlé
- Education: Brunel University
- Occupation: Author

Toni Omotola Adenlé (born 1989), known professionally as Toni Tone, is a British-Nigerian author, content creator and host of Toni Told Me. She is known for her best-selling book I Wish I Knew This Earlier: Lessons on Love (2021).

== Early life ==
Born in Nigeria, she was raised in Oxford, England, and recognises it as her hometown.

Adenlé attended London's Brunel University, where she received a BSc Degree in Communications and Media.

== Career ==
Adenlé worked a range of jobs, including managing student communications at the University of Oxford. While working at the university, she went through a difficult breakup and took to Twitter to share her musings about life, love, and managing relationships. Her tweets regularly went viral and her Twitter following quickly grew.

In 2019, she became an ambassador for the charity Young Women's Trust, a feminist organisation working to achieve economic justice for young women across the United Kingdom.

In February 2021, Adenlé became the host of BBC Radio 1Xtra's Money Moves podcast – an eight-part podcast providing young people with a toolkit to confidently navigate their relationship with money and finances.

As a result of her writing on Twitter, Adenlé was approached by HarperCollins to write a book, and she agreed a deal for her debut book with 4th Estate, a HarperCollins imprint.

In 2021, she was part of Channel 4's Highlife cast, a docu-ality series based on British West Africans. She appeared on the show alongside her brother Tazer and her sister-in-law Kamille.

== Works ==
- Tone, Toni (2021). I Wish I Knew this Earlier: Lessons on Love
