= Nigerians in Ireland =

Total population
- 2022: 8,368 (Nigerian citizens)
- 2022: 20,559 (Nigerian born)

Regions with significant populations
- Dublin and surroundings (Clondalkin, Tallaght, Blanchardstown), Limerick, Galway, Letterkenny

Languages
- English, Hausa, Yoruba, Igbo, Other languages of Nigeria

Religion
- Christianity, Islam

According to the 2022 census, there were 8,368 resident Nigerians in Ireland in 2022. 20,559 persons usually resident in the state in 2022 were born in Nigeria, an increase of 3,990 since 2016. They constitute the largest African group in the country.

Historical population
Year	Pop.	±%
2002	9,225	—
2006	16,327	+77.0%
2011	19,780	+21.1%
2016	16,569	−16.2%
2022	20,559	+24.1%

== Migration ==
=== History ===
The first significant mass-migration of Nigerians to Ireland comprised Nigerians from the United Kingdom. Most came only with the intention of extending their UK visas and then returning, but the ones who failed settled down in Ireland as illegal immigrants. After the landmark High Court case Fajujonu v. Minister for Justice, which prohibited deportation of parents of Irish-born children, more Nigerians began coming to Ireland. Then, from around 1996, during Ireland's "Celtic Tiger" period of rapid economic expansion, they came seeking either opportunities for jobs, benefits or to set up niche businesses aimed at other African migrants providing goods and services which they expected would not otherwise be available in the Irish market. Between 2002 and 2006, the population of Nigerian citizens in Ireland grew by 81.7%, according to census figures, making them the country's fourth-largest migrant group at the time. Many recent migrants are asylum-seekers. However, from 2002 to 2009 the number of Nigerian applicants for asylum fell sharply, dropping from a peak of 4,050 to just 569. The sharp drop in Nigerian asylum applicants was due to the obtaining residency via parentage of Irish citizen children or marriage to Irish and EU spouses and due to the high failure rates in the granting of asylum and the granting of leave to remain.

=== Motivations ===
Among Nigerian respondents to a 2008 survey, 40% had no friends or family in the country at all prior to arrival. This is double the rate of other migrant groups such as Indians and Lithuanians (EU citizens), though slightly less than Chinese. 22% mentioned education and training as their motivation for migration, while 16% mentioned joining family. They are far more likely (90%) than other migrant groups surveyed to have children, whether in Ireland or elsewhere. Furthermore, about half state that they are responsible for full or partial support of other adult or minor family members. More than 80% were married, and those, for about one-fifth, their partners lived in Nigeria rather than in Ireland; more than 90% have children.

Prior to 2004, citizenship laws entailed that any child born in Ireland was an Irish citizen, regardless of the nationality of the parent or their link to Ireland. After the landmark High Court case Fajujonu v. Minister for Justice, which prohibited deportation of parents of Irish-born children, there was a perception that Nigerians were coming to Ireland, initially seeking asylum and then giving birth shortly upon arrival. In the Supreme Court case of L. and O. v. Minister for Justice, Equality and Law Reform, delivered on 23 January 2003, it was held that a foreign national parent of an Irish-born child did not have an automatic entitlement to remain in the State with the child. As a result of that case the Minister reviewed his policy. The Minister decided that the separate procedures for the consideration of residency applications based solely on parentage of an Irish-born child should cease with effect from 19 February 2003. At that date a total of 11,493 applications, which had been made on this basis, were outstanding. This review became known as the IBC 05 Scheme. In addition, Irish citizenship laws were amended by the Irish Nationality and Citizenship Act, 2004 for future cases, removing the automatic right of Irish citizenship at birth where parents of the child were non-Irish. As of January 2006, a total of 17,917 applications under the IBC 05 Scheme were received and processed. A total of 16,693 applicants were given leave to remain under the scheme and 1,119 were refused. It has been cited that Nigerian nationals made up 59% of applicants of the IBC 05 Scheme and 57% of successful applicants.

== Business and employment ==
A 2008 survey found that 86% of Nigerian respondents had been employed before migration to Ireland, while just 8% were full-time students. 27% had been self-employed, a much higher rate than other migrant groups surveyed. 25% had worked as managers and executives, 11% in business and commerce, 17% in local or central governments, 12% in health-related occupations, and 5% in personal services. Only 16% had a job offer in Ireland prior to arrival, about double the rate of Chinese respondents, but less than a third the rate of Indian or Lithuanian respondents. They are more likely than the other groups surveyed to find their employment through newspaper advertisements, rather than the internet or friends and family. About half of the survey respondents were employed at the time of the survey, with another 16% of men and 13% of women looking for work. Many work in personal services and childcare (positions such as care assistants, security guards, taxi drivers, waiters, or hotel staff). About half of Nigerian men and two-thirds of Nigerian women feel that their qualifications are fully recognised in their main job. Compared to other groups they have an intermediate level of income (majority reporting between €14,401 and €31,720). Fewer than 2% are employed in predominantly Irish working environments.

== Politics ==
Compared to other migrant groups (including fellow EU citizens), Nigerians have been noted for their involvement in electoral politics and community organisations. A 2008 survey found that 50% of Nigerian respondents were registered to vote, more than double the other recent migrant groups surveyed. 25% of the same survey group were again involved with trade unions, again far more than the other groups. Involvement in political and civic activity tends to be high among asylum seekers while they are awaiting the completion of the asylum process, but drops off afterwards.

== Organisations ==
There are many Nigerian organisations in Ireland. Most are affiliated with the Houston, Texas-based Nigerian Union Diaspora (NUD), which is the umbrella Non-Governmental Organization (NGO) for the economic and political empowerment of the people of Nigerian descent outside Nigeria. Community organisations established by Nigerians within Ireland include the Nigerian Association of Ireland and the Igbo Association of Ireland. Nigerian organisations are typically ethnic-specific (as in the Bini Community in Ireland and the Igbo Progressive Union) or local-specific (as in the Association of Nigerians in Galway). There is also an umbrella organisation, the Nigerian Association Network in Ireland. Nigerians are also active in pan-African organisations and general migrant organisations. Arambe Theater Productions, a pan-African drama group, was established in 2003 by Nigerian performance artist Bisi Adigun. There is also Nigerian Carnival Ireland (NCI), an annual festival to celebrate Nigerian & other ethnic cultures in Ireland, established in 2010 by Nigerian TV personality & consummate speaker Yemi Adenuga. A Nigerian-run beauty pageant, The Most Beautiful African Girl is also in Ireland. Some Nigerian churches have been established in various places in Ireland, along with various Nigerian-owned shops and restaurants, especially in Dublin's Moore Street. The Association of Nigerian Doctors in Ireland (ANDI) was inaugurated in a dinner on 6 June 2015.

Nigerians have also established several magazines such as Bold & Beautiful and Xclusive. Nigerian television stations are available through satellite providers such as Africa Independent Television and BEN Television.

== Language ==
Yoruba and Igbo were the most common spoken languages by the Nigerian community in Ireland. According to the Irish population and housing census of 2011, 10,093 people spoke Yoruba at home, making it the most widely spoken African language in the country, while 3,875 spoke Igbo. Other Nigerian languages were not specified.

In contrast to other migrant groups surveyed, Nigerians have a high level of English usage in almost all kinds of interactions, including with children, with other Nigerian friends, in other socialisation, and at work; only communication with partners was an exception to this trend. 95% rate themselves as having "fluent" or "adequate" command of English. However, they are strongly likely to feel that they do not have many values in common with Irish people.

== Other ==
In a 2008 survey, about one-third of Nigerian respondents were in education on a part-time or full-time basis, mostly at tertiary institutions. As non EU citizens they pay a higher rate of tuition fees. The same survey found that 90% of Nigerian respondents had made use of health services in Ireland (such as GPs, hospitals, community health centres, medical cards, and private insurance providers), a much higher rate than the other groups surveyed (Chinese, Indians, and Lithuanians (EU citizen), ranging from 40% to 60%).

== Bibliography ==
- Komolafe, Julius (September 2002), "Searching for Fortune: The Geographical Process of Nigerian Migration to Dublin, Ireland", Ìrìnkèrindò: A Journal of African Migration, 1, ISSN 1540-7497
- McFadyen, Colleen, ed. (2008), Getting on From Migration to Integration: Chinese, Indian, Lithuanian, and Nigerian migrants' experiences in Ireland (PDF), Immigrant Council of Ireland, ISBN 978-0-9545496-7-1, archived from the original (PDF) on 12 February 2025
- McIvor, Charlotte (2008), "'I'm Black an' I'm Proud': Ruth Negga, Breakfast on Pluto, and Invisible Irelands" (PDF), In Visible Culture (13): 22–36
- Mapping Exercise: Nigeria (PDF), Dublin: International Organization for Migration, November 2010
