= Fourth Mainland Bridge =

- Carries: Vehicular Traffic
- Locale: Lagos State, Nigeria

Characteristics
- Design: Dual carriageway
- Total length: 38,000 metres (125,000 ft)

History
- Constructed by: Messrs CCECC-CRCCIG Consortium
- Construction start: 2025?

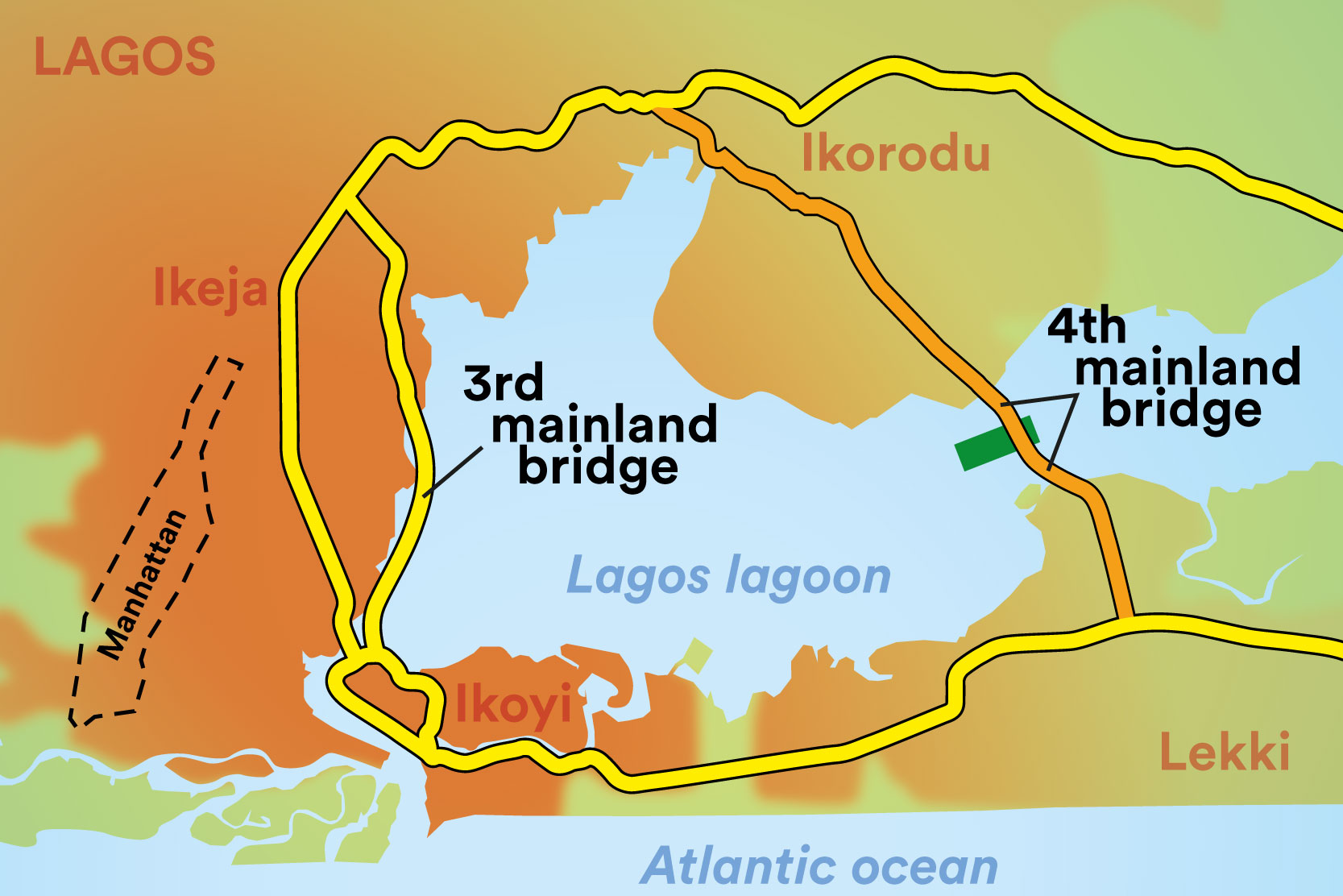
The 4th mainland bridge of Lagos (in comparison to the island of Manhattan)

The Fourth Mainland Bridge is a 38 km-long bridge project by the Government of Lagos State, Nigeria, connecting Lagos Island through Langbasa (Lekki) and Baiyeku (Ikorodu) across the Lagos Lagoon to Itamaga, in Ikorodu. The bridge is a 2 × 4 lane carriageway cross-sectional road with permission for BRT Lane and future road contractions. Upon completion, it is expected to become the second-longest bridge in Africa, featuring 3 toll plazas, 9 interchanges, a 4.5 km Lagoon Bridge, and an eco-friendly environment, amongst other added features. The idea was conceptualized by the government of Lagos State's former governor, Bola Tinubu. Construction was planned to commence in 2017, 50 years after the state's establishment and 26 years after the completion of the Third Mainland Bridge by the former military President Ibrahim Babangida. While it was initially expected to be completed by 2019, construction has still not started as of November 2023. The project was estimated to cost the state approximately ₦844 billion in the 2017 budget. In September 2020, the Lagos State Government proposed another sum of $2.2 billion for the construction. On the other hand, approximately 800 houses are expected to be demolished during the bridge's construction, significantly fewer than the 4,000 houses designated for demolition under the previous construction plan, which was realigned afterward. In April 2021, there were 6 bidders for the US$2.5 billion project. By December, the preferred bidder would be known.

In January 2022, the Lagos State Governor, Babajide Sanwo-Olu, publicly announced that three companies had reached the final stage, and the contract would be awarded in March 2022. He had earlier reiterated the plan by the state government to commence the construction on the Opebi-Mende link bridge and the 38-kilometre 4th mainland bridge: "Construction work on the 38km 4th Mainland Bridge — which will be the longest in Africa — and the Opebi-Mende link bridge will commence this year."

On December 29, 2022, the state government, through the Office of Public-Private Partnerships, announced Messrs CCECC-CRCCIG Consortium as the preferred bidder for the construction of the bridge. On November 8, 2023, the Lagos government announced a contractor had been chosen for the construction of the fourth bridge. The Fourth Mainland Bridge project is expected to be finished in four years, according to the Lagos State Government. The bridge, when completed, would become the second-longest in Africa with three toll plazas, nine interchanges, a 4.5-kilometre Lagoon Bridge, and an eco-friendly environment. The Government of Lagos State had held consultations with over 48 estates, traditional rulers, and others whose lives would be affected by the bridge.

It is also expected to span about 37 kilometers, starting from Abraham Adesanya in Ajah, on the Eti-Osa-Lekki-Epe corridor and traverse the North West towards the Lagoon shoreline of the Lagos-Ibadan Expressway via Owutu/Isawo in Ikorodu.

The new ("greenfield") tolled road will have a maximum speed limit of 120 km/h.
