= Nigerian Australians =

Total population
- 12,088 Nigerian-born (2022 Census)

Regions with significant populations
- Sydney, Melbourne

Languages
- English · Fulfulde · Hausa · Igbo · Yoruba · other Nigerian languages

Related ethnic groups
- African Australians, Beninese Australians, Nigerien Australians, Chadian Australians, Cameroonian Australians

Nigerian Australians are Australian citizens and residents of Nigerian origin or descent. The Nigerian-born form one of the fastest-growing migrant groups in Australia.

== Background ==
The Nigerian population in Australia has been increasing rapidly. The 2011 Census noted there are 4,519 Nigerian-born people in Australia. The population doubled since the previous census in 2006. The vast majority are skilled and educated, with 82.4% of the Nigerian-born aged 15 years and over possessing higher non-school qualifications, compared to 55.9% of the Australian population.

An NOIPolls survey found that 100% of Nigerians surveyed with relatives or friends living in Australia perceive Nigerians as having better living conditions in foreign countries. The only other continent with a similar response (of 100%) from Nigerians was South America.

=== Students ===
Students have become a rapidly growing source of Nigerian migrants to Australia. Nigeria is predicted to become one of the top 10 sources of international students for Australian universities. Australia’s streamlined visa processing for international students and its post-study work rights scheme have been given some credit for this. Many Nigerians come as engineering students planning to work in their country’s oil industry. Thus universities respected in engineering such as the University of NSW have seen massive growth in their Nigerian student numbers.

In 2015 it was noted that Nigerians are one of the newer student populations experiencing huge growth in Australia, comparable to student populations from Pakistan, India and Bangladesh.

== Population distribution ==
One third of Nigerians in Australia live in Sydney, and one quarter reside in Melbourne. Half of Australia’s Igbo-speakers live in Sydney. There are many thousands of speakers of Nigerian languages, particularly Igbo, and Yoruba

Nigerian cuisine can be found in restaurants in the more diverse Australian cities such as Sydney and Melbourne.

== Notable Nigerian Australians ==
- Francis Awaritefe – soccer player and TV commentator
- Liz Cambage – WNBA basketball player for the Las Vegas Aces (Nigerian father, but never lived in the country; born in London)
- Bernie Ibini-Isei – soccer player for Club Brugge
- Jamal Idris – rugby league player for Penrith Panthers
- Daine Laurie – rugby league player for Wests Tigers and Penrith Panthers
- Keiynan Lonsdale – actor and singer
- Ezi Magbegor – basketball player
- Jayden Okunbor – rugby league player for the Canterbury-Bankstown Bulldogs
- Jason Saab – rugby league player for the Manly-Warringah Sea Eagles
- Timomatic – singer
- Joel Wilkinson – Australian rules footballer for Gold Coast Football Club
- Ben Folami – soccer player for Adelaide United
- Sussan Ley – head of Liberal Party Australia
- Hugo Weaving – actor

== See also ==
- African Australians
- Nigerian diaspora
