= Ambulance (disambiguation) =

An ambulance is a vehicle designated for the transport of sick or injured people.

Ambulance may also refer to:

== Music ==
=== Performers ===
- Ambulance, a band with releases on the Planet Mu label
- Ambulance LTD, an American indie rock band
- Crispy Ambulance, an English post punk band
- Son, Ambulance, an American band

=== Albums ===
- Ambulance LTD (EP), by the band of the same name
- ...And the Ambulance Died in His Arms, by the band Coil
- The Artist in the Ambulance, by the band Thrice
- In a Priest Driven Ambulance, by the band The Flaming Lips

=== Songs ===
- "Ambulance", a 1997 song by Grinspoon, B-side to the single "Repeat"
- "Ambulance", a 2003 song by Blur from Think Tank
- "Ambulance", a 2004 song by TV on the Radio from Desperate Youth, Blood Thirsty Babes
- "Ambulance", a 2011 song by Eisley from The Valley
- "Ambulance", a 2012 song by My Chemical Romance from Conventional Weapons
- "Ambulance", a 2023 song by Theory of a Deadman from Dinosaur
- "Ambulances", a 2011 song by Ladytron from Gravity the Seducer

== Ambulance services ==
- St John Ambulance
- NHS ambulance services

== Other media ==
- Ambulance (2005 film), a 2005 film
- Ambulance (2022 film), a 2022 film
- Ambulance (TV programme), a British documentary television programme
- Ambulance (video game), released in 1983
- The Ambulance, a 1990 film
- "Ambulances", a 1961 poem by Philip Larkin
- My Ambulance, a 2019 Thai drama series
- Ambulance Ship, a 1979 science fiction short story collection
- Ambulance Girl, a 2005 film

== Other uses ==
- Ambulance (computer virus), infecting the DOS operating system
- Kabul ambulance bombing, a 2018 bombing
- Ankang-class ambulance craft, a class of navy ship
- Indian Ambulance Corps
- Motorcycle ambulance
- Ambulance bus
- Water ambulance
- Rail ambulance
- Bariatric ambulance
- Ambulance chasing, a legal term
- 1989–1990 British ambulance strike
- NHIF Ambulance Scandal
- Chief ambulance officer
- Shewa Robit ambulance massacre
- Air Ambulance Show
- Al-Shifa ambulance airstrike
- Tree Ambulance

== See also ==
- Ambulance station
- Ambies, a podcast award, singularly known as 'Ambie'
- Field Ambulance, a wartime mobile medical unit
- First Call vehicle, known as a "private ambulance" in the UK
- History of the ambulance
