= Chaffa Gola Dewerahmedo =

District in Oromia zone of Amhara Region, Ethiopia

Coordinates: 11°00′N 39°45′E

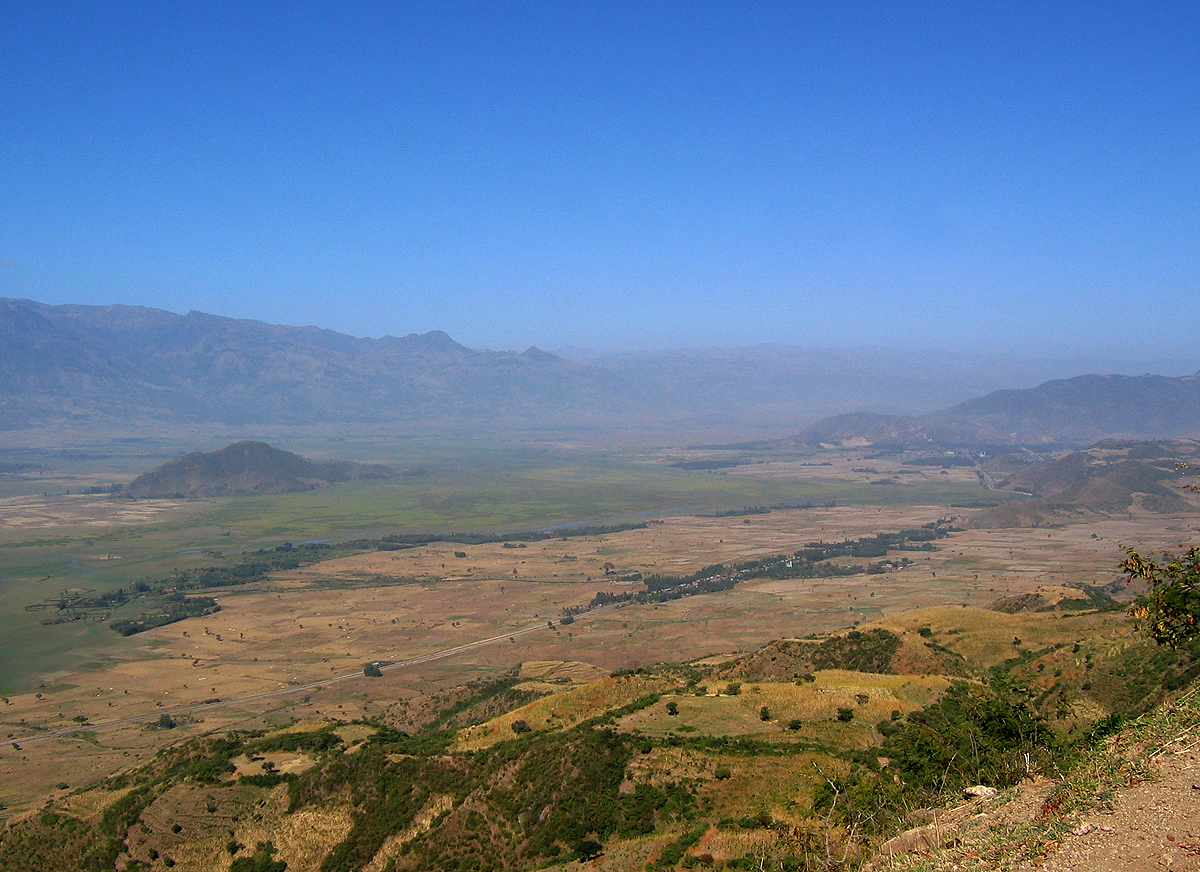
The Chaffa Valley, Kamisee on the right side in the background and the Borkenna River in the middle.

Chaffa Gola Dewerahmedo ("Chaffa Gola and Dewerahmedo") was a woreda in the Amhara Region of Ethiopia. Part of the Oromia Zone, Chaffa Gola Dewerahmedo was bordered on the south by Artuma Fursi Jilee, on the southwest by the Semien Shewa Zone, on the west by the Debub Wollo Zone, on the north by Baati, and on the east by the Afar Region. Towns in Chaffa Gola Dewerahmedo included Bora and Kamisee; the villages of Shonke and T’ollaha were also located in this woreda, and notable as being communities where the Argobba language is spoken. Chaffa Gola Dewerahmedo was divided for Dawa Chaffa and Dawa Harewa woredas and Kamisee town.

Elevations in Chaffa Gola Dewerahmedo range between 1000 and 2000 meters above sea level. The paved highway connecting Addis Ababa with towns as far north as Adigrat passes through this woreda. Notable rivers include the Borkana, whose swampy valley is used as a grazing area for about 100,000 cattle, 60,000 of which come from outside of the Oromia Zone.

== Demographics ==
Based on figures published by the Central Statistical Agency in 2005, this woreda has an estimated total population of 226,523, of whom 112,732 are men and 113,791 are women; 9.28% or 21,031 of its population are urban dwellers, which is less than the Zone average of 10.8%. With an estimated area of 1,212.03 square kilometers, Chaffa Gola Dewerahmedo has an estimated population density of 186.9 people per square kilometer, which is greater than the Zone average of 144.12.

The 1994 national census reported a total population for this woreda of 164,622 in 82,342 households, of whom 82,280 were men and 86,081 were women; 12,044 or 7.32% of its population were urban dwellers. The three largest ethnic groups reported in Chaffa Gola Dewerahmedo were the Oromo (67.29%), the Amhara (27.99%), and the Argobba (4.35%); all other ethnic groups made up 0.37% of the population. Oromiffa was spoken as a first language by 66.37%, 32.55% spoke Amharic, and 0.85% spoke Argobba; the remaining 0.23% spoke all other primary languages reported. The majority of the inhabitants were Muslim, with 96.9% reporting that as their religion, while 2.95% observed Ethiopian Orthodox Christianity.
