= Bati =

Bati or Baati may refer to:

- Bati language (Cameroon), a Southern Bantoid language spoken in Cameroon
- Bati language (Indonesia), a Austronesian language spoken in Cameroon
- Bati people, an ethnic group in Indonesia
- Bati (Fiji), traditional Fijian warriors
  - The Fiji national rugby league team
- The town of Baati, Ethiopia
  - Baati (woreda)
- Bati District, a district of Takeo Province, Cambodia
- The wattle-eye, or puffback flycatcher, a small, stout passerine bird of the African tropics
- One of the Bamileke ethnic groups of Cameroon
- Baati, a type of bread popular in western India
- Luca Bati, an Italian Baroque composer and music teacher
