= Wollo Oromo =

Oromo subgroup of northern Ethiopia

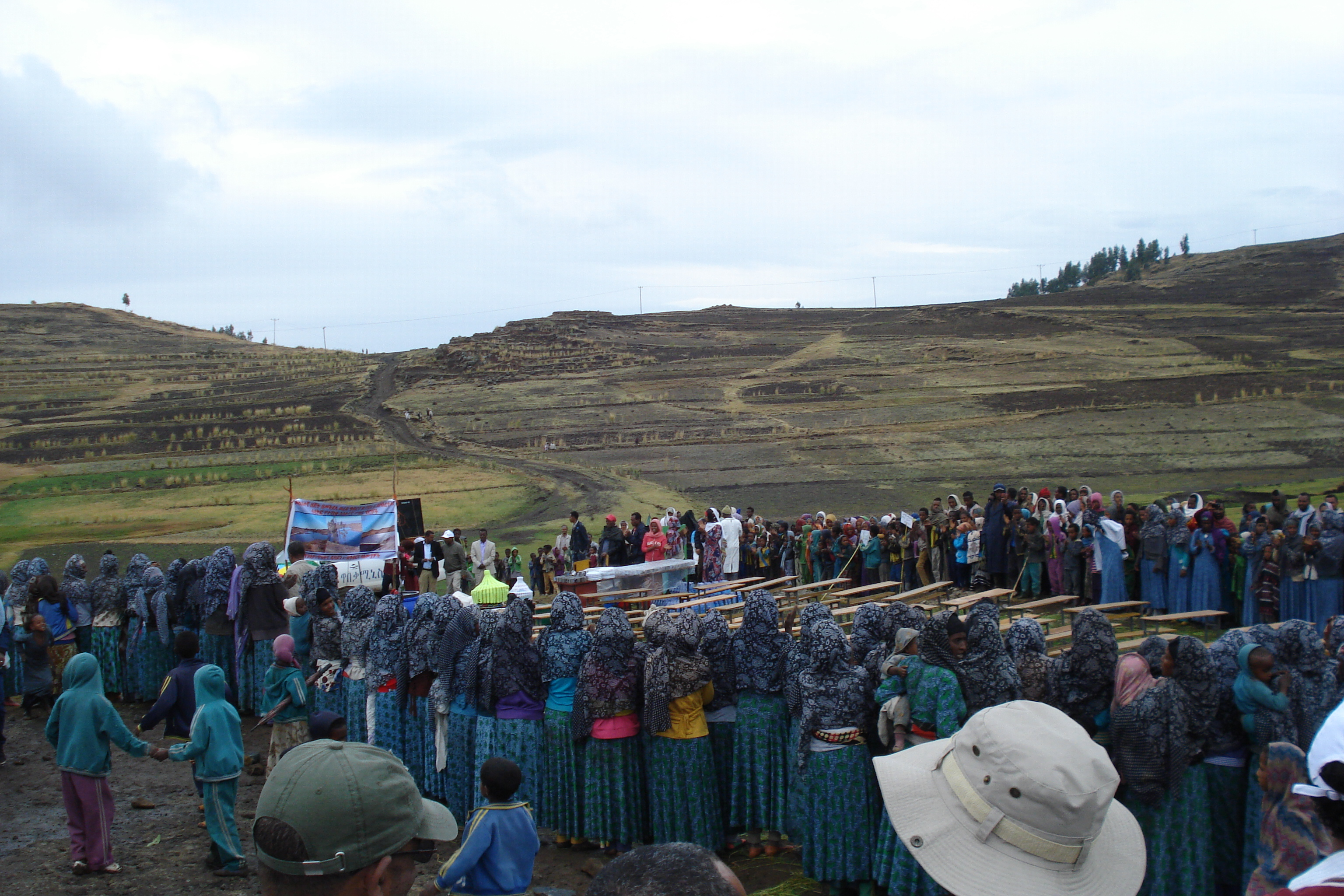
Field level reception of Wollo people during visit to watershed works, 2007

The Wollo Oromo people are an Oromo subgroup inhabiting the historic Wollo Province of northern Ethiopia.

== Language ==
The Wollo Oromo speak an Oromo dialect. However, linguistic descriptions of the Wollo and nearby Raya Oromo areas are still lacking.

== Alleged attacks on Wollo Oromo people ==
According to Hassan Hadiya, a resident of Kemise, the conflict started between Wollo Oromo people and Amhara Special Forces after Amhara Special Forces killed an individual at the entrances of the grand mosque in Ataye, Oromia zone of Amhara region. Ahmed says the Amhara Special Forces are attacking civilians and ongoing a blazing movement. eyewitness evidence blames the Amhara regional special forces while the Amhara regional government accuses both OLF-Shene and Tigray People's Liberation Front as a scapegoat of the violence.

Two Members of the Ethiopian parliament accused the Liyu police for killing Oromo civilians in Ataye, Oromia zone by labeling them what he called "bread name" which refers to OLF. "Amhara Militia used OLF-Shane as a pretext to commit war crime on Oromo farmers in Wollo for the three major reasons the MP said on 11th Session of parliament of Ethiopia.

== See also ==
- List of Oromo subgroups and clans
- Oromia Zone
