= Shonke =

Village in Ethiopia

- Village
- Location with in Ethiopia
- Coordinates: 10°37′5″N 39°58′23″E
- Country: Ethiopia
- Region: Amhara
- Zone: Oromiya Zone
- District: Dawa Chefa
- Elevation: 1,600 m (5,200 ft)
- Time zone: GMT +3

Shonke (Amharic: ሾንኬ) is an Argobba village located some 23 km away from Kemise town, in Jirota kebele, in the current administrative district of Dawa Chefe, Oromia Zone of Amhara Region, Ethiopia. The village was part of former Chefe Golana Dewerahmedo Wereda of the same Zone and was also part of southeast Wollo Province, in the Pre-1992's administrative division.

It was one of the 19th century Islamic education and sufi-order centers where notable sufi saint-scholars like Shaykh Jawhar b. Haydar b. ‘Ali (c. 1837–1937) were permanently settled and taught many Muslim scholars .
