= Artuma Fursi Jilee =

District in Amhara Region, Ethiopia

Coordinates: 10°30′N 39°50′E

Artuma Fursi Jilee is a woreda located in the Oromia Zone of the Amhara region of Ethiopia. Artuma Fursi Jilee was bordered on the west by the North Shewa Zone, on the north by Chaffa Gola Dewerahmedo, and on the east by the Afar Region. Towns in Artuma Fursi Jilee included Adebela, Chefa Robit, Kichicho and Senbete. Artuma Fursi Jilee was divided into Artuma Fursi and Jilee Dhummuugaa woredas.

Important rivers in this woreda include the Borkana.

== Demographics ==
Based on figures published by the Central Statistical Agency in 2005, this woreda has an estimated total population of 209,858, of whom 104,520 are men and 105,338 are women; 14,403 or 6.86% of its population are urban dwellers, which is less than the zone average of 10.8%. With an estimated area of 1,871.56 square kilometers, Artuma Fursi Jilee had an estimated population density of 112.1 people per square kilometer, which is less than the zone average of 144.12.

The 1994 national census reported a total population for this woreda of 153,425 in 27,715 households, of whom 77,632 were men and 75,793 were women; 8,270 or 5.39% of its population were urban dwellers. The three largest ethnic groups reported in Artuma Fursi Jilee were the Oromo (78.68%), the Amhara (18.95%), and the Argobba (2.24%); all other ethnic groups made up 0.13% of the population. Oromiffa was spoken as a first language by 79.59%, and 20.31% spoke Amharic; the remaining 0.1% spoke all other primary languages reported. The majority of the inhabitants were Muslim, with 99.24% reporting that as their religion.
