= Dawe Harewa =

District in Oromia Zone, Amhara Region, Ethiopia

- Woreda
- Flag
- Interactive map of Dawe Harewa
- Zone: Oromia Zone
- Region: Amhara

Area
  - Total: 376.17 km^{2} (145.24 sq mi)

Population (2012 est.)
  - Total: 44,795
  - Density: 119.08/km^{2} (308.42/sq mi)

Dawe Harewa (Oromo: Dawwee Harawaa), or Dawa Harewa, is a district located in the Oromia Zone of the Amhara region of Ethiopia. Dawe Harewa (10.73°N 40.05°E) is bordered on the south by Artuma Fursi, on the west by Dawa Chaffa, on the northwest by the Argobba special woreda, on the northeast by Baati, and on the east by the Afar Region. Towns in Dawe Harewa include Bora. Dawe Harewa was part of former Chaffa Gola Dewerahmedo woreda.

== Demographics ==
A 2012 estimate puts the population at 44,795. This gives a population density of 119.08 people per square kilometer (308.42 people per square mile), given its area of 376.17 square kilometers (1321.59 square miles), lower than the Oromia Zone average of 144.19 people per square kilometer (373.39 people per square mile).

Based on the 2007 national census conducted by the Central Statistical Agency of Ethiopia (CSA), this woreda has a total population of 41,359, of whom 20,431 are men and 20,928 women; 1,706 or 4.13% are urban inhabitants. The majority of the inhabitants were Muslim, with 99.58% reporting that as their religion.
