= Shewa Robit ambulance massacre =

2021 ethnic cleansing in Amhara Region, Ethiopia

- Part of the OLA insurgency
- Location: Shewa Robit, Amhara Region, Ethiopia
- Date: 21 March 2021
- Target: Oromos
- Attack type: Murder
- Deaths: 12
- Injuries: 0
- Perpetrator: Fano militia (claimed)

On 21 March 2021, 12 Oromos were killed while in an ambulance riding through the town of Shewa Robit. Fano militia has been suspected as a perpetrator of an attack.

== Background ==
In the days leading up to the attack clashes between Amhara and Oromo militias in and around the towns of Ataye and Kamisee had left hundreds dead and thousands displaced.

== Attack ==
After fighting in the region around Ataye, a dozen of civilians that had been injured in the clashes were on their way to be taken to the much larger hospital, Yifat Hospital in Shewa Robit. The ambulance was stopped and 12 civilians were pulled from the ambulance and then beaten and stabbed to death. HRLHA's source identified suspects linked with Fano militia.

== Victims ==
List of victims that have been identified.

- Umarsha Umar Yusuf (45)
- Ahmed Aliyi Hassan (60)
- Hassan Ahmed Jilo (62)
- Sheh Umer Haji Hassan (40)
- Hassan Mohamed Haji (25)
- Mohamed Aliyi Umar (40)
- Abdushe Umar Baza (55)
- Adam Abdushe Umar (25)
- Mohamed Aliyi Hassen (30)
- Ismael Mohammed (35)
