= Dawa Chaffa =

Place in Oromia Zone, Amhara Region, Ethiopia

- Woreda
- Flag
- Interactive map of Dawa Chaffa
- Zone: Oromia Zone
- Region: Amhara

Area
  - Total: 3,470.04 km^{2} (1,339.79 sq mi)

Population (2012 est.)
  - Total: 500,267
  - Density: 144.17/km^{2} (373.39/sq mi)

Dawa Chaffa or Dawa Chefa is a district located in the Oromia Zone of the Amhara region of Ethiopia. Dawa Chaffa (10.82°N 39.81°E) is bordered on the south by Artuma Fursi, on the southwest by the Semien Shewa Zone, on the northwest by the Debub Wollo Zone, on the northeast by the Argobba special woreda, and on the east by Dawa Harewa. Towns in Dawa Cheffa include Welede. Dawa Chaffa was part of former Chaffa Gola Dewerahmedo woreda. The town of Kamisee is surrounded by Dawa Chaffa.

== Demographics ==
A 2012 estimate puts the population at 500,267. This gives a population density of 144.17 people per square kilometer (373.39 people per square mile), given its area of 3,470.04 square kilometers (1,339.79 square miles), nearly identical to the Oromia Zone average of 144.19 people per square kilometer (373.39 people per square mile).

Based on the 2007 national census conducted by the Central Statistical Agency of Ethiopia (CSA), this woreda has a total population of 133,388, of whom 66,746 are men and 66,642 women; 2,876 or 2.16% are urban inhabitants. The majority of the inhabitants were Muslim, with 98.73% reporting that as their religion, while 1.1% of the population said they practiced Ethiopian Orthodox Christianity.
