= 40th Infantry Division "Cacciatori d'Africa" =

40th Infantry Division "Cacciatori d’Africa"
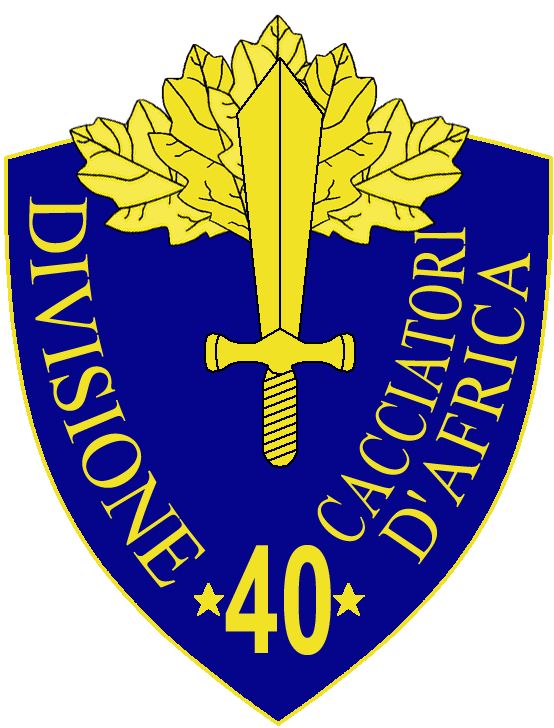
- 40th Infantry Division "Cacciatori d'Africa" insignia
- Active: 27 July 1940 – 15 May 1941
- Country: Kingdom of Italy
- Branch: Royal Italian Army
- Type: Infantry
- Size: Division
- Engagements: World War II; East African Campaign

Commanders
- Notable commanders: General Giovanni Varda

Insignia
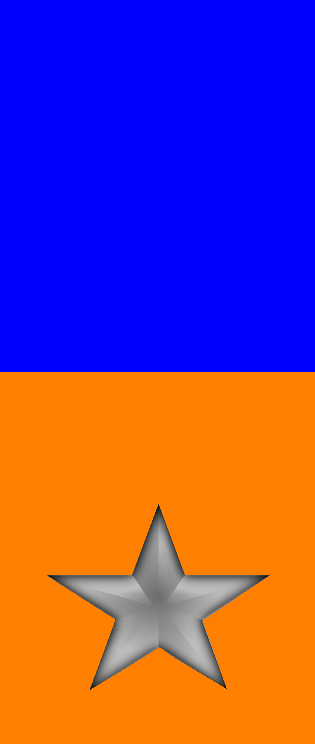
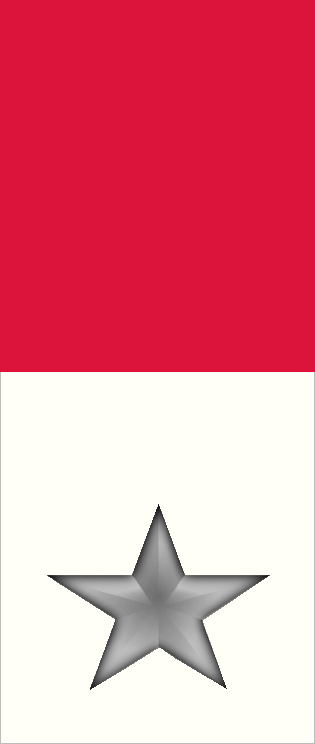
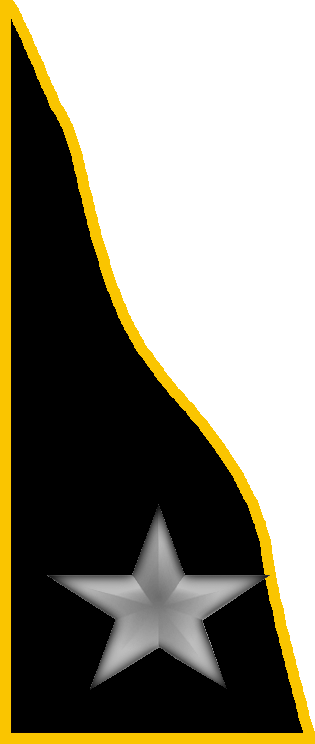
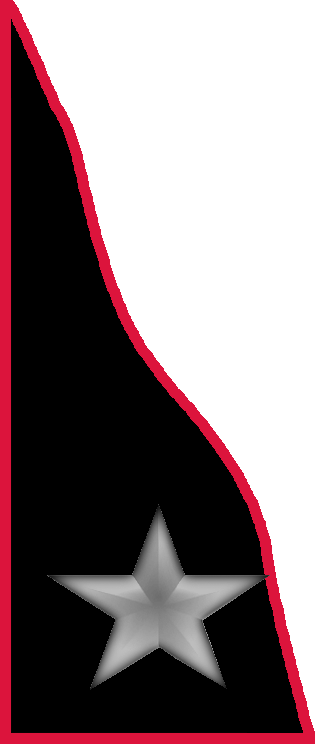
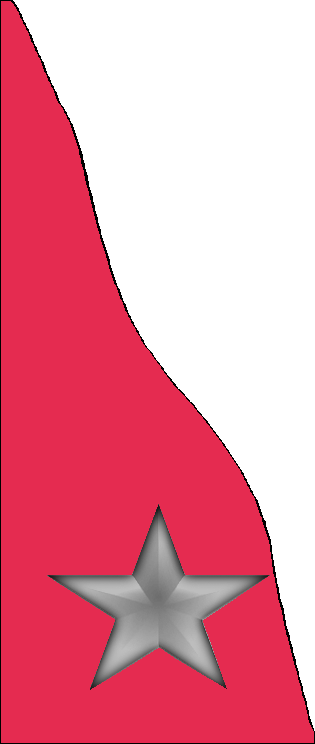
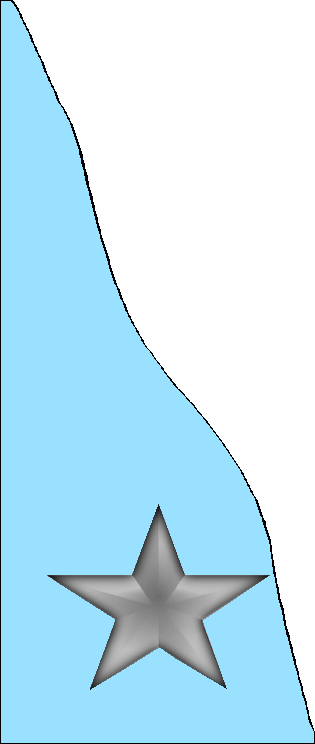
- Identification symbol: Cacciatori d'Africa Division gorget patches

The 40th Infantry Division "Cacciatori d’Africa" (Italian: 40ª Divisione di fanteria "Cacciatori d’Africa" - English: Hunters of Africa) was an infantry division of the Royal Italian Army during World War II. The Cacciatori d’Africa was formed on 27 July 1940 from troops and reservists stationed in Italian East Africa. The Cacciatori d’Africa, together with the 65th Infantry Division "Granatieri di Savoia" were outside the regular Royal Italian Army chain of command, and subordinated directly to Prince Amedeo, Duke of Aosta, the Viceroy of Italian East Africa. The division dissolved on 15 May 1941 after being decimated during the East African campaign.

== History ==
The 40th Infantry Division "Cacciatori d’Africa" was to be formed in case of mobilization in Italian East Africa, with personnel recalled from leave, local Italian residents, and materiel stored there. The Cacciatori d’Africa was to take the form of a standard Italian infantry division of two infantry regiments, each with three battalions, a blackshirt legion with three battalions, a field artillery regiment with three groups, and various divisional service units.

However, when the division was actually activated on 27 July 1940, it was unable to raise enough men and therefore never reached the planned organization: instead of nine infantry battalions it fielded only six, and instead of three artillery groups it managed to raise only one equipped with 65/17 infantry support guns.

=== World War II ===
From its formation on 27 July 1940 until the end of December 1940, the Cacciatori d’Africa were limited to defending the fortified walls of Addis Ababa. From January 1941, after the ranks of division grew due to recruitment, the division started to take additional positions outside the walls. After the disastrous Battle of Keren on 23 March 1941, the Cacciatori d’Africa transferred its 210th Infantry Regiment "Bisagno" and its artillery group to the 65th Infantry Division "Granatieri di Savoia". On 31 March 1941, the 211th Infantry Regiment "Pescara" was placed under direct command of the Italian East Africa High Command, and sent to Amba Alagi mountain. On the same day, the divisional headquarters moved to Dessie and the remaining units of Cacciatori d’Africa were distributed to various other units tasked with the defence of the line Danakil Depression-Amba Alagi-Addis Ababa and the division received colonial battalions as replacements for its two infantry regiments.

After Addis Ababa fell to British forces on 6 April 1941, the Cacciatori d’Africa took up a defensive positions at Kombolcha airbase and at Bati. On 17 April 1941 these defences came under attack by the 1st South African Brigade and Campbell's Scouts (Ethiopian irregulars led by a British officer). By 19 April 1941, the Italian defensive lines were in disarray due to airstrikes, allowing multiple sections to be overrun by British armoured forces on 19 to 21 April 1941. Increased shelling by British artillery forced a full abandonment of the 1st line of defences near Bati on 22 April 1941. On 25 April 1941 Kombolcha airbase fell, and Dessie was overrun on 26 April 1941, forcing the Cacciatori d’Africa divisional command to transfer to Bati and then immediately to Tendaho in the desert to the east. By 6 May 1941, the survivors of the Cacciatori d’Africa had retreated to Danakil to make a last stand. Pressure from the Ethiopian irregulars mounted in the period 7–15 May 1941, forcing the remaining Italian forces to flee to Assab, where they remained holed up until 10 June 1941. During 10–11 June 1941, all survivors of the Cacciatori d'Africa division were either killed or taken prisoner by Indian forces in Operation Chronometer.

=== 210th Infantry Regiment "Bisagno" ===
The Bisagno was sent to Āwash on 21 March 1941. It was then split on 1 April 1941: its I Battalion was sent to Dessie, ambushed by Ethiopian irregulars and annihilated on 7 April 1941. The regiment's II Battalion was sent to the south of Addis Ababa and reached Sidama Zone, where it came under command of the 25th Colonial Division. It continued to fight until it was destroyed on 22 May 1941 in the area of Sodo.

=== 211th Infantry Regiment "Pescara" ===
During fall of Dessie 26 April 1941 the Pescara manned positions at Kalaga, Ethiopia. Participating peripherally in the Battle of Amba Alagi on 4–19 May 1941, it surrendered together with other Italian units 19 May 1941.

== Organization ==
=== July 1940 ===
- 40th Infantry Division "Cacciatori d'Africa", in Addis Ababa
  - Headquarters
    - Command Company
    - Field Post Office
  - 210th Infantry Regiment "Bisagno", in Asmara
    - Command Company
    - 2 × Fusilier battalions
  - 211th Infantry Regiment "Pescara", in Addis Ababa
    - Command Company
    - 2 × Fusilier battalions
  - III African CC.NN. Battalion
  - XV African CC.NN. Battalion
  - I African Motorized Artillery Group (65/17 mod. 13 infantry support guns)
  - XVIII Mixed African Engineer Battalion
  - Medical Section
  - Supply Section
  - Transport Section

=== 17 April 1941 ===
- III CC.NN. Battalion
- XI CC.NN. Battalion
- XII CC.NN. Battalion
- XXXII Colonial Battalion Danakil
- XL Colonial Battalion of Gojjam
- LII Colonial Battalion of Gojjam
- Assab Garrison Battalion
- Royal Italian Navy Marines Battalion
- XI Colonial Dismounted Squadron
- XVIII Colonial Engineer Battalion
- 2 × batteries of 105/28 cannons
- 3 × batteries of 8 cm FK M. 5
- 3 × batteries of 76/40 Mod 1916 RM
- 2 × batteries of Skoda 75 mm Model 15
- 2 × batteries of Cannone da 75/46 C.A. modello 34

=== 6 May 1941 ===
- 2nd Colonial Coastal Battalion
- Royal Italian Air Force Motorized Battalion
- Royal Italian Navy Marines Company
- 4 × Camel Companies
- 1 × Artillery battery
- Auxiliaries of the Sultanate of Aussa

== Commanding officers ==
The division's commanding officers were:

- Generale di Divisione Giovanni Varda (27 July 1940 - 19 May 1941, POW)
