= 2021 Ataye clashes =

Ethnic violence in Amhara Region, Ethiopia

- Part of OLA insurgency
- Ataye (Ethiopia)
| Date | 18–31 March 2021; 16–18 April 2021 |
| Location | Ataye, Oromia Zone, Amhara Region, Ethiopia 10.3413°N 39.9581°E |

Belligerents
| OLA; Oromo militias | Amhara Special Forces; Amhara militias |

Casualties and losses
| 21+ killed, several captured (Amhara authority claim) | 14+ killed (witnesses) |
- 584 killed 566+ injured

The 2021 Ataye clashes were two episodes of large-scale ethnic violence killing hundreds in and around the Ethiopian town of Ataye, leading to nearly a quarter of the town being destroyed and hundreds of thousands displaced.

== Background ==
Clashes erupted in the region in April 2019, with the violence eventually being suppressed by ENDF troops.

== March clashes ==
On 18 March 2021, clashes broke out in the town of Ataye. The clashes started when Amhara special forces shot a person on the steps of the mosque in the town, then quickly spread with Oromo and Amhara militia taking up arms against each other. The clashes spread through the countryside and eventually reached the town of Kemise, where more damage was done. In one attack mobs of people attacked an ambulance in Shewa Robit coming from Ataye killing 12 people on 21 March. The clashes continued for 2 weeks leading to the deaths of 303 people and 269 people being injured as well as 1,539 homes being burned. 50,000 people were displaced during the fighting.

== April clashes ==
On 16 April, clashes erupted this time centered in the town of Ataye, where hundreds of people were killed. Suspected OLA forces wearing army uniforms would clash with Amhara regional forces leading to the death of at least 14 of them. Clashes continued and mass killings and door-to-door massacres were common. By the end of the clashes, about 281 people had been killed and 197 injured in Ataye. 3,073 buildings were destroyed, making up nearly a quarter of all houses in the town, and about 328,000 people were displaced due to the fighting.

== Reactions ==
Protests in Amhara were held in response to the ethnic clashes in Ataye and the targeting of Amhara people. Demonstrations broke out on 19 April, in Bahir Dar, Weldiya, Finote Selam, Dessie, Debre Berhan, and Debre Marqos.

== Relief efforts ==
With an estimated $32,700,000 USD in damage to the town of Ataye, the task of rebuilding is considered enormous. Humanitarian efforts began almost immediately with UNICEF and the Swedish International Development Cooperation Agency providing cash grants to people who lost their homes during the fighting. Priority was given to mothers, the elderly, and the disabled. People were given $35 USD for each member of their family. In total, $41,000 USD was given out to start the rebuilding process.
