= Jilee Dhummuugaa =

District in Oromiya-special zone of Amhara region of Ethiopia

Jilee Dhummuugaa Jile Timuga
- Woreda
- Flag
- Interactive map of Jilee Dhummuugaa
- Zone: Oromia Zone
- Region: Amhara

Area
  - Total: 617.35 km^{2} (238.36 sq mi)

Population (2012 est.)
  - Total: 79,252
  - Density: 128.37/km^{2} (332.49/sq mi)

Jile Tumuga (Oromo: Jiillee Dhummuugaa) or Jile Timuga is a district located in the Oromiya-Special Zone of the Amhara region of Ethiopia. Jile Tumuga (10.29°N 40°E) is bordered on the east and south by the Afar Region, on the west by the North shewa Zone, and on the north by Artuma Fursi. The administrative center of Jile Timuga woreda is Senbete town. During the 1994 census, Jile Timuga was part of the former Artuma Fursina Jile woreda.

This woreda derives its name from the Jile clan of Wollo Oromos who live there, and the Tumuga region in which its located. Prior to 1995, Jile Tumuga was administered jointly with Efratana Gidim woreda under the former Efrata & Jile woreda, which was the center of Yifat and Tumuga awrajja in Shewa province. Ataye town served as the capital of Yifat & Tumuga awrajja, as well as the Efrata-Jile woreda.

== Demographics ==
A 2012 estimate puts the population at 79,252. This gives a population density of 128.37 people per square kilometer (332.49 people per square mile), given its area of 617.35 square kilometers (238.36 square miles), higher than the Oromia Zone average of 144.19 people per square kilometer (373.39 people per square mile).

Based on the 2007 national census conducted by the Central Statistical Agency of Ethiopia (CSA), this woreda has a total population of 72,882, of whom 35,700 are men and 37,182 women; 5,075, 6.96% are urban inhabitants. The majority of the inhabitants were Muslim, with 98.83% reporting that as their religion.
