= Artuma Fursi =

Place in Oromia Zone, Amhara Region, Ethiopia

- Woreda
- Flag
- Interactive map of Artuma Fursi
- Zone: North Wollo
- Region: Amhara

Area
  - Total: 688.21 km^{2} (265.72 sq mi)

Population (2012 est.)
  - Total: 90,109
  - Density: 130.93/km^{2} (339.11/sq mi)

Artuma Fursi is a district located in the Oromia Zone of the Amhara region of Ethiopia. Artuma Fursi (10.55°N 39.93°E) is bordered on the south by Jilee Dhummuugaa, on the west by the Semien Shewa Zone, on the northwest by Dawa Chaffa, on the north by Dawa Harewa, and on the east by the Afar Region. Towns in Artuma Fursi include Chaffa Robit. Artuma Fursi was part of the former Artuma Fursi Jilee woreda.

== Demographics ==
A 2012 estimate puts the population at 90,109. This gives a population density of 130.93 people per square kilometer (339.11 people per square mile), given its area of 688.21 square kilometers (265.72 square miles), lower than the Oromia Zone average of 144.19 people per square kilometer (373.39 people per square mile).

Based on the 2007 national census conducted by the Central Statistical Agency of Ethiopia (CSA), this woreda has a total population of 82,842, of whom 40,938 are men and 41,904 women; 5,941 or 7.17% are urban inhabitants.

The majority of the inhabitants were Muslim, with 97.76% reporting that as their religion, while 1.81% of the population said they practiced Ethiopian Orthodox Christianity.
