= Jawhar bin Haydar bin ʽAli =

Shaykh Jawhar bin Hayder bin Ali شيج جوهر بن حيدر بن على
- Title: Shaykh

Personal life
- Born: c 1837 Danna, South Wollo, Ethiopia
- Died: 28 February 1937 Shonke, Ethhiopia
- Region: Ethiopia

Religious life
- Religion: Islam

Shaykh Jawhar Haydar ʽAli (or Jawhar bin Haydar bin ʽAli) was a mystic and Islamic scholar of Shonke, southeast Wollo, Ethiopia. He was usually referred to as the Shayk of Shonke, Shonkeyy and Abbayye (‘my father’).

Sudanese author Abd al-Aziz Abd al-Ghani Ibrahim marvelously described Shaykh Jawhar in his book, Ahl al-Bilal: Judhur al-islam al-ta’rikhiyya fi’l-habasha, as: "[Shaykh Jawhar was] one of the sources of pride for Abyssinia, one of the greatest scholars, a prominent [religious] leader, an exalted teacher, a possessor of the banner of knowledge, good works an exalted teacher asceticism, to whom the prominent men of the country traveled to obtain benefits from him”

== Early life ==
Shaykh Jawhar was born around 1837 at Danna, a village about 10km northwest of Kombolcha, South Wollo, Ethiopia. His parents, Hayder Ali and Misk al-Anbar, belonged to Illustrious and pious Muslim chiefly family. His uncle was al-Shaykh Sayid Aman of Gissir, a well-known Shafi jurist.

== Education ==
He got Islamic education from different scholars like: Shaykh Bushra of Karbana, Mohammed Shaykh, Muhammed of Ifat and Khalil of Mofa in Dawway

== Sufi-Order ==
Shaykh Jawhar was initiated into Qadiri order by Shayk Jamal al-Din b. Muhammad al-Anni and into Sammani order by Amir Husayn b. Abd al-Wahid, the grandson of famous Sudanese mystic Shaykh Ahmed al-Tayib b. al-Bashir.

== Influence ==
He trained countless disciples and influenced numerous adherents. Renowned graduates of His school include: Shaykh ‘Ali Sayid b. Yahya b. Bashir Dullati, Al-Hajj Ilyas b. Yusuf, Shaykh Dawud Walasma, Shaykh Al-Hajj Bashir, Shaykh Ahmed al-Busayri of Chiffata, Shaykh Abd al-Samad b. ‘Ali of Gaddo Chaffe, Shaykh al-Faqih Sa’id of Shabbat, Al-Hajj ‘Umar of Dawudo, Shaykh Adam of Qattataye in Warra Babbo, Shaykh Idris of Borana and so on.

== Legacy ==
Today, his mosque is known by the Muslim community as Shonkey's Mosque. A mosque is also built in Addis Ababa, around the French Embassy, for his commemoration.
