= Bati (woreda) =

Administrative subdivision of Ethiopia

Coordinates: 11°20′N 39°50′E

Bati ባቲ
- Woreda
- Flag
- Interactive map of Bati
- Zone: North Wollo
- Region: Amhara

Area
  - Total: 1,132.16 km^{2} (437.13 sq mi)

Population (2012 est.)
  - Total: 118,176
  - Density: 104.38/km^{2} (270.34/sq mi)

Bati (Oromo: Baatee; Amharic: ባቲ) is a district in the Oromia Zone of the Amhara region of Ethiopia. Bati is bordered on the south by Dawa Harewa, on the southeast by the Argobba special woreda, on the west and north by the Debub Wollo Zone, and on the east by the Afar Region. Towns in this woreda include its administrative center, the market town of Bati. The towns of Degan and Gerba were administratively part of Bati before the 2007 census but was then transferred to Kalu woreda.

A notable landmark of this woreda is the Aneba forest. These 53 hectares of woodland are one of the few remaining stands of Afrocarpus gracilior, an indigenous tree locally known as Zegba, in Ethiopia. At least one tree in this woodland, known as Aliyaw, is 700 years old.

== Demographics ==
A 2012 estimate puts the population at 118,176. This gives a population density of 104.38 people per square kilometer (270.34 people per square mile), given its area of 1132.16 square kilometers (437.13 square miles), lower than the Oromia Zone average of 144.19 people per square kilometer (373.39 people per square mile).

Based on the 2007 national census conducted by the Central Statistical Agency of Ethiopia (CSA), this woreda has a total population of 107,387, of whom 53,731 are men and 53,656 women; 16,710 or 15.56% are urban inhabitants. With an area of 1,132.16 square kilometers, Bati has a population density of 94.85, which is less than the Zone average of 131.78 persons per square kilometer. A total of 23,417 households were counted in this woreda, resulting in an average of 4.59 persons to a household, and 22,531 housing units.

The 1994 national census reported a total population for this woreda of 144,904 in 27,384 households, of whom 72,487 were men and 72,417 were women; 19,352 or 13.36% of its population were urban dwellers.

The two largest ethnic groups reported in Bati were the Amhara (49.72%), and the Oromo (48.98%); all other ethnic groups made up 1.3% of the population. Amharic was spoken as a first language by 51.08%, and 48.25% spoke Oromiffa; the remaining 0.67% spoke all other primary languages reported. The majority of the inhabitants in 1994 were Muslim, with 97.96% reporting that as their religion, while 1.99% observed Ethiopian Orthodox Christianity. By 2007 that had changed very little, with 96.06% reporting that as their religion, while 2.99% of the population said they practiced Ethiopian Orthodox Christianity.
