= Kemise =

Town in Amhara Region, Ethiopia

- Town
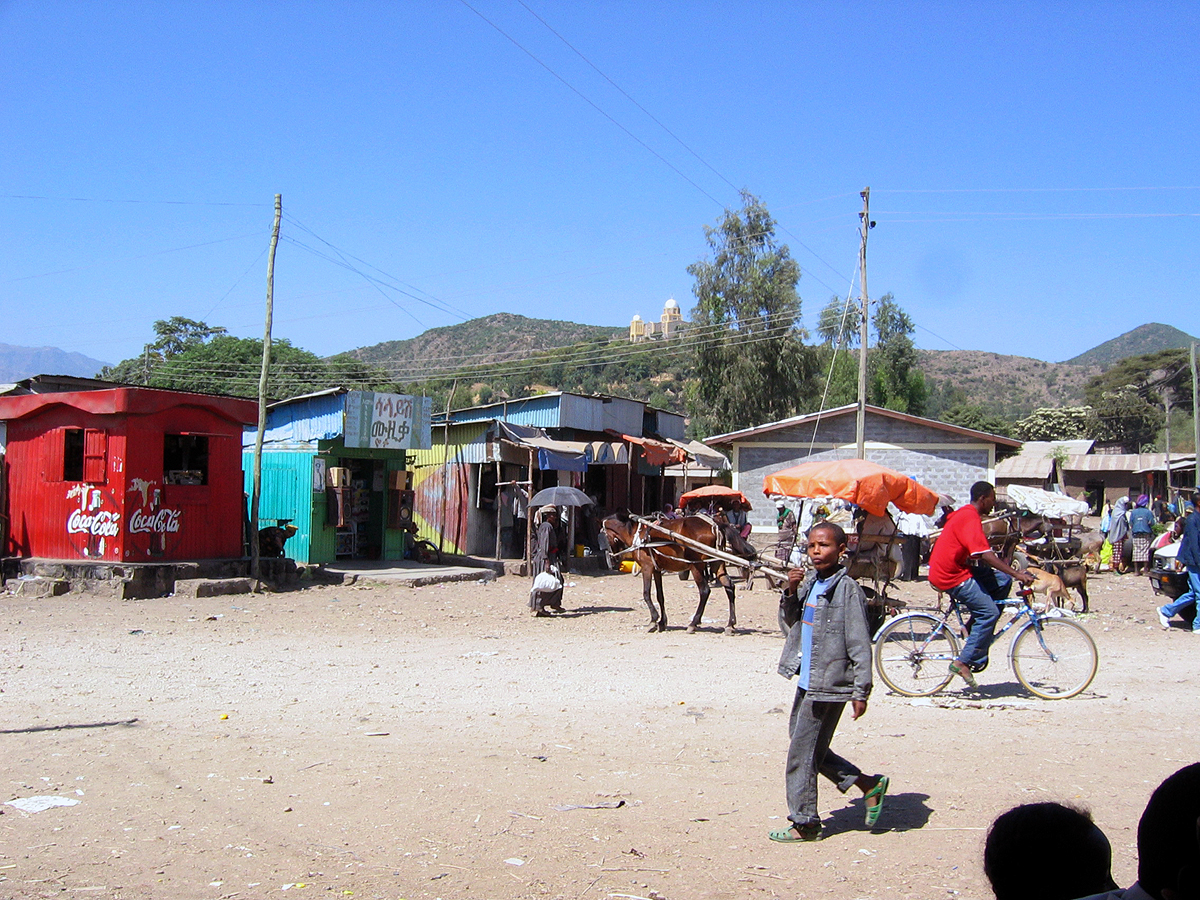
- View of shops in Kemise

- Location within Ethiopia
- Coordinates: 10°43′N 39°52′E
- Country: Ethiopia
- Region: Amhara
- Zone: Oromia Zone

Area
  - Total: 3.75 km^{2} (1.45 sq mi)
- Elevation: 1,424 m (4,672 ft)

Population (2007)
  - Total: 19,420
  - Estimate (2012): 23,864
  - Density: 5,180/km^{2} (13,400/sq mi)
- Time zone: UTC+3 (EAT)

Kemise (Oromo: Kamisee; Amharic: ከሚሴ) is a town and administrative seat of the Oromia Zone in the Amhara Region, Ethiopia. Kemise is 224 kilometres (139 mi) northeast of the Ethiopian capital, Addis Ababa and has a latitude and longitude of 10°43′N 39°52′E with an elevation of 1424 meters above sea level. It was part of the former Chaffa Gola Dewerahmedo district and is now surrounded by the Dawa Chaffa district.

== Overview ==
Around Kemise are three villages with mosques, reachable only by footpaths: Dewe Rahmedo, about 20 kilometers from Kemise; Shonke, 23 kilometers away; and about 12 kilometers south of Kemise there is a footpath to the east after another 5 kilometers arrives at Tiru Sina. There are allegedly Muslim monasteries for men and women around this town, with their members living in round huts distributed in the landscape, separated from each other in the same way as Christian monks and nuns.

On 19 January 2002 one person was killed during a clash between Muslims and Christians in Kemise. According to police reports, they arrested several persons for organizing the disruption or throwing rocks at the procession; however, all of those arrested subsequently were released. The person responsible for the death had not been identified by the year's end.

== Demographics ==
A 2012 estimate puts the population at 23,864. This gives a population density of 6,363.73 people per square kilometer (16,457.93 people per square mile), given its area of 3,422.90 square kilometers (16,457.93 square miles), an order of magnitude higher than the Oromia Zone average of 169.16 people per square kilometer (438.11 people per square mile).

Based on the 2007 national census conducted by the Central Statistical Agency of Ethiopia (CSA), this town has a total population of 19,420, of whom 9,782 are men and 9,638 women. This gives a population density of 5,180 people per square kilometer (13,400 people per square mile), given its area of 3.75 square kilometers (1.45 square miles), an order of magnitude higher than the Oromia Zone average of 104.96 people per square kilometer (271.84 people per square mile).

The majority of the inhabitants were Muslim, with 90% reporting that as their religion, while 10% of the population said they practiced Ethiopian Orthodox Christianity.

The 1994 census reported this town had a total population of 10,822 of whom 5341 were men and 5481 women.

== History ==
=== 21st century ===
Starting on 18 March 2021 clashes broke out in the town of Ataye after Amhara Special Forces shot a person at the steps of the main mosque in the city. From there clashes, riots, and pogroms perpetrated by Oromo militias spread throughout the Oromia Zone eventually making its way to the town of Kemise where extensive damage was done. The clashes finally ended on 31 March killing 303 people.

During the Tigray War, on 31 October 2021, the Oromo Liberation Army (OLA) said they captured Kemise, on the same day that the Tigray Defense Forces (TDF) also claimed to have captured Kombolcha, 53 km (33 miles) to the north.
