= Tree Ambulance =

Tree Ambulance is an initiative that has been initiated to support "save trees" with the “vision to save the Earth”. This initiative has been proposed by the Chennai-based environmentalist K Abdul Ghani, well known as the “Green Man of India”.

The initiative was launched for the purpose of providing a platform to battle climate change by replanting the trees that were uprooted due to Cyclone Vardah and Cyclone Gaja, which struck South India in November 2018. Tree Ambulance is also tasked to provide services such as “first aid treatment, seed banking, seed ball distribution, uprooted tree planting, plant distribution, aiding tree plantation, shifting trees, and surveying of trees and removal of dead trees”.

== First Phase ==
The first phase was flagged off and inaugurated in Chennai on the occasion of International Day for Biological Diversity on May 22, 2019, by the Vice President of India, Venkaiah Naidu. with the idea to save trees by caring for sick ones and helping bring back uprooted trees and protect the trees.

== Second phase ==
The second phase of Tree Ambulance was flagged off & launched by lieutenant governor of Puducherry & retired Indian Police Service officer Kiran Bedi.

== See also ==
- K Abdul Ghani
