= NHIF Ambulance Scandal =

The NHIF Ambulance Scandal is a scandal relating to irregularities in purchase of ambulances for the National Hospital Insurance Fund of Kenya in 2001.

The scandal resulted in the sacking of the Minister of Medical Services Amukowa Anangwe by President Daniel arap Moi.
