= Air Ambulance Show =

- Genre: Air show
- Dates: May
- Location: Hradec Králové
- Country: Czech Republic

Air Ambulance Show is an international fair of integrated emergency systems for professionals and general public. The fair takes place every year in May in Hradec Králové in the Czech Republic.

== See also ==
- Air ambulance
