= Bati, Ethiopia =

Bati Baati
- Location within Ethiopia Bati (Africa)
- Coordinates: 11°11′N 40°1′E
- Country: Ethiopia
- Region: Amhara Region
- Zone: Oromia Zone
- District: Bati
- Elevation: 1,502 m (4,928 ft)

Population (2005)
  - Total: 24,257 (est)
- Time zone: UTC+3 (EAT)

Bati (Oromo: Baati; Amharic: ባቲ) is a town in north-central Ethiopia. Located in the Oromia Zone of the Amhara Region, east of Dessie this town has a latitude and longitude of 11°11′N 40°1′E with an elevation of 1502 metres above sea level. It is the largest town in Bati woreda.

Bati is known for its market, located between the Ethiopian Highlands and the Great Rift Valley. According to Philip Briggs, this market "forms an important cultural crossroads for the Amhara, Oromo and semi-nomadic, desert-dwelling Afar people. Bati has hosted Ethiopia's largest cattle and camel market, attracting up to 20,000 people every Monday."

Based on figures from the Central Statistical Agency in 2005, Bati has an estimated total population of 24,257 of whom 12,229 are men and 11,958 are women. The 1994 census reported this town had a total population of 13,965 of whom 6,471 were men and 7,494 were women.

== History ==
=== 20th Century ===
Before the Italian invasion, most of a 100-kilometer road between Bati and Dessie had been completed. Telephone service reached Bati by 1956: the town had two telephones, for the police and for the residence of the Crown Prince. The town also had postal service well before that time.

The earliest mention of Bati is in the 1930s, but Paul B. Henze believed that the market "must antedate the town by at least 200 or 300 years." He adds, "I have been unable to find references of very early travellers to Bati, which may have had a different name in earlier times."

The town was the site of one of the refugee camps of the 1984-5 famine, which was closed at the end of 1986.
