= Argobba special woreda (Amhara) =

Argobba
- Special woreda
- Interactive map of Argobba
- Coordinates: 10°56′N 39°59′E
- Country: Ethiopia
- Region: Amhara
- Zone: South Wollo

Area
  - Total: 305.52 km^{2} (117.96 sq mi)

Population (2012 est.)
  - Total: 37,686

Argobba is one of the Districts of Ethiopia, or woredas, in the Amhara Region of Ethiopia. Because Argobba is not part of any Zone in the Amhara Region, it is considered a Special woreda, an administrative subdivision which is similar to an autonomous area. This woreda is named for the Argobba people, whose homeland lies in this district. Argobba is bordered on the west by the Debub Wollo Zone, and on the east and south by the Oromia Zone. Argobba was created mainly from Kalu woreda with smaller parts from Chefe Golana Dewerahmedo woreda.

== Demographics ==
Based on the 2007 Census conducted by the Central Statistical Agency of Ethiopia (CSA), this woreda has a total population of 34,998, of whom 17,710 are men and 17,288 women; none of the population were inhabitants. The two largest ethnic groups reported in Argobba were the Argobba (95.6%), and the Amhara (4.3%); all other ethnic groups made up 0.1% of the population. Amharic was spoken as a first language by 86.21%, 9.39% spoke Argobba language, and 4.31% spoke Oromiffa; the remaining 0.09% spoke all other primary languages reported. 96.62% were Muslim, and 3.31% of the population said they practiced Ethiopian Orthodox Christianity.
