= Ankang-class hospital ship =

Chinese naval auxiliary ship class

Class overview
- Name: Ankang
- Operators: People's Liberation Army Navy
- In commission: 2015-2018
- Completed: 5
- Active: 5

General characteristics
- Type: Hospital ship
- Length: 61 m (200 ft 2 in)
- Beam: 9 m (29 ft 6 in)
- Propulsion: 2 x diesels; driving two shafts

The Ankang class hospital ship, or ambulance ship, is a class of Chinese People's Liberation Army Navy (PLAN) auxiliary ship. "Ankang" is the NATO reporting name. Five ships were commissioned from 2015 to 2018.

== Ships of the class ==
Name	Builder	Launched	Commissioned	Fleet	Status
East Medic 12 (pinyin: Dong Yi 12)				East Sea Fleet	Active
East Medic 13 (pinyin: Dong Yi 13)				East Sea Fleet	Active
North Medic 01 (pinyin: Bei Yi 01)				North Sea Fleet	Active
South Medic 10 (pinyin: Nan Yi 01)				South Sea Fleet	Active
South Medic 11 (pinyin: Nan Yi 11)				South Sea Fleet	Active

== Sources ==
- Saunders, Stephan, ed. (2015). Jane's Fighting Ships 2015-2016. Jane's Information Group. ISBN 978-0710631435.
- Robinson, Jonathan (February 2025). "The PLA Navy's Hospital Ship Fleet: Concerns, Developments, and Future Prospects". China Maritime Report (45). China Maritime Studies Institute.
