= Chief ambulance officer =

Senior manager in some ambulance services

Chief ambulance officer (CAO) is a senior manager in some ambulance services. In the United Kingdom, it is the traditional title held by the chief of an NHS ambulance service or a private ambulance service. In Ireland's HSE National Ambulance Service, it refers to one of several senior management roles.

In the UK, the role is comparable to that of a chief constable within police forces or chief fire officer within fire services. CAOs are the operational and administrative heads of the ambulance service and take command of all ambulance personnel at large operational incidents. They also set policy and targets (along with a board of directors) and are responsible for the day-to-day running of the service.

The title of CAO is normally only used by medically qualified paramedics who have previously served on the frontline and have risen through the ranks. In recent times, several ambulance services have employed non-medically qualified managers in their most senior role. They hold the title of chief executive, rather than chief ambulance officer. Some ambulance services now only use the title of chief executive for their chief, regardless as to whether they have a frontline background. In this case, CEs with a medical background will still wear a uniform, whereas non-medical CEs do not.

NOTE: In the NHS Ambulance Service, chief ambulance officer is a redundant title, replaced, with the advent of NHS trusts, by chief executive, regardless of whether the holder has a professional ambulance background or not.
