= Ambulance (video game) =

1983 video game

- Box cover (courtesy of the Living Computer Museum)
- Publisher(s): Funware
- Designer(s): Kent Stevenson
- Platform(s): TI-99/4A
- Release: 1983
- Genre(s): Action

Ambulance is a video game written by Kent Stevenson for the TI-99/4A and released by Funware in 1983 in the United States.

== Gameplay ==
The object of the game is to pick up patients and race them to the hospital. There is a limited amount of time to deliver the patients to the hospital and you must avoid the different obstacles on different levels.
