= Ambulance (computer virus) =

Malware details
- Alias: RedX
- Type: Virus
- Isolation date: June,1990
- Origin: Germany

Technical details
- Platform: DOS
- Size: 796 bytes

Ambulance or Ambulance Car is a computer virus that infected computers running a DOS operating system in June 1990. It was discovered in Germany.

== Description ==
Animation of the payload

Ambulance does not become memory resident. It infects only one .COM file in any given directory, but not the first one. Thus, there must be at least two .COM files in a directory for it to spread.

When an infected file is executed, an ASCII art ambulance can be seen moving across the screen, a siren starts to sound, and it displays an alert message such as: BOOM! It is not a deliberately destructive virus; it simply spreads itself around and shows off its payload once in a while. In certain iterations of the virus, the ambulance will only appear once per boot-up.

== Variants ==
These are just some of many variants detected:

- Ambulance Car-B
- RedX-Any
- Ambulance.793
- Ambulance.793.A
- Ambulance.795
- Ambulance.796A
