= Shewa Robit =

Town in Amhara Region, Ethiopia

Shewa Robit (Amharic: ሸዋ ሮቢት)also known as Robi, Shah Robit, Shoa Robit or Robit is a town in north-central Ethiopia. Located in the North Shewa Zone of the Amhara Region, this town has a longitude and latitude of 10°00′N 39°54′E with an elevation of 1280 meters above sea level. Shewa Robit holds its market on Tuesdays. Ethiopia's largest prison is in this town.

== History ==
In May 2009, a group of rebels claiming to belong to the Ethiopian Unity and Justice Movement allegedly attacked the police station and other targets in Shewa Robit.

On 21 November 2021, Shewa Robit was claimed to be controlled by the Tigray Defence Forces and Oromo Liberation Army

On 1 December 2021, ENDF and Amhara Militias recaptured Shewa Robit after defeating the TDF and OLA in the area.

== Demographics ==
Based on figures from the Central Statistical Agency in 2005, Shewa Robit has an estimated total population of 24,886 of whom 13,021 were men and 11,865 were women. The 1994 census reported this town had a total population of 5,360 of whom 2,553 were men and 2,807 were women. The inhabitants include members of the Argobba people. It is the largest settlement in Kewet woreda.
