= Argobba language =

Semitic language spoken in northeastern Ethiopia

Argobba
- ዐርጎባ (Argobba)
- Native to: Ethiopia
- Ethnicity: Argobba
- Native speakers: 44,000 (2007 census)
- Language family: Afro-Asiatic: Semitic; West Semitic; South Semitic; Ethiopic; South; Transversal; Amharic–Argobba; Argobba
- Writing system: Geʽez script (In developing use)

Language codes
- ISO 639-3: agj
- Glottolog: argo1244
- ELP: Argobba

Argobba is an Ethiopian Semitic language spoken in several districts of Afar, Amhara, and Oromia regions of Ethiopia by the Argobba people. It belongs to the South Ethiopic languages subgroup, and is closely related to Amharic.

Writing in the mid-1960s, Edward Ullendorff noted that it "is disappearing rapidly in favour of Amharic, and only a few hundred elderly people are still able to speak it." Today, many Argobba in the Harari Region are shifting to the Oromo language. Those in the Ankober district speak the Amharic language.

== Phonology ==
=== Consonants ===
Depending on the Argobba variation, the number of consonants varies. In the Shonke and T‘ollaha variation there are 26 consonant phonemes, in the other variations there are 25. The additional consonants are the pharyngeal fricatives /ħ/ and /ʕ/ as well as the velar fricative /x/.

Argobba consists of 11 plosive consonant phonemes. All of them (except the voiceless postalveolar plosive can be placed in the initial, middle and final position of the word.

Consonants
		Labial	Alveolar	Palatal	Velar	Pharyngeal	Glottal
Plosive	Voiceless		t	t͡ʃ ⟨č⟩	k		ʔ
Plosive	Voiced	b	d	d͡ʒ ⟨ĵ⟩	g		
Plosive	Ejective		tʼ ⟨t‘⟩	t͡ʃʼ ⟨č‘⟩	kʼ ⟨k‘⟩		
Nasal		m	n	ɲ			
Trill			r				
Fricative	Voiceless	f	s	ʃ ⟨š⟩	x	ħ	h
Fricative	Voiced		z			ʕ	
Approximant		w	l	j ⟨y⟩			

=== Vowels ===
There are six vowel phonemes in Argobba and they are not differentiated in vowel length.

Vowels
	Front	Central	Back
Close	i	ɨ	u
Close-mid	e		o
Open-mid		ɜ	
Open		a	

The /ɜ/ functions as a default vowel for the creation of nominal and verbal formations and is used in many words.

The phoneme /a/ can stand in any position of the word and is related to the vowels /e/ and /o/.

The vowel /e/ can be placed in any position of the word, while it is rarely in the initial position.

The /i/ occurs in any position of the word, but there is a prefix added when it is in initial position. There are few words that start with the /e/.

The phoneme /u/ almost exclusively occurs in the central or the final position of the word.

The vowel /o/ has its roots in the diphthong aw and it can occur in any position of the word.

The /ɨ/ functions as an epenthetic vowel and aids to construct a phonotactically functioning syllable structure. It is a vowel without any specifications and is used solely to create a satisfying structural condition.

=== Syllable Structure ===
The syllable structure can be divided into onset, nucleus and coda. In a syllable there has to be at least a nucleus, the other parts are not mandatory. The Argobba language has five syllable types: V, VC, CV, CVC, and CVCC. V and VC are without an onset and a [ʔ] is added in initial position.

The syllable type CV is a consonant in onset position and a vocal in nucleus. Some words only consist of this syllable. Usually they occur together within more phonetically complex words.

The syllable type CVC consists of a consonant in onset, a vocal in nucleus and a consonant in coda.

CVCC on the other hand consists of a consonant in onset, a vocal in nucleus, and two consonants in coda. There are restrictions regarding the consonants in the coda position: for example the first consonant has to be a fricative, nasal or a liquid. The second consonant is always an occlusive, if this is not given the epenthetic vowel [ɨ] has to be added.

== Grammar ==
=== Morphology ===
Argobba is an agglutinative language, using suffixes and prefixes to change the meaning of the words. Sometimes in special cases infixes are used, but it occurs less often.

==== Cases ====
There are four different types of cases in Argobba; the nominative, accusative, genitive and oblique case. The cases differ in their usage and also the formation, especially in the addition of pre- or suffixed adpositions.

Case	Affix	Adposition	Example	Translation
Nominative	-	-	lɨĵu mɜčɨʔʔohall	“His son has come“
Accusative	-n -on (2.sg m/f)	to	lɨĵɨččin lɜʔaxɜyye	“Send the kid to me“
Genitive	-a -i (after ɨ)	from (+person)	amɜħammɜd lamɨtti	“Mohammed‘s cow“
Oblique: benefactive durative locative Instrumental temporal ablative causative comparative comitative	lɜ- lɜ- tɜ- bɜ- bɜ- ɨntɜ- sɨlɜ- ama- -kkul	for on with in (temp.) from about like with	lɜlɨĵɨyye lɜsamɨnt tɜmɜdɜw bɜħarb bɜt‘ʷaħ ɨntɜšɨritɨx sɨlɜwaĵib amabetɨčči mɜšorakkul	“For my child“ “for a week“ “on the podium“ “with a spear“ “in the morning“ “away from you“ “about the necessary“ “like the house“ “with the elderly”

==== Pronouns ====
It is differentiated between 4 groups of pronouns. There are demonstrative and interrogative pronouns as well as possessive markers for nouns. The pronouns that are used most and are most diverse are the free personal pronouns, which also differ between singular, plural, gender and case.

In general it can be noted, that the nominative case is the most neutral form of the free personal case and mostly also does not change the pronoun depending on the gender. In the accusative case the endings are different compared to the nominative case, but apart from the first person singular, the beginning of the word is the same. The pronouns in genitive are different compared to the other cases, but the most different is the oblique case, where all pronouns start with an “l“.

As a showing of respect, the personal pronoun of the third person plural in the nominative case ɨllɜm is used. It is also added as a congruence marking morpheme.

Personal Pronouns in cases
Person	Nominative	Accusative	Genitive	Oblique
1st sg.	an	ɨyyon	iyyo	liyyo
2. sg. m/f	ank / anč	axon / ašon	ax	lax / la
3. sg m/f	ɨwhat / ɨyyat	ɨwwaton / ɨyyaton	iwwat / iyyat	liwwat / liyyat
1st pl.	ɨnna	ɨnnan	inna	linna
2. pl.	ankum	axumɨn	axum	laxum
3. pl.	ɨllɜm	ɨllɜmɨn	illɜm	lillɜm

==== Verbal morphology ====
The semantic basic meaning of a verb in Argobba is usually expressed through a verb root that is made up of three root consonants which will be called radicals. Linguists are not entirely sure if there are only radicals in Argobba, or if the roots also consist of vowels in certain cases.

The construction of a verb is done through combining the radical with one other morpheme, which determines the way, order and amount of vowels in the context of the root morpheme, which is called a template.

A template consists of several vowels, that can be added in between and around the radical. In nominal morphology, templates are not as common and are only used to form deverbal nomina.

Another important aspect of the formation of verbs in Argobba are the bases. One verb can have several different bases, because depending on the conjugation, a different template is used. There are four main different conjugations: the perfective, imperfective, jussive and the converb. The main stem of the verb already consists of all the bases needed to conjugate. Usually there is one base for every verb for every conjugation.

Basis	Conjugation	Example	Translation
sɜbbɜr-	Perfective	sɜbbɜr-ew	“I broke“
-sɜbr-	Imperfective	ɨnnɜ-sɜbr	“We broke“
-sbɜr-	Jussive	yi-sbɜr-u	“They shall break“
sɜbɨrr	Converb	sɜbɨrr-o	“He breaks and …“

There is a difference between the main stem and an expanded stem. The expanded stems are the part that changes when conjugating and differs between the forms of conjugation. The main stem maintains the same and is the base for the expanded stem.

Some types of verbs use one base for several conjugations and for some verbs the base differs depending on an affirmative or negative form of the conjugation.

In the perfect- and converb conjugations they are formed by adding on suffixes. The imperfective and jussive conjugations are formed by adding a combination of pre- and suffixes. The verbal subjects are also formed by using a template and the radical.

==== Conjugation of the Perfective ====
The conjugation differs between the affirmative, negative and relative form. To achieve the negative Perfective a prefix has to be added onto the affirmative perfective conjugation. It is differentiated not by an extra word, but by adding a prefix or a suffix into the existing conjugation. In the following table the n- is standing for the negation marker, while the SUB stands for the subject congruence suffix which indicates what person it is about and is added onto the perfective base.

Affirmative			Perfectiv-base	+SUB	
Negative		N-	Perfectiv-base	+SUB	-N
Relative	REL	(N-)	Perfectiv-base	+SUB	

zɜrrɜʔ -ena
seed.PERF -1PL
“We sowed“ (affirmative perfectiv)

al- zɨrʔ -ena -m
N- seed.PERF -1PL -N
“We have not seeded“ (negative perfectiv, the n- showing the pre- and suffixed negative markers)

===== Conjugation of the Imperfective =====
The conjugation consists of a base and one or two subject congruence affixes. The subject congruence consists of a pre- and suffix. The prefixes vary in usage while the suffixes are predominantly used to indicate the plural or feminine form. There are also differences in the conjugation depending on if it is an affirmative, complex, negative or relative verb. The generic masculine is the standard, but in case there are predominantly women, a feminine marker is suffixed after the imperfective-base.

Affirmative			SUB	Imperfective-Base	PL/FEM	
Complex Imperfective			SUB	Imperfective-Base	PL/FEM	-AUX
Negative		N-	SUB	Imperfective-Base	PL/FEM	-N
Relative	REL-	(N-)	SUB	Imperfective-Base	PL/FEM	

ɨnn- ʔat
1PL- {to enter home}.IPFV
"We are going home and…" (imperfective, no plural or feminine markers, subject congruence marker)

===== Conjugation of the Converb =====
The conjugation consists of the converb-base and a subject congruence marker. It cannot be formed in a negative or relative form.

Converb-base	+SUB

===== Conjugation of the Jussive =====
It is formed with the jussive-base and a prefixed subject congruence marker and sometimes a plural or feminine marker is suffixed. The subject congruence affixes that are used in this conjugation are identical to those used in the imperfective conjugation.

It is used to create imperative phrases, while these are only suffixed, but all other forms are created with pre- and suffixes.

Imperative		SUB+	Jussive-Base	
Jussive		SUB+	Jussive-Base	+PL/FEM
Negative	N-	SUB+	Jussive-Base	+PL/FEM

Numerus

In Argobba it is differentiated between the singular, plural and transnumeral form of a noun. The unmarked form of a noun is in the singular or the transnumeral form, while the transnumeral form is used when the noun generally refers to an unknown number of things or people. The transnumeral formation is marked with sɜw.

The plural is demonstrated through a suffix on the noun, which can either be -ačč or just -čč. The -ačč is used when the noun ends on a consonant, the latter one is used when the noun ends on a vocal.

noun (consonant) lam (sg) lamačč (pl) (cow, cows)

noun (vocal) doro (sg) doročč (pl) chicken, chickens

Another possible formation is adding the number the noun refers to in front of the noun that is pluralized. In the example the ʕassɨr (ten) is the number the noun refers to.

ʕassɨr sɜwačč ɨntɜʔen tɜnšɨʔʔam

“Ten people set off from here…“

The plural form can also be used when the exact number of objects is not known, but it has to be a limited number, as when referring to a certain group of people that is known of in the context that it is in a specific range of number of people and not unlimited people.

==== Numbers ====
1	hand, handit (f)	20	miya, hayca
2	ket, häet	30	sasa
3	sost, socost	40	harba
4	arbit, harcät	50	hamsa
5	ammɘst, hammɘst	60	sɘlsa
6	sɘddest	70	säba
7	sacint	80	sämanya
8	Ssɘmmɘnt	90	zätäna
9	žähtwän, yähäten	100	mäto, bäqɘl
10	assɘr	200	ket mäto

==== Forming questions ====
In Argobba, questions are formed using different interrogative pronouns that are used to convey the different meaning of the questions. There are no different markers for yes-no questions and information questions.

Interrogative Pronoun	Meaning	Optional adposition	Meaning
ɨmbɜla	“what“	lɜ- intɜ- bɜ-	“for what“ “why“ “from what“ “with what“
man	“who“	-kkul innɜ-	“with whom“ “who“
et	“whose“/“which“	-yyu (m) -yya (f) tɜ- bɜ- intɜ-	“whose fem/masc…“ “where“ “on/in where“ “from where“
amet	“like which/what“ “how“		
mɜče	“when“		
mɨnĵe	“how much/many“		

The interrogative pronoun ɨmbɜla is used for questions that refer to a subject in a nominative sentence or to an object that is part of a verbal sentence. The short form ɨmb (what?) is often used when adding a prefix, but is also sometimes used on its own.

The interrogative pronoun man is used when asking for a subject or object in a verbal sentence or the subject of a nominative sentence. When asking for the direct object, the man carries two n to show the accusative marker. It also has a short form ma that is always used in combination with the prepositions. Man can also be used when asking for a group of people, but then it is usually used in combination with the prefix associative marker innɜ.

The interrogative pronoun et is used to help identify a reference, which can be done more clearly through the context and through adding prepositions. In combination with the prepositions it is used to ask for location or time.

The amet is a combination of the preposition ama (like) and et (which/what) which together is used to say “like what“ or paraphrased to “how“.

==== Adpositions ====
In Argobba, postpositions and adpositions are prominently used.

===== Prepositions =====
Prepositions have either 1 or 2 syllables and two allomorphems, that differ in the vocal in the end. When a preposition is added on a noun that starts in the epenthesevocal (ɨ) the preposition ends in “i“. When the prepositions are added on other nouns, all the other prepositions end on the vocal (ɜ) except for the preposition “ama“. When a preposition is added on a relative verb then the end vocal of the preposition is dropped.

tɜ- (can be translated with “in, on, by, at, to, from“)

The preposition tɜ is used in different contexts to show distinct relations and the exact meaning of the preposition is determined by the context. Often it shows a stationary location or a movement towards the location or towards a target. It consists of three allomorphemes which are determined by the word that it is prefixing. Only when it is added on a word that starts with a consonant, the tɜ is used entirely, otherwise it is changed to ti, when it is added on a word that starts with the ɨ, or the ɜ is dropped when in combination with a demonstrative noun.

lɜ- (can be translated with “for“)

In combination with a noun, it is used to mark the recipient of a verbal act. On the other hand, it is used in combination with a di-transitive verb when it takes on the role of a dative or a benefactive. It can also be used to show the goal or reason behind a verbal act. Sometimes it is used in temporal concepts when adding it on a nominative phrase that is showing a time frame or a point in time. In combination with the morpheme drɜs it is used to articulate a duration of a time frame.

bɜ- (can be translated with at, on, in, to, through (directionality) & with (instrumentality))

In many ways it is used similarly to the preposition tɜ-, it is also used when forming adpositional phrases that show locality and directionality. In addition to that, it also shows instrumentality, modality and causality. Usually it is added onto adverbs, postpositions or relational nouns that go after the noun they refer to. When speaking about a month, or a specific time frame, it can be added as well.

bɜhidarinna bɜtihsɜs (in November and December)

ɨntɜ-

It is often used to form adpositional phrases with ablative meaning, or to mark temporal and conditional phrases. It can also show the start of a movement and a reason for a situation. When used in a comparative-construct it is formed with the relational noun nɜh (amount)

ex. fat’uma ɨntɜħalima nɜħ amħɨr nɜčč (Fatuma is prettier than Halima)

ama-

It is also used to form adpositionalphrases that show modality or have a similative meaning and are adding into nominative phrases to dictate the standard comparison. When used with relative verbs ama is used to mark the complementative phrases, modal phrases and a certain type of temporal phrases. Requests are formed with the preposition ama- when it is a prefix to an imperfect form, that is portraying a negative or positive request.

sɨlɜ- (can be translated with because of / about)

It is used in the formation of adpositional phrases and it shows the focus of the conversation. It can also function in the formation of a causal sentence when it is used as a prefix to a relative verb.

sɨletɨmɨrt nɜyi (Is it because of the class?)

ɨstɜ-

The preposition ɨstɜ- is used to show distance in time and location when it is a prefix to a noun that is portraying the ending point of the said distance. In that case it is also usually used in combination with the postposition -drɜs. In some cases it can be translated with the world “including“ when attempting to make an inclusion statement.

===== Postpositions =====
drɜs (can be translated with until)

The postposition drɜs can be used in a local or temporal sense. It is used to portray a limit of the local distance or in the context of time the end of a time period. It is always used as a suffix to the noun that it refers to. Often it is utilized in combination with ɨstɜ- (until) or lɜ- (for) that are prefixed to the noun that they refer to. When talking about the exact moment (now), the preposition can be dropped.

-mɜss (can be translated with to seem / to be similar)

-mɜss is used to form complementary phrases and it is added after a verb that is in the form of the imperfect.

-nɜh (based on the noun that nɜh which means size or scope)

It is used as a noun and as a postposition that shows comparisons. The -nɜh is used as a postposition to the noun that is doing the comparison. Simultaneously, on the noun, that is the object of the comparison, is a added the preposition ɨntɜ- as a prefix.

-kkul

It is the only postposition that is a bound morpheme and can only be used in the formation of phrases of “together with x“. It can display names, people or pronouns.

ɨnana ɨllɜmɨkkul annɨtɨħawwɜk‘ɨm ɨmbɜr (We and they didn't know each other)

== Syntax ==
=== Phrases ===
In Argobba there are three different kinds of phrases; the nominal phrase, the verbal phrase and the adpositional phrase. They are all composed of a word that is the head of the sentence (syntactically and semantically) and other elements are added that are dependent on the head. The head carries the most important information and also indicates which phrase has to be used.

==== Nominal phrases ====
The head is usually a noun or a pronoun, and the phrase can be formed in an easy or a complex pattern. An easy nominal phrase consists of one element, while a complex one consists of a head and at least one more element and they add to the content of the phrase with more information. Nominal phrases are special because they can form syntactical functions like subjects and objects. Meanwhile, the head is placed last in the sentence and the modifying elements are placed before it.

An example of an easy structure would be the following:

wɜrbar nɜ -i
boy COP -3SG.M
"It is a boy" → also functioning as a copular phrase

An example of a complex structure:

It consists of a head noun and more modifying elements that can carry more grammatical or semantic information, such as demonstrative pronouns, adjectives, numerals, quantifier and relative phrases.

a- šonke sɜw
GEN- shonke man
"A man from shonke"

In a complex nominative phrase the elements are sorted in the following pattern:

(DEM)	Adjective numerals quantifier relative phrase	(-POS) (-ART)	Head noun	(-POS) (-ART)

==== Verbal phrase ====
This phrase consists of a verb and a compliment, where the verb is the head of the verbal phrase and sometimes a nominal argument is added. It is used to portray a situation, an occurrence or an action. In the case of a predication, the verbal phrase is the root of the predication.

The structure is less complex than the one of nominal phrases. It can consist of just a verb or a verb and its compliments. Usually they are intransitive and just consist of a complex main verb. When a verbal phrase is formed by using a transitive verb, then the direct object is part of the phrase.

sɜro -a -n ħat‘t‘ɜwɜčč
clothes -POS.3SG:F -ACC wash.PER.3SG:F
"She washed her clothes"

==== Adpositional phrase ====
This phrase is used to add to a predication with extra information and either consists of a combination of an adposition with a noun that it refers to, or they have a complex structure. The complex structure usually consists of three elements: adverbs, postpositions and a relational noun. These elements are supposed to add to the information that is known about the situation, which is usually about local, temporal or modal circumstances that are about the action in question.

The order of the phrase is the following:

Preposition	Reference noun	Adverb / relational noun / postposition

ɨntɜʔaro lɨʔla (over the gravel)
