= Argobba people =

Ethnic group in Ethiopia

Argobba
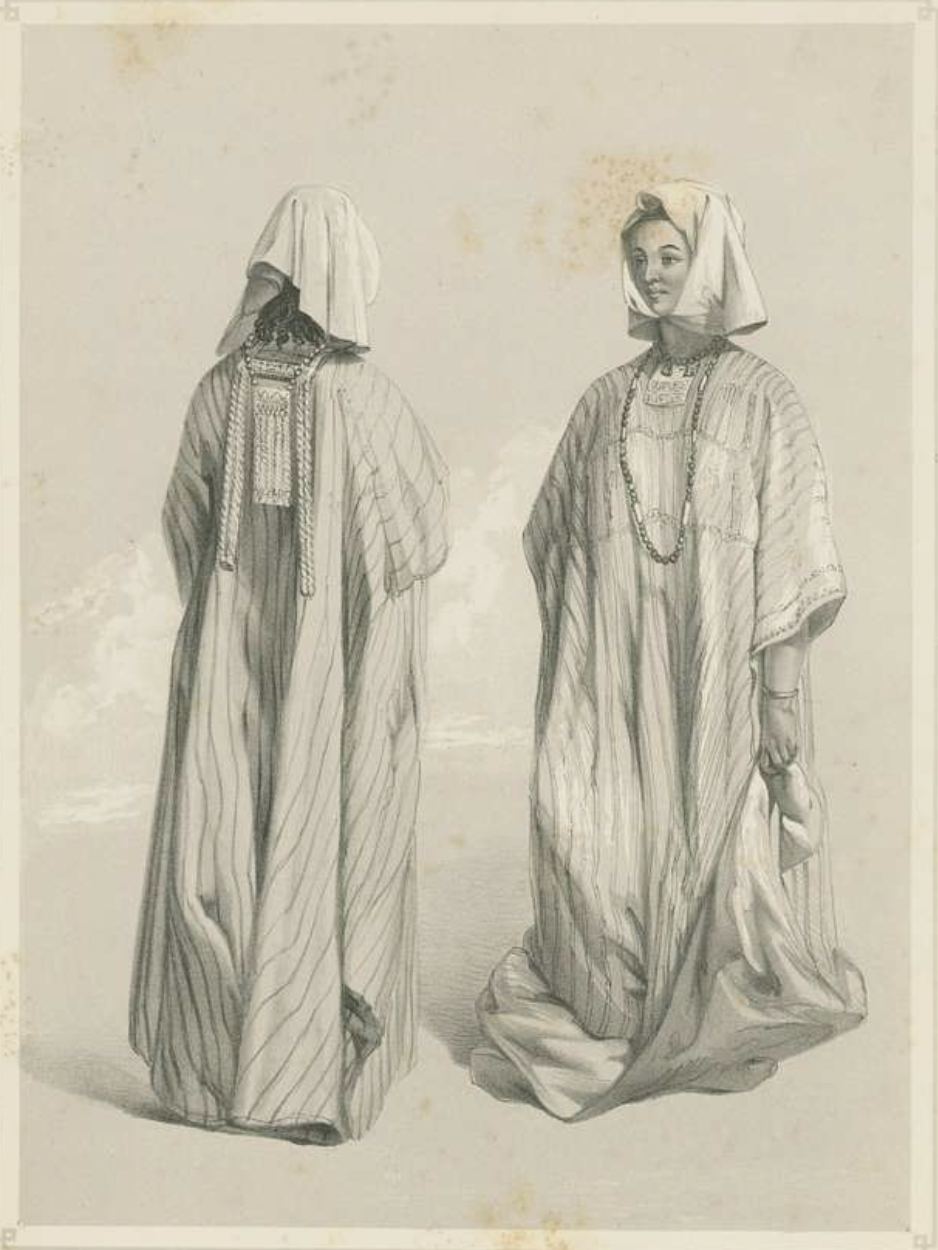
- An illustration of Argobba women by William Cornwallis Harris c. 1845

Total population
- 140,134 (2007 census)

Regions with significant populations
- Ethiopia

Languages
- Argobba, Amharic, Oromo, Harari, Arabic, Afar

Religion
- Sunni Islam

Related ethnic groups
- Amhara • Silte • Harari • Tigrayans • Tigrinya • Zay • other Ethiopian Semitic peoples

The Argobba are an ethnic group inhabiting Ethiopia. They are a Muslim community, and they spread out through isolated village networks and towns in the north-eastern and eastern parts of the country. Group members have typically been astute traders and merchants, and have adjusted to the economic trends in their area. These factors have led to a decline in usage of the Argobba language. Argobba are considered endangered today due to exogamy and destitution as well as ethnic cleansing by the Abyssinian state over the centuries.

== Etymology ==
According to traditional explanations the name Argobba is derived from the Amharic phrase Arab gebba, meaning "Arabs came". Aklilu Asfaw likewise recorded the explanation Arab geba, translated as "Arabs have entered".

== History ==
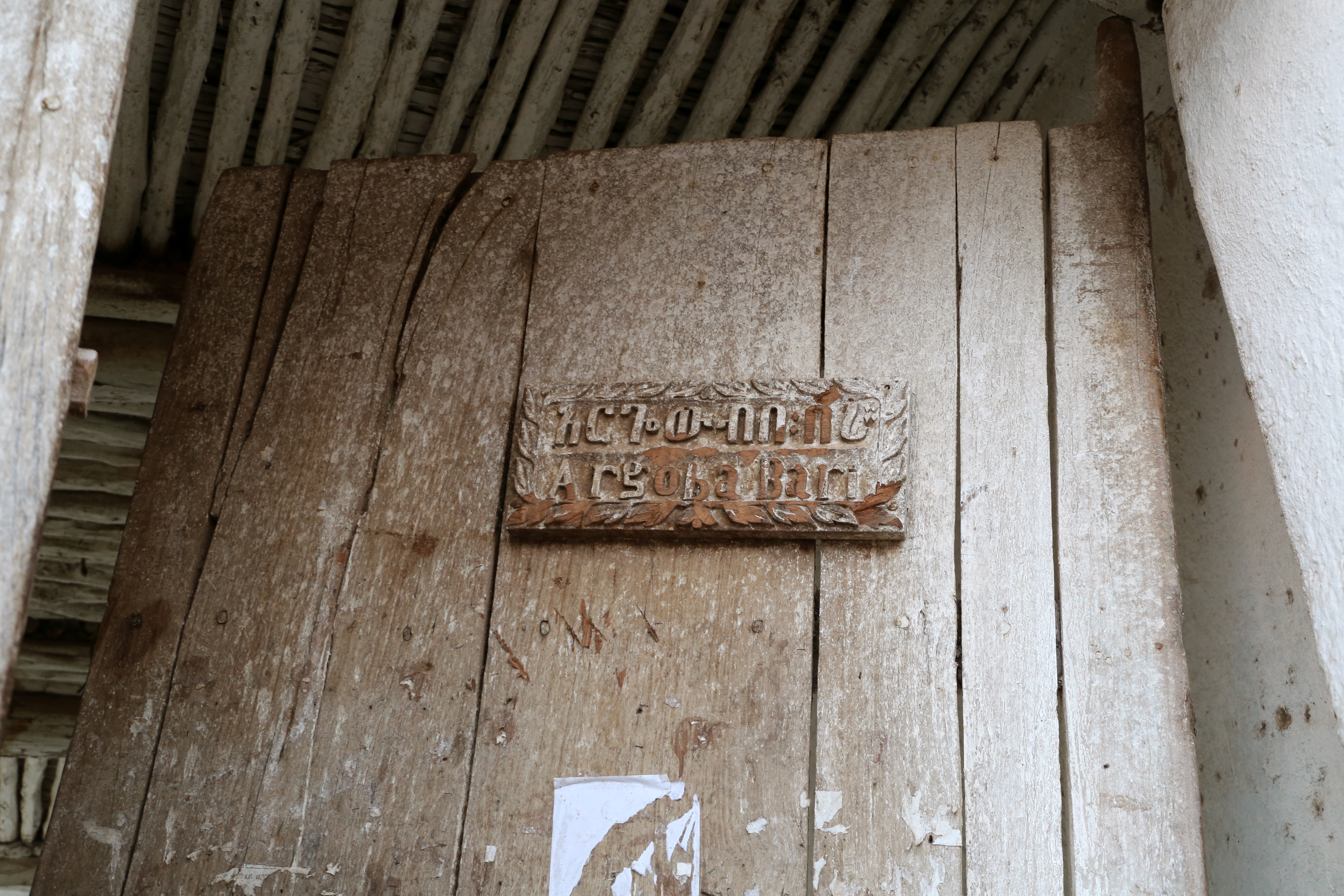
Main door of the Argoba gate of Harar named in honor of those who fled Ifat.

According to Girma Demeke, some time after the 9th century AD, the Argobba diverged from their closest relative, the Amharas, probably due to religious differences as the Argobba adopted Islam. Modern Argobba claim they originate from the Arabian Peninsula through Zeila in what is now Somaliland and before settling in Ifat. Argobba have historical links with Harari and Harla people. Argobba people consider the inhabitants of Doba their ancestors. Argobba settlements were typically located on hilltops and mountain retreats known as amba, where residences consist of stone-and-wood square houses or huts with earth and hay-thatched roofs. Each village has at least one mosque, a weaver’s workshop, a public square, a marketplace, and a zawiya for Qur'anic schooling.

After the collapse of Aksum, the southward shift of the Christian Ethiopian state saw the rise of the political importance of Ifat. Ifat became an economic powerhouse as it sat on the trade routes between Zeila and the interior hinterlands, developing significant ties to the Muslim world. The Argobba are associated with the Walashma dynasty of Ifat, which would become the rulers of the Sultanate of Ifat and Adal Sultanate. The existence of ancient ruins of villages, mosques, cemeteries, and an Argobba Muslim population territorial continuum suggests that Argobba settlements were once far more widespread than they are today. Due to the historical connection between the Argobba and the Wälašma dynasty, as well as the fortunes of the Muslim sultanates that flourished in northeastern Shewa between 1270 and 1415, evidence indicates that the present-day Argobba communities in Shewa and Wollo are remnants of the Sultanate of Ifat. According to Harari tradition numerous Argobba had fled Ifat and settled around Harar in the Aw Abdal lowlands during their conflict with Abyssinia in the fifteenth century, a gate was thus named after them called the gate of Argobba.

The Argobba and the Harla people seem to have relied on each other in the Islamic period. A power struggle erupted between the Abadir dynasty of Harari and the Walashma dynasty of Argobba throughout the Islamic period until Ahmad ibn Ibrahim al-Ghazi took control of Adal Sultanate by executing the Walashma sultan Abu Bakr ibn Muhammad in the 16th century.

Due to the wars between the Ifat Sultanate and Ethiopia, the region of Ifat was incorporated into Ethiopia having been an integral part of the empire for over a century since early medieval times. During this period of incorporation, large sections of the local Argobba population embraced Christianity. According to French explorer, Charles-Xavier Rochet d'Héricourt, who had visited the region of Ifat. He stated that in 1517, an invasion from a formidable force suddenly fell upon the eastern provinces of the Kingdom of Shewa. An army of Somalis and Hararis, led by a bold and fanatical chief named Ahmad ibn Ibrahim al-Ghazi, entered the province of Ifat-Argobba and had already forced the inhabitants to embrace Islam again.

In the late sixteenth century, Argobba were involved in several conflicts with the Oromo during the Oromo migrations, and due to the withdrawal of Adal from Ethiopia, came partially under Ethiopian Empire rule losing land rights.

The rise of the Kingdom of Shewa in the late 17th and 18th centuries paved the way for Amhara expansion into escarpment areas. Under Negus Sahle Selassie and his successors, Argobba homelands were incorporated into the growing Shewan kingdom in the 19th century. During this period, the erosion of Walashma authority and the Argobba regional economy was accelerated by state taxation and the gradual influx of Christian Amhara settlers from the highlands. The construction of the Djibouti–Addis Ababa railway in the early 20th century bypassed traditional trade routes through Argobba settlements, marginalizing and isolating these communities. The Argobba—who had long established commercial posts along these trade routes—faced further challenges as their escarpment slopes were increasingly threatened by the Afar who occasionally raided them. Due to expansions from two dominant ethnic groups, many Argobba speak either Amharic or Oromo in Wollo Province; however, those who self-identify as originally Argobba are substantial in the region. The last remaining villages of a once larger Argobba-speaking territory are Shonke and Ṭollaḥa.

In 1902 upon visiting an Argobba inhabited town in the Harari region, German traveler Oscar Neumann describes the people:

"It is remarkable that, in spite of their proximity to Harar, next to nothing was known of the interesting Argobba people and their old stone buildings. The remains of this probably once powerful nation dwell on the eastern slopes of the Hakim, a mountain ridge situated to the south of Harar. Their houses were built of stone, had high watchtowers in the centre, and were surrounded by strong walls; they are now mostly fallen into decay, and are only partly inhabited. The old ruins overlooking the Erer valley resemble medieval castles, and present a picturesque appearance. Scattered amongst them are the straw huts of the Ala Galla, who form the greater part of the population of today."

Under the new government of Ethiopia, the Ethiopian People's Revolutionary Democratic Front, ushered in the early 90s the Argobba obtained regional political power after launching Argoba Nationality Democratic Organization.

== Distribution ==
Argobba communities can be found in the Afar, Harari, Amhara, and Oromia Regions, in and along the Great Rift Valley. They include Yimlawo, Gusa, Shonke, Berehet, Khayr Amba, Melka Jilo, Aliyu Amba, Metehara, Shewa Robit, and the surrounding rural villages.

Abyssinian religious persecutions forced numerous Argobba to flee Ifat region in the 1800s, and migrate to the Emirate of Harar however the townsman were unwilling to accommodate them leading to Argobba people settling outside the walled city of Harar. Argobba suffered from stigma in Harar. Harari children believe that the Argobba are were-hyenas and chant at Argobba women as they come to town, "Argobba, Argobba, night-time hyena, day-time human". Urban legends regarding the Argobba exist among the Harari and Oromo in Harar region. It is said by them that the Argobba participate in cannibalism. However, historian Abdurahman Garad observes that a chronicle from the nineteenth century detailing the Emirate of Harar describes a marriage annulment involving a Malak and an Argobba lady, indicating substantial connections between the Argobba community near Harar and the Harari state.

== Religion ==
Argobba are exclusive adherents to the Muslim faith. They are also widely believed to be the first to accept Islam collectively, in the Horn of Africa and vanguards for early Islamic expansion. The Shonke Argobba reportedly forbid their children from attending school due to the possible non-Islamic influence it might have on them.

== Language ==
The Argobba traditionally speak Argobba, an Ethiopian Semitic language within the Afroasiatic language family. According to Getahun Amare, Argobba is not a dialect of Amharic as previous linguists believed, but a separate language. Argobba language evolved from proto Amharic and Argobba. In other areas, the people have shifted to neighboring languages for economic reasons. At this time there are only a few areas left where the Argobba are not at least bilingual in Amharic, Oromo or Afar.

== Notable Argobba ==
- Talha Jafar, nineteenth century rebel of Ifat

== See also ==
- Doba
- Argobba special woreda in the Afar Regon
- Argobba special woreda in the Amhara Regon
- Argoba Nationality Democratic Organization
