= Ataye =

Town in Ethiopia

- Town
- Interactive map of Ataye
- Country: Etiopia
- Region: Amara
- Zone: North Shewa Zone

Population
  - Total: 70,000
- Time zone: Eastern Standard Time

Ataye is a town and farming community in the North Shewa Zone in the Amhara region of Ethiopia. It has a population of about 70,000. The town is about 280 km from the capital. It is one of the major towns in Ethiopia.

== Geography ==
Ataye is located at an altitude of approximately 1,450m.

== Economy and infrastructure ==
The town's principal economy is farming.

It has a district hospital that was commissioned in 2013 with a health center.

== Ataye clashes ==
Since 2021, the area has experienced recurring ethnic violence known as the Ataye clashes, which have resulted in several deaths in the town.

== Climate ==
Ataye has a temperate to warm climate that is affected by the highlands.Yearly temperatures typically range from 15 °C to 27 °C (59 °F to 81 °F).

== See also ==
- Ataye River
- 2021 Ataye clashes
