= Oromia Zone =

Zone in Amhara Region of Ethiopia

Coordinates: 10°40′N 40°00′E

Oromia ኦሮሚያ ዞን
- Zone
- Flag
- Interactive map of Oromia
- Country: Ethiopia
- Region: Amhara
- Seat: Kemise

Area
  - Total: 3,470.04 km^{2} (1,339.79 sq mi)

Population (2012 est.)
  - Total: 500,267
  - Density: 144.19/km^{2} (373.5/sq mi)

A map of the regions and zones of Ethiopia

The Oromia Zone (Oromo: Godina Oromiyaa; Amharic: ኦሮሚያ ዞን) is a zone in Amhara Region of Ethiopia. Oromia is named for the Oromo people, who settled along the edge of the Ethiopian Highlands that form this Zone. Oromia Zone is bordered on the southwest by North Shewa Zone, on the northwest by South Wollo and Argobba special woreda, and on the east by the Afar Region. The Zone consists of 5 Woredas which are Artuma Fursi, Bati, Dewa Cheffa, Dewe Harewa, Jile Tumuga and Kemisie town. Kemise is the administrative center of the Zone.

The Oromia Zone was created in the late summer of 1994, according to one account in response to pressure from the Oromo Liberation Front, which was actively agitating for autonomy for Wollo Oromo during late 1991 and early 1992. Four woredas were taken from Debub Wollo—Baati, Dewe, Esseya Gulla and Artuma—and two woredas from Semien Shewa—Fursi and Senbete—and appointing Kamisee to be the Zonal capital. The new zone was organized into five woredas by combining Artuma and Fursi into one and renaming Esseya Gola to Chaffa Gola. The numbers and areas of the constituent Districts have since changed.

== Demographics ==
A 2012 estimate puts the population at 500,267. This gives a population density of 144.19 people per square kilometer (373.39 people per square mile), given its area of 289,164.29 square kilometers (115,121.88 square miles), lower than the Amhara Region average of 169.16 people per square kilometer (438.11 people per square mile).

Based on the 2007 Census conducted by the Central Statistical Agency of Ethiopia (CSA), this Zone has a total population of 457,278, a decrease of -1.23% from the 1994 census, of whom 227,328 are men and 229,950 women; with an area of 3,470.04 square kilometers, Oromia has a population density of 131.78. While 51,728 or 11.31% are urban inhabitants, a further 2,005 or 0.44% are pastoralists. A total of 101,442 households were counted in this Zone, which results in an average of 4.51 persons to a household, and 97,957 housing units.

The 1994 national census reported a total population for this Zone of 462,951 in 97,025 households, of whom 232,461 were men and 230,490 women; 39,666 or 8.57% of its population were urban dwellers at the time.

The three largest ethnic groups reported in Oromia in 1994 were the Oromo (65.34%), the Amhara (31.79%), and the Argobba (2.29%); all other ethnic groups made up 0.58% of the population. Oromo was spoken as a first language by 65.08%, and 34.29% spoke Amharic; the remaining 0.63% spoke all other primary languages reported. 98.01% were Muslim, and 1.92% of the population said they practiced Ethiopian Orthodox Christianity. By 2007, these had shifted dramatically, with reports of Oromo at 86.07%, the Amhara at 12.54%, and all other ethnic groups making up 1.39% of the population. At that point Oromo was spoken as a first language by 82.13% of the population, and 16.99% spoke Somali, with all other primary languages reported making up the remaining 0.88% . 97.07% were Muslim, and 2.4% of the population said they practiced Ethiopian Orthodox Christianity.

According to a May 24, 2004 World Bank memorandum, 5% of the inhabitants of Oromia have access to electricity, this zone has a road density of 23.9 kilometers per 1000 square kilometers (compared to the national average of 30 kilometers), the average rural household has 0.6 hectare of land (compared to the national average of 1.01 hectare of land and an average of 0.75 for the Amhara Region) and the equivalent of 0.5 heads of livestock. 10.9% of the population is in non-farm related jobs, compared to the national average of 25% and a regional average of 21%. 25% of all eligible children are enrolled in primary school, and 3% in secondary schools. 100% of the zone is exposed to malaria, and none to Tsetse fly. The memorandum gave this zone a drought risk rating of 565.

== 2021 Clashes in Oromia Zone ==
There have been two episodes of large-scale ethnic violence killing hundreds in and around the Ethiopian town of Ataye between the Oromo Liberation Army on one side and the Amhara militias (Fano) and Special Forces on the other. leading to nearly a quarter of the town being destroyed and hundreds of thousands displaced.
