= Premiership of Abiy Ahmed =

Administration of Ethiopian prime minister Abiy Ahmed since 2018

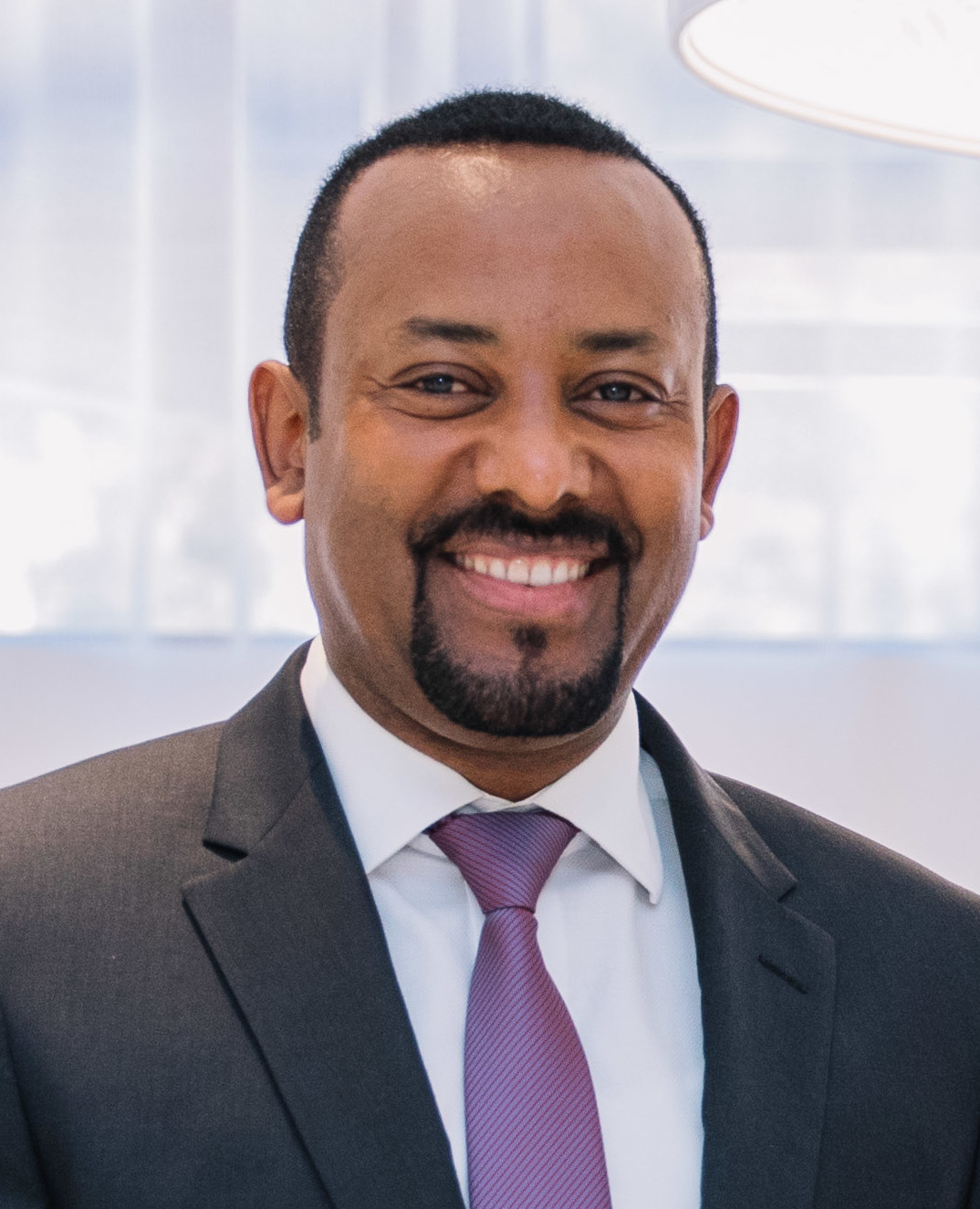
- Abiy in 2018
- Premiership of Abiy Ahmed; 2 April 2018 – present
- Party: Prosperity Party
- Seat: Menelik Palace
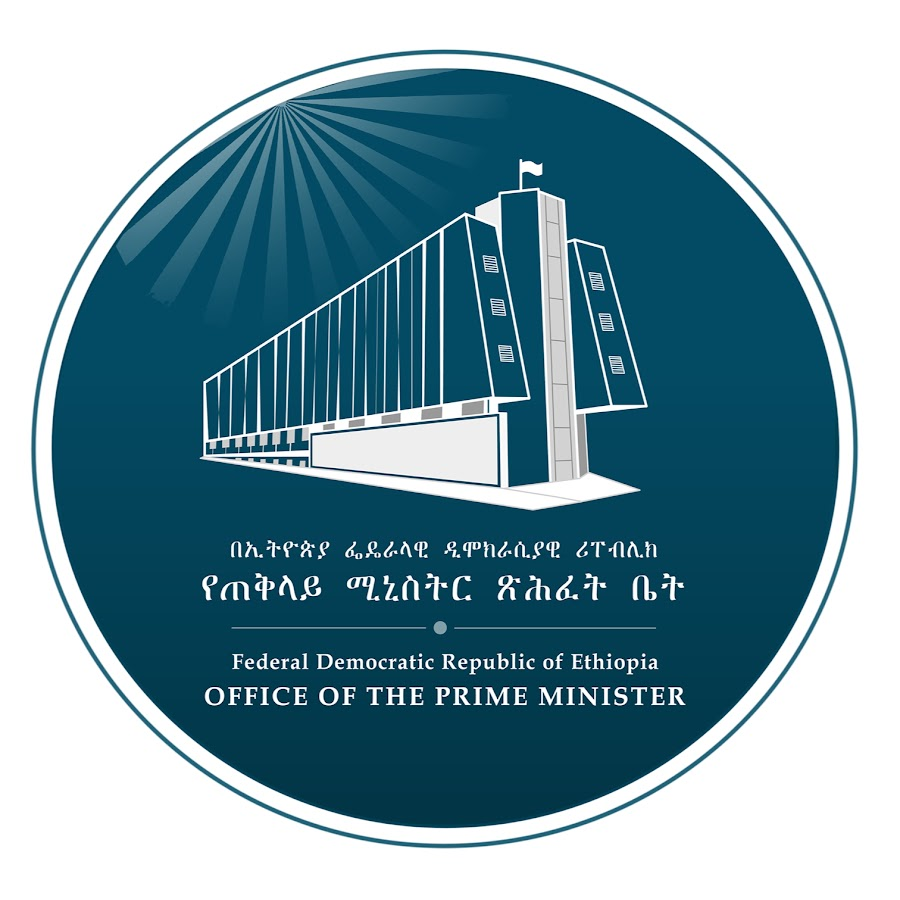
- Official seal of the Office of the Prime Minister

Abiy Ahmed is currently the third serving prime minister of Ethiopia. In 2018, he became the first ever Oromo descent to assume the role of prime minister in the history of Ethiopia. He won the Nobel Peace Prize in his second year as a prime minister of Ethiopia in 2019 becoming the eighth African laureates to win the award for peace.

Abiy Ahmed's tenure as prime minister of Ethiopia began on 2 April 2018 with his swearing-in at the Ethiopian parliament, succeeding Hailemariam Desalegn. Abiy is the first person of Oromo descent to hold the office, and became chair of the ruling Prosperity Party after the dissolution of the Ethiopian People's Revolutionary Democratic Front (EPRDF) in November 2019.

After taking office, he released thousands of political prisoners and initiated a number of major reforms to downsize state-owned enterprises and encourage privatization. Following a summit in 2018, Abiy received the Nobel Peace Prize for his efforts in resolving the 20-year-old border conflict between Ethiopia and Eritrea. Ethnic factionalism and violence continued in other parts of the country, however, eventually becoming a crisis during his tenure; his government was criticized as increasingly authoritarian in the years after he received the prize. Hostility between the Tigray People's Liberation Front (TPLF) and the federal government increased after the 2020 election in the Tigray Region, which the government called illegal. In November 2020, the Tigray War began between the Ethiopian and Tigray governments and their respective military and paramilitary allies. The war caused civilian casualties and displaced thousands of people.

== Background ==
Abiy began his political career as head of housing and urban development in Oromia. He then became a central-committee member of the Oromo Democratic Party (ODP), and was elected to the House of Peoples' Representatives for the Agaro constituency. At this time, Abiy began a Religious Finance Forum in response to growing tensions between Christians and Muslims. He then became a member of the Ethiopian People's Revolutionary Democratic Front (EPRDF).

After serving for one year, Abiy was reinstated as an ODP central-committee member. In late 2016, he was appointed deputy president of the Oromia Region while serving in the House of People's Representatives. Abiy became head of the ODP Secretariat and the Oromia Housing and Urban Development Office, and was elected to the executive committee of the EPRDF in early 2018. The 2016 Oromo protests led ODP party leader Lemma Megersa to support the call for reform in the ODP from Ethiopians abroad. In mid-February 2018, the party invited opposition-party members to Ethiopia to survey the democratic system in Oromia and Ethiopia at large.

The ruling EPRDF elected Abiy chair and, in turn, prime minister. The party elected him on March 20, 2018, after an in-depth review of the executive committee's performance and renewal program. Shiferaw Shigute, a head officer of the EPRDF, announced at a press conference that the council's meeting was successful; "heated debates were entertained and agreements reached to [widen] internal democracy within the party, tackling unprincipled networks and antidemocratic attitudes." Shiferaw said that Abiy's election was "democratic and transparent", with "all members [casting] their votes confidently." The meeting was held to prevent the distrust and skepticism which the party had faced with past leadership.

According to the secretary, there were no secret negotiations about the appointment; the party's rules and norms were respected. Shiferaw said that the withdrawal of Demeke Mekonnen had no direct correlation with the election, and a future reshuffle based on an evaluation by the EPRDF cabinet would be possible.

On April 2, 2018, Abiy was sworn in as prime minister of Ethiopia in the House of Federation and promised to "build peaceful diplomatic relations with Eritrea, to work for inclusive development, combatting corruption in the democratic environment." He pledged to work with women and youth and end the civil unrest which began in 2016.

== Domestic policy ==
Abiy's government released many political prisoners jailed by former EPRDF rulers, including activist Kinfe Michael Debebe, Ginbot 7 leader Andargachew Tsige and his colleague Berhanu Nega, and Oromo dissident and public intellectual Jawar Mohammed. Most of the remaining detainees were journalists from the US-based ESAT and OMN satellite television networks. On May 30, 2018, Abiy's surprise meeting with Andargachew (released after four years on death row) was called "unprecedented and previously unimaginable". He had been apprehended at Sana'a International Airport in Yemen in 2014 and extradited to Ethiopia.

The government amended the country's "draconian" anti-terrorism law that day, which was widely perceived as a tool of political repression. Abiy hinted at abolishing the law, which had "led to the detention and persecution of thousands in the East African country." On June 1, 2018, he announced the end of the state of emergency which had been imposed two years before; it was lifted on June 4. Abiy countered criticism of his government's release of convicted "terrorists", which (according to the opposition) is a label the EPRDF gives to the opposition. He said that policies which sanctioned arbitrary detention and torture were extra-constitutional acts of terror aimed at suppressing opposition. Three hundred four prisoners (289 convicted of terrorism charges) were pardoned on June 15. According to the Ethiopian attorney general, three Kenyan prisoners were pardoned and released after a bilateral agreement was signed between Ethiopia and Kenya to strengthen relations. By that time, one thousand prisoners had been pardoned.

According to the pro-government website Tigrai Online, the maintenance of a state of emergency was vital and Abiy was "doing too much too fast". Other critics expressed concern that the release of thousands of political prisoners would reduce faith in Ethiopia's criminal-justice system if they constituted a danger. On June 13, the TPLF executive committee denounced the handover of Badme due to the Algiers Agreement and criticized the privatization of state-owned enterprises; the committee said that the ruling coalition failed to account for a fundamental leadership deficit.

Abune Merkorios, the fourth patriarch of the Ethiopian Orthodox Tewahedo Church, returned to Ethiopia on August 1, 2018, after being exiled to the United States in 1991 and was warmly received at Holy Trinity Cathedral in Addis Ababa. Abiy said that "the return of the Abune Merkorios is a joyous moment for all Ethiopians. The church has shown in deeds the fall of a wall of division that had split the church."

=== Transparency ===
Abiy has called for exiled journalists, particularly from ESAT, to return to Ethiopia; ESAT had called for the genocide of Ethiopian Tigrayans. By March 21, 2019, Abiy had only given one press conference and refused questions from journalists.

According to Human Rights Watch, the Committee to Protect Journalists and Amnesty International, the Abiy government has arrested opposition journalists and closed media outlets except for ESAT. His government suspended the press license of Reuters's correspondent, and issued a written warning to correspondents from the BBC and Deutsche Welle for what it called a "violation of the rules of media broadcasting". At the UNESCO World Press Prize ceremony on May 3, 2019, Abiy said that he would establish a "truly democratic political order and transform the media landscape" while avoiding misinformation.

Ethiopia's freedom of the press declined in 2021, when 46 journalists were reportedly detained or repressed by the government. Journalist Gobez Sisay disappeared in 2022.

=== Economic reforms ===
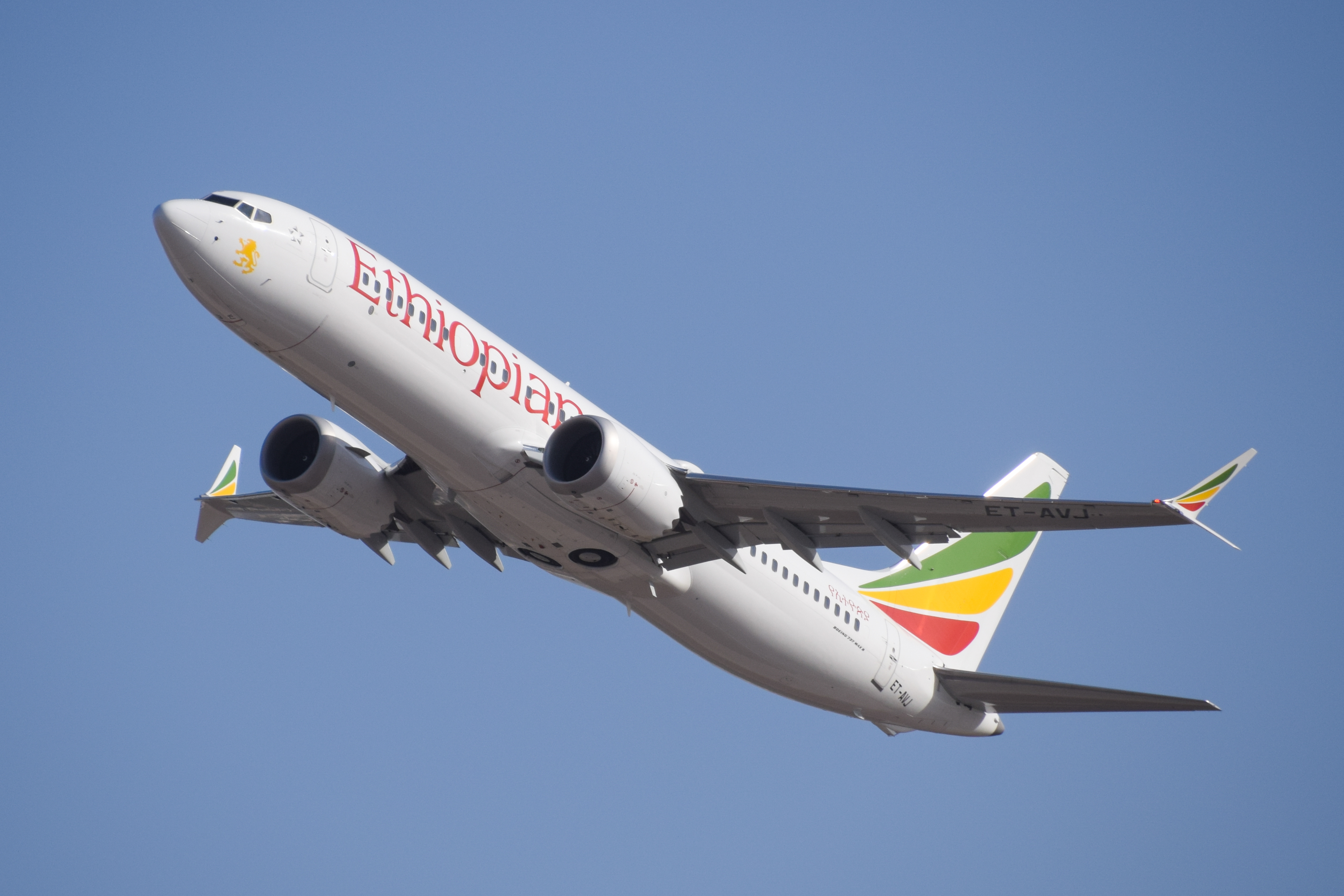
Ethiopian Airlines and Ethio telecom have been state-owned enterprises during Abiy's administration.

In June 2018, Abiy announced the reform of state-owned enterprises in a number of economic sectors, such as telecommunications, energy, and transportation. He hoped to end unemployment through privatization and increasing foreign direct investment. State monopolies include Ethiopian Airlines and Ethio Telecom, of interest to private investors with shares sold from the aviation, electricity, and logistics sectors.

Ethiopian Airlines, Africa's largest and most profitable carrier, was offered for purchase by domestic and foreign investors; maintaining the majority of shares, the government planned to privatize it. State-owned enterprises in less critical sectors, including railway operators, sugar farms, industrial parks, hotels and manufacturing firms, may be fully privatized. The move was seen as a pragmatic measure after a poor fiscal year resulting in $3.2 billion in foreign reserves, less than two months' worth of imports.

In June 2018, Abiy initiated a stock exchange; until 2015, Ethiopia had the fastest economic growth of any country without a stock exchange. In June 2020, the finance minister drafted a bill to create a stock-market economy which was passed on December 22 of that year.

=== Security reforms ===
Abiy spoke to Ethiopian National Defense Force (ENDF) senior commanders in June 2018 about reforming the military, effectively limiting their role in politics. Amnesty International asked and other international human-rights groups asked Ethiopia to dissolve the regional paramilitary force known as the Liyyu force.

Abiy hoped to move the Ethiopian Navy into active duty so the landlocked country could join other naval forces, saying on state television: "We should build our naval-force capacity in the future." He reshuffled the armed forces on June 7, 2018, replacing Chief of Staff Samora Yunis with Lieutenant General Se'are Mekonnen, National Intelligence and Security Service (NISS) director Getachew Assefa with General Adem Mohammed, and National Security Advisor and former army chief Abadula Gemeda with Sebhat Nega. A chief co-founder of the TPLF, Sebhat had announced his retirement the previous month.

=== Internet shutdowns ===
Internet shutdowns have increased under Abiy. Supporters defend the shutdowns as useful tool to control information, but opponents have criticized them as punitive. According to Human Rights Watch and NetBlocks, politically-motivated shutdowns have been increasing in severity despite Ethiopia's recent reliance on rapid digitalization and cellular internet connectivity. Internet shutdowns were "frequently deployed" in 2020, and Access Now called them a "go-to tool for authorities to muzzle unrest and activism." Abiy has said that his government would shut down the Internet as needed: "It's neither water nor air".

=== Cabinet reshuffle ===
On October 16, 2018, Abiy reduced his cabinet from 28 to 20 ministers during a parliamentary session. Half were women, which was unprecedented. His new cabinet contained Sahle-Work Zewde as the first female president, Aisha Mohammed Musa as Minister of Defense and Muferiat Kamil as Minister of Peace, with oversight of intelligence and security agencies. Writer and activist Billene Seyoum was the first press secretary of the Office of the Prime Minister.

=== Party reform ===
The EPRDF administration consisted of four parties, most represented by ethnic groups: the Tigray People's Liberation Front (TPLF), the Oromo People Democratic Organization (OPDO), the Amhara National Democratic Movement (ANDM), and the Southern Ethiopian People's Democratic Movement (SEPDM). On November 21, 2019, Abiy formed the Prosperity Party by merging the following parties:

- the Oromo Democratic Party (ODP),
- the Southern Ethiopian People's Democratic Movement (SEPDM),
- the Amhara Democratic Party (ADP),
- the Harari National League (HNL),
- the Ethiopian Somali People's Democratic Party (ESPDP),
- the Afar National Democratic Party (ANDP),
- the Gambella People's Unity Party (GPUP), and
- the Benishangul Gumuz People's Democratic Party (BGPDP)

Abiy said that the "Prosperity Party is committed to strengthening and applying a true federal system which recognizes the diversity and contributions of all Ethiopians".

== Foreign policy ==
During the 2017 Saudi Arabian purge, Abiy released about 1,000 Ethiopian prisoners after a request by Saudi Crown Prince Mohammed bin Salman and discussed bilateral, regional, and global issues affecting both countries during a two-day visit. Detainees included billionaire Mohammed Hussein Al-Amoudi. In June 2018, Abiy met Egyptian president Abdel Fattah el-Sisi in Cairo; he also met with South Sudanese president Salva Kiir and rebel leader Riek Machar in Addis Ababa to facilitate peace talks. Ethiopia played a role in the regional IGAD's work for peace in South Sudan.

=== Djibouti and port agreement ===
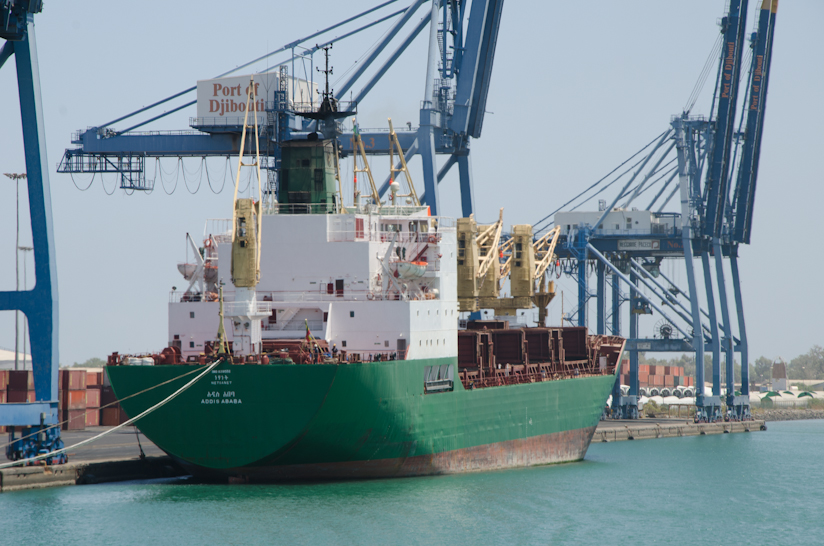
Ethiopian cargo ship in the Port of Djibouti. In 2018, Ethiopia signed an agreement with Djibouti to access the port.

Ethiopia announced its intention to hold a stake in the Port of Djibouti, a gateway for trade, in May 2018. Djibouti had been seeking foreign investors due to the termination of Dubai's state-owned DP World concession and failure to have a contract for six years. The government announced that it would hold a 19-percent stake in Berbera Port, located in the unrecognized Republic of Somaliland, as part of a joint venture with DP World. Two days later, Sudan agreed to give Port Sudan to Ethiopia. The Ethio-Djibouti agreement allowed Djibouti to become a stakeholder in state-owned Ethiopian firms such as Ethio Telecom and Ethiopian Airlines after Abiy and Kenyan president Uhuru Kenyatta agreed to build an Ethiopian logistics facility at Lamu Port, part of the Lamu Port and Lamu-Southern Sudan-Ethiopia Transport Corridor (LAPSSET) project.

=== Eritrea ===
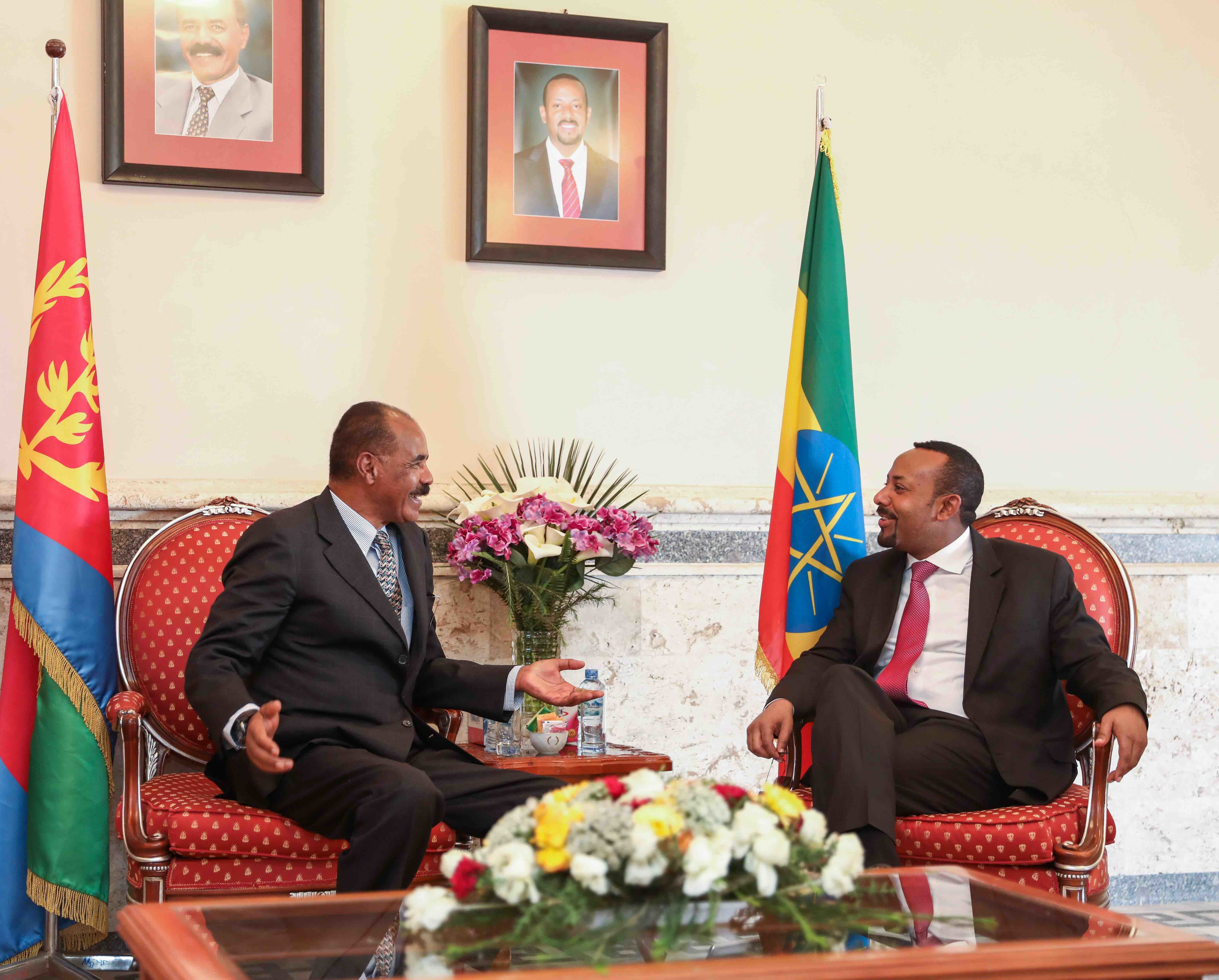
Abiy (right) with Eritrean president Isaias Afewerki in 2019

Abiy has worked to end the Eritrean–Ethiopian border conflict; his government announced in June 2018 that it would hand over the disputed town of Badme to Eritrea, end hostilities between the countries, and comply with the 2000 Algiers Agreement. Both countries were in a frozen conflict described as "no war, no peace", with tens of thousands of deaths. BBC Tigrinya editor Samuel Gebrehiwot said that "change could be on the cards, but few imagined it could happen this quickly".

On 20 June 2018, Eritrean president Isaias Afewerki sent a high-level delegation to Addis Ababa to implement a peace agreement in accordance with the Algiers Agreement. On 26 June, Eritrean Foreign Minister Osman Saleh Mohammed visited Addis Ababa for the first time in over two decades. Abiy was the first Ethiopian leader to meet his counterpart, Eritrean president Isaias Afewerk, in over two decades at the 8 July 2018 Eritrea–Ethiopia summit in Asmara. He ended the bilateral tension by signing a joint declaration of peace and friendship ensuring direct telecommunications, road, and aviation links using Massawa and Asseb. Abiy received the 2019 Nobel Peace Prize.

Some Eritrean critics asked why only one party to a minor peace agreement should receive the Nobel Peace Prize. In July 2020, the Eritrean Ministry of Information said: "Two years after the signing of the Peace Agreement, Ethiopian troops continue to be present in our sovereign territories. Trade and economic ties of both countries have not resumed to the desired extent or scale." Anonymous Ethiopian officials alleged that Abiy and Isaias secretly conspired against Tigray.

=== Egypt ===
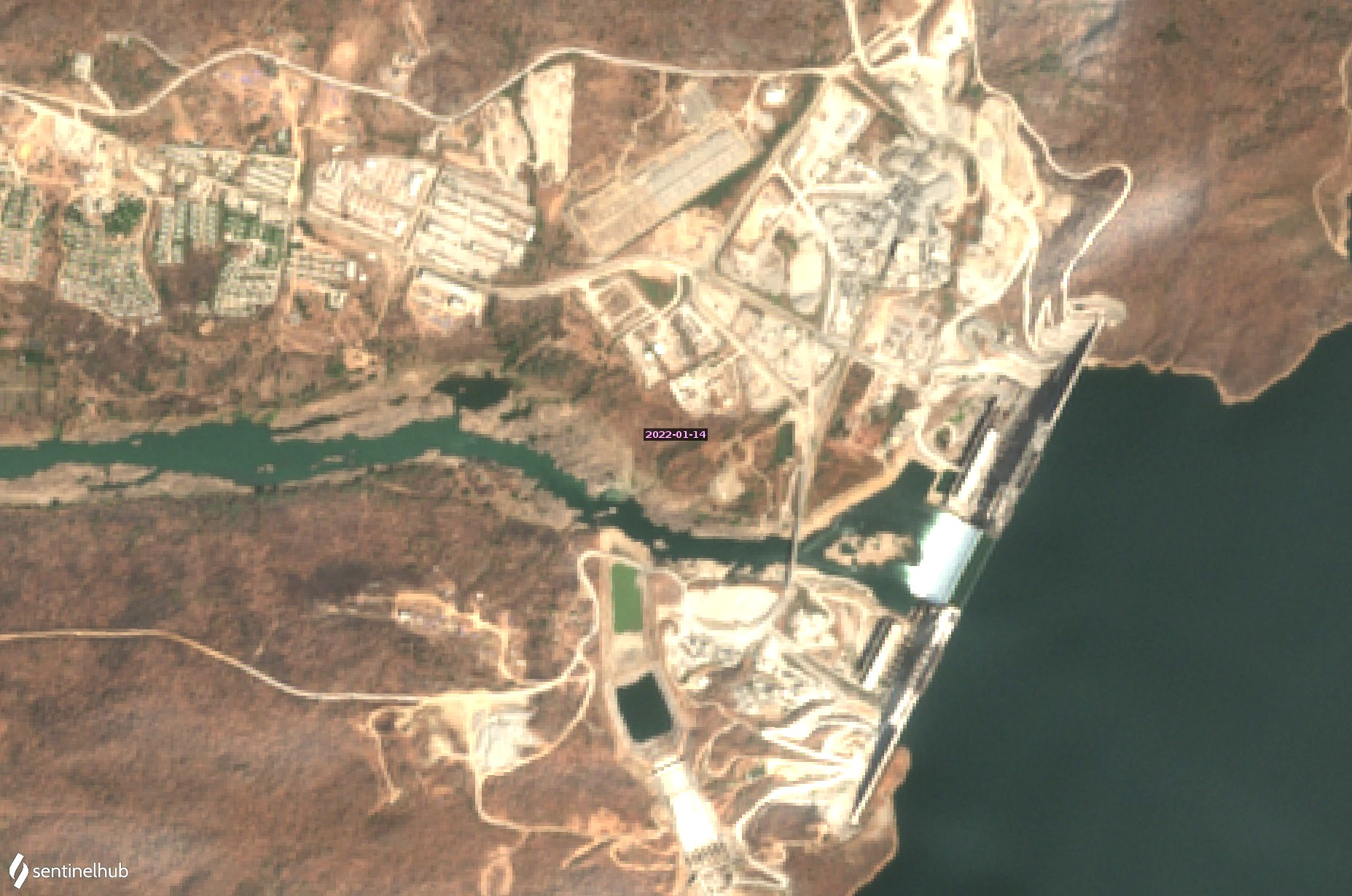
14 January 2022 Sentinel-2 Level-2A image of the Grand Ethiopian Renaissance Dam

The controversial Grand Ethiopian Renaissance Dam was under construction since 2011 (it was completed in 2025). On 4 July 2018, a diplomatic meeting was held in Ethiopia to discuss the facilitation of foreign relations with Egypt and other Arab countries and coordinating with the private sector to serve Egyptian strategic interests. Abiy pledged that the dam would not affect Egypt's share of Nile water agreed in the 1959 convention, reversing previous government decisions. Egypt feared that the water flow would decrease by 2019, and the UN predicted that Egypt would lose its water supply by 2025. Abiy downplayed Egypt's concern, saying that "no force can stop the dam's completion". In a January 2022 letter, he called on Sudan and Egypt to "nurture towards building peace, cooperation, mutual co-existence and development of all our people without harming one another. If there is a need to go to war, we could get millions readied."

The June 2020 murder of activist and singer Hachalu Hundessa sparked violence in Addis Ababa and other Ethiopian cities; Abiy hinted, without obvious suspects or a motive for the killing, that Hundessa may have been murdered by Egyptian security agents acting on orders from Cairo. An Egyptian diplomat said that Egypt "has nothing to do with current tensions in Ethiopia". In a Time magazine article, Ian Bremmer wrote that Abiy "may just be looking for a scapegoat that can unite Ethiopians against a perceived common enemy".

== Civil conflicts ==
The number of ethnic clashes has increased during Abiy's premiership. The first conflict was the Gedeo–West Gurji, which displaced 1.4 million people; the year's highest violence-related displacement, it was caused by a shortage of food, farmland, and livestock supplements. Awol Allo said that when Abiy came to power in 2018, two irreconcilable future visions were created. Abiy undertook reforms, and the liberation was suspected of worsening the relationship with the Tigray People's Liberation Front.

=== Amhara Region coup d'état attempt ===
On 22 June 2019, factions of the Amhara Region's security forces attempted a coup d'état against the regional government during which regional president Ambachew Mekonnen was assassinated. A bodyguard siding with nationalist factions assassinated Ethiopian National Defense Force general-staff chief Se'are Mekonnen and his aide, Major General Gizae Aberra. The Prime Minister's office accused regional security-forces chief Asaminew Tsige of leading the plot, and Tsige was shot dead by police near Bahir Dar on 24 June.

=== Metekel conflict ===
Fighting in the Metekel Zone of the Benishangul-Gumuz Region, which began in June 2019, reportedly involved Gumuz militias. The Gumuz have allegedly formed militias such as Buadin and the Gumuz Liberation Front which have staged attacks. According to Amnesty International, the 22–23 December 2020 attacks were made by the Gumuz against Amhara, the Oromo and Shinasha (whom Gumuz nationalists viewed as "settlers").

=== October 2019 clashes ===
In October 2019, Ethiopian activist and media owner Jawar Mohammed said that police attempted to force his security detail to leave his home in Addis Ababa so they could detain him during the night of 23 October at the behest of Abiy. The previous day, Abiy gave a speech in Parliament accusing "media owners who don't have Ethiopian passports" of "playing it both ways" (a reference to Jawar); "if this is going to undermine the peace and existence of Ethiopia ... we will take measures."

=== Hachalu Hundessa riots ===
The murder of Oromo singer Hachalu Hundessa led to serious unrest in Oromia, Addis Ababa and Jimma from 30 June to 2 July 2020. According to initial police reports, the riots led to the deaths of at least 239 people.

=== Tigray War ===
In early November 2020, an armed conflict began after Northern Command attacks by Tigray People's Liberation Front security forces prompted the Ethiopian National Defense Force to respond. The ENDF is supported by the Eritrean Defence Forces, Amhara and Afar Region special forces and other regional forces; the Tigray Special Force and Tigray Defense Force aided the TPLF. Hostilities between the central government and the TPLF escalated after the TPLF rejected the government's decision to postpone the August 2020 elections to mid-2021 due to the COVID-19 pandemic, with the TPLF accusing the government of violating the Ethiopian constitution.

The TPLF conducted regional elections, winning all contested seats in the regional parliament. In response, Abiy redirected funding from the top level of the Tigray regional government to weaken the party.

The Ethiopian government announced on 28 November 2020 that they had captured the Tigray capital of Mekelle, completing their "rule of law operations". However, reports of guerrilla-style conflict with the TPLF continues.

According to the United Nations, about 2.3 million children are cut off from humanitarian aid. The Ethiopian government has strictly controlled access to the Tigray region since the start of the conflict, and the UN has expressed frustration that talks with the government have yet to enable humanitarian access. UNICEF said that the aid consists of "food, including ready-to-use therapeutic food for the treatment of child malnutrition, medicines, water, fuel and other essentials that are running low".

On 23 November, an Agence France-Presse reporter visited the western Tigray town of Humera and noted that officials had taken over administration of conquered portions of Western Tigray from the Amhara Region. Refugees interviewed by AFP said that the pro-TPLF troops used the Hitsats refugee camp as a base for several weeks in November 2020, killing several refugees who wanted to leave the camp to get food; in one incident, nine young Eritrean men were killed in revenge for losing a battle against the EDF. On 18 December 2020, thefts by Amhara forces were reported by the Europe External Programme with Africa which included 500 dairy cows and hundreds of calves.

In a victory speech delivered to the federal parliament on 30 November 2020, Abiy said: "Related to civilian damage, maximum caution was taken in just three weeks of fighting, in any district, Humera, Adi Goshu, Axum, Edaga Hamus. The defence forces never killed a single civilian in a single town. No soldier from any country could display better competence." On 21 March 2021, during a parliamentary session in which Abiy was questioned about sexual violence in the Tigray War, he said: "The women in Tigray? These women have only been penetrated by men, whereas a knife penetrated our soldiers".

The image of a Nobel Peace Prize winner has been re-assessed by international media as reports of atrocities emerge. In December 2021, Declan Walsh reported in The New York Times that Abiy and Isaias had been secretly planning the Tigray War before Abiy received the Nobel Prize to settle their scores with the TPLF.
