= October 2019 Ethiopian clashes =

Deadly Ethiopian protests in the Oromia Region

- The Oromia in Ethiopia.
- Location: Oromia, Ethiopia and vicinity
- Date: 23–28 October 2019
- Attack type: Pogrom, looting, arson, mass murder
- Deaths: 86
- Motive: Clashes reported between opponents and Jawar supporters

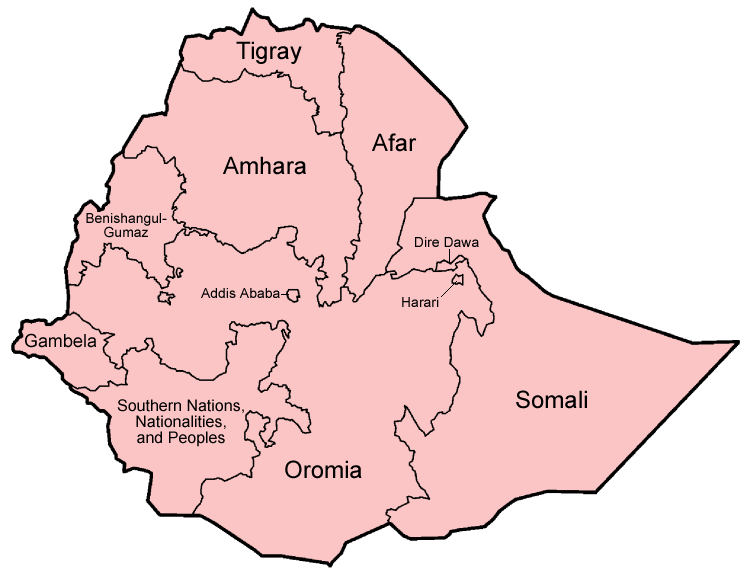
Map of the Regions of Ethiopia; each is based on ethnicity and language, rather than physical geography or history.

The October 2019 Ethiopian clashes were a civil unrest that broke out in Addis Ababa, on 23 October 2019 and swiftly spread to entire Oromia Region after activist and Director of Oromia Media Network, Jawar Mohammed reported on his Facebook page around midnight, on Tuesday. In his post, Jawar has said that his house was surrounded by police officers and that they tried to withdraw his security guards from their posts. His VIP security detail was assigned to him by the government once he arrived from the US. According to official reports, 86 people were killed, 76 were killed by Communal violence, while 10 were security forces of Ethiopia.

== Background ==
In October 2019, Ethiopian activist and media owner Jawar Mohammed claimed that members of the police had attempted to force his security detail to vacate the grounds of his home in Addis Ababa in order to detain him the night of 23 October, intimating that they had done so at the behest of Prime Minister Abiy Ahmed. The previous day, Abiy had given a speech in Parliament in which he had accused "media owners who don't have Ethiopian passports" of "playing it both ways", a thinly veiled reference to Jawar, adding that "if this is going to undermine the peace and existence of Ethiopia... we will take measures."

== Events ==
The reports sparked nationwide protests. The morning after the report, Jawar supporters congregated around his house in Addis Ababa to protest, denouncing Prime Minister Abiy and his government. Protesters began blockading roads in Oromia. In the late afternoon, protests turned to violence as police clear blockade and counter-protests began, leaving at least 67 people dead, including five police officers. After the protests spread to the Karakore neighborhood, local residents counter-protested, resulting in police intervention to separate the two groups. Protesters blocked key highways, in particular roads leading to Addis Ababa. There were however scenes of kindness; residents in Welkite and Butajira provided food and shelter for those stuck on the road. An eyewitness told Reuters that he had seen the bodies of at least seven people who had been "beaten to death using sticks, metal rods and machetes".

On 23 October, clashes occurred in Ambo, Adama, and Haramaya, killing at least 6 and injuring 40. Road blockages were reported in Shashamane and riots occurred in Addis Ababa and surrounding towns, including the neighborhoods of Bole Bulbula, Kotebe, and Karakore. In Dodola woreda, the violence targeted the Orthodox community, with shops and houses attacked. Members of the community took shelter in the local church, but there were "dozens injured" after a grenade was thrown into the church yard. Later, police took some of the injured for medical treatment, but "a mob stopped the vehicle and brutally killed three of the injured" before they could reach the hospital. Victims told Agence France-Presse that in Adama rioters attacked those who could not speak Oromo. A group in Adama attacked a Voice of America reporter who was covering the riots; he was taken to hospital but escaped serious injury.

On 24 October, 68 people were arrested after looting and attempting to burn a mosque and church in Adama, according to the city's mayor, in an attempt to "spark ethnic and religious conflict". Oromia police confirmed on Friday that the number of people killed in the region in connection with the latest string of violence seems to have taken ethnic and religious form, has reached 67. The Ethiopian Orthodox Tewahedo Church called for peace and condemned the violence in a meeting with government officials. Jawar appealed for calm and claimed that his supporters were re-opening roads, but at the same time told his followers "to sleep with one eye open"; riots continued.

The latest protests came days after the first popular protest against Prime Minister Abiy Ahmed was held since he came to power back in April 2018. Security forces had been deployed in Ambo, Bishoftu, Bale Robe, Mojo, Adama, Harar, and Dire Dawa. A national blood drive was launched to help the victims, with over 100,000 participating in the first two days. Kefyalew Tefera, Oromo Regional police commissioner, said that there had been "a hidden agenda to divert the whole protest into an ethnic and religious conflict; there were attempts to burn churches and mosques." The official death toll had reached 67, with 15 rioters having been killed by security forces and the remainder killed by others, including at least five police officers. According to local media, "citizen reports" however suggest the true death toll is upwards of one hundred.

On 31 October, Prime Minister Abiy Ahmed updated the death toll to at 78, adding that least 400 people had been arrested around the country in connection with the attacks. Protests against Abiy erupted in Addis Ababa and in Ethiopia's Oromia region on October 23 after a high-profile activist accused security forces of trying to orchestrate an attack against him. The activist at the centre of last week's protests, Jawar Mohammed, is credited with helping to sweep Abiy to power last year but he has recently become critical of some of the premier's policies.

== Aftermath and reactions ==
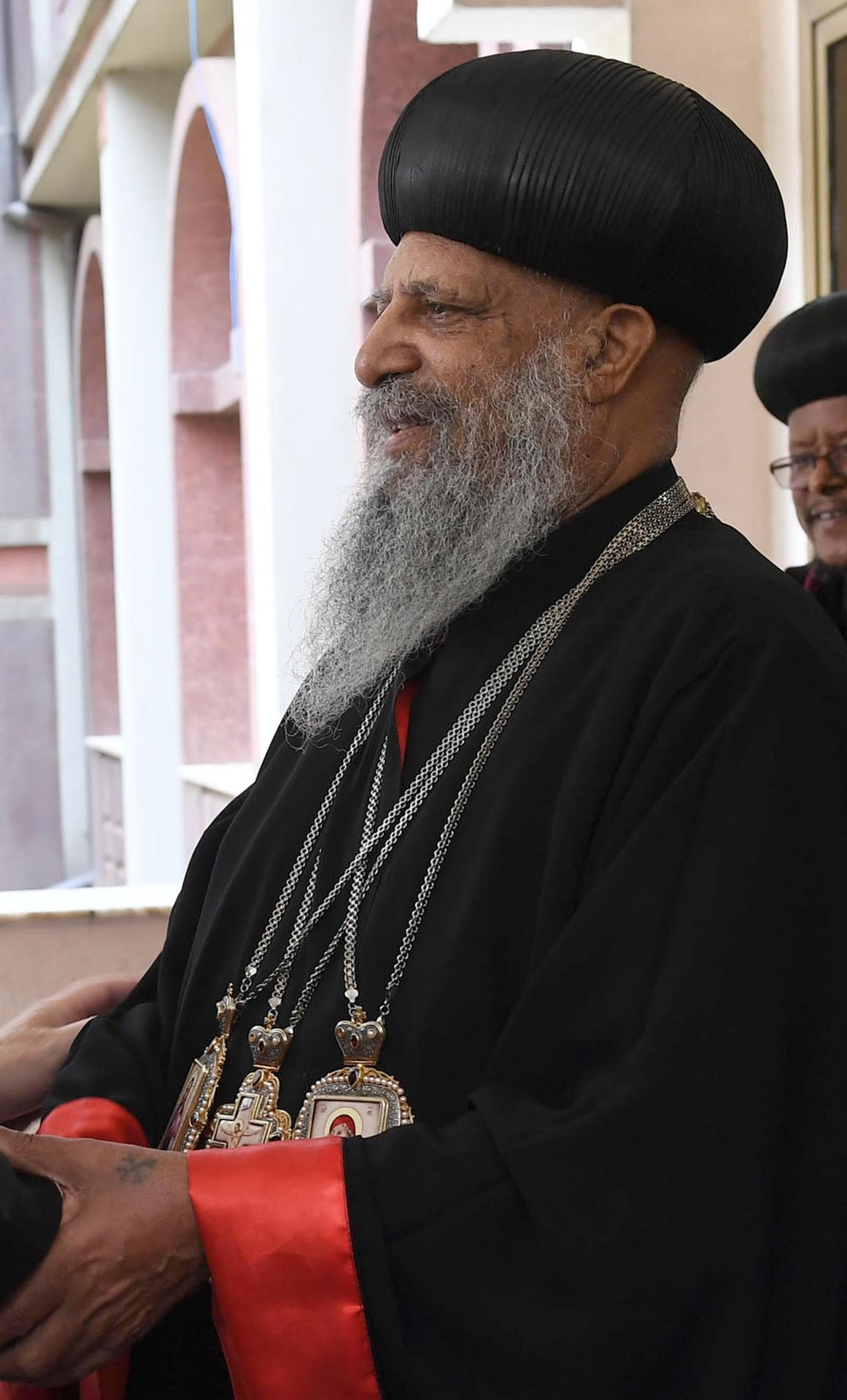
Abune Mathias, Patriarch of the Ethiopian Orthodox Tewahedo Church, grieved over the lives lost in the violence.

Today I am deeply grieved. I have the urge to weep like a child. My heart is crushed by grief. My eyes have had no sleep, but many tears. In the day to day hopes for improvement, we have been asking the government to put a stop to it [the violence]. However, we have seen nothing change. Instead, I have caused my children to be massacred. While I was preaching to you about peace, those that do not know peace have deprived you of peace.

— Abune Mathias, Patriarch of the Ethiopian Orthodox Tewahedo Church

Prime Minister Abiy, who had been in Sochi attending the Russia-Africa Summit, issued a statement upon his return the evening of the 26th, in which he vowed "to bring the perpetrators to justice" and warned that instability could worsen if "Ethiopians did not unite". Billene Seyoum, Press Secretary to the Prime Minister, said that violence was in part a "backlash" to plans to merge the ruling Ethiopian People's Revolutionary Democratic Front into a single party.

Abiy has been criticised for his belated response to the violence, including by the Ethiopian Orthodox Tewahedo Church. "People are dying and questions are being raised if the government even exists. The people are losing all hope," said a church spokesman. On October 28, Abune Mathias, Patriarch of the Orthodox Church, made an emotional appeal for the violence to stop and expressed his grief over the casualties. Another bishop said that the faithful who had been killed had "thought that they were living among fellow humans but were unexpectedly devoured by wolves".

Shimelis Abdisa, acting President of the Oromia, condemned the "incident" with Jawar, terming it a "major mistake", and called for an investigation. Federal Police Commissioner, General Endashaw Tassew, denied that the police had targeted Jawar, but said that they had been "reassessing the need for private security details for VIPs".
