= Sehin Teferra =

- Born: Addis Ababa
- Occupation: Women's rights activist

Sehin Teferra is an Ethiopian feminist activist who promotes the idea of Ethiopian identity and sees herself as pan-Ethiopianist.

== Childhood and education ==
Sehin Teferra was born in Addis Ababa. She attended primary school at Nazareth School and high school at Sanford English Community School. She obtained a sociology undergraduate degree at the University of La Verne campus in Athens, a master's degree in international development with a focus on gender at Clark University, and obtained her PhD at SOAS University of London in 2015.

== Feminist activism ==
Sehin co-founded a feminist group Setaweet and a corresponding firm Setaweet Plc, in a "hybrid social enterprise model".

During October 2011-July 2102, Sehin carried out research into the situation of sex workers in Addis Ababa, carrying out "90 interviews, seven focus group discussions with sex worker women and their male partners, as well as two groups of male university students". She found that the sex workers did not see themselves as victims, and that they were "intelligent, humorous and often honest about the opportunities and challenges of being a sex worker". Sehin summarised by stating that the "views and experiences of the women [who were] interviewed paint a complex picture where many women come into their own, negotiating with their sexuality an income while withstanding the 'occupational hazard' of rampant violence."

In February 2021, Sehin stated that Setaweet had recorded testimonies from victims of sexual violence in the Tigray war. The victims attributed rapes to the Eritrean Defence Forces (EDF). Sehin stated that Setaweet's documentation showed that rape was "happening on a large scale" and that "parents in Tigray [were] shaving their daughters' heads and dressing them 'as boys' to protect them from rape".

== Points of view ==
=== Ethnic identity ===
Sehin disagrees with Awol Allo's views on ethnic identity in Ethiopia, arguing that Awol incorrectly rejects the existence of an Ethiopian identity by misrepresenting it. She described Awol as a bigot for denying the right of Ethiopians to see themselves as having an Ethiopian identity.

Sehin identifies herself as pan-Ethiopianist.

=== Violence ===
According to Martha Kuwee Kumsa, Sehin "categorical[ly] associat[es]" the Qeerroo with violence, which Martha criticises as hiding the diversity among Qeerroos. Also according to Martha, Sehin criticised Awol Allo for criticising violence against Oromos but not violence by Oromos.

Sehin described Awol as having "fanned the flames of ethnic bigotry" in relation to the June 2020 Hachalu Hundessa riots that followed the murder of Oromo singer Hachalu Hundessa. She interpreted Awol's use of the word "they" in relation to the protests as an ethnic "us-vs-them" attitude. Sehin interpreted Awol's criticism of arrests made in relation to the protests as supporting the violence and of ignoring the evidence of the possible involvement of the Oromo Liberation Front in the murder. She accused Awol of being "silen[t] against the atrocities committed by his own side."

== Criticism ==
Martha criticised Sehin for Sehin's criticism of Awol, in which Sehin described Awol's view of Ethiopian identity as a "bogeyman of Ethiopianness".
