= Martha Kuwee Kumsa =

Feminist and professor

- Born: c. 1955; Dembidolo
- Occupation: University teacher, journalist, writer
- Employer: Wilfrid Laurier University

Martha Kuwee Kumsa is a siinqee feminist and professor at Wilfrid Laurier University in Canada, specialising in Oromo culture and cultural and immigrant identity. She is of Oromo origin and was detained without charges and tortured from 1980 to 1989, following the Ethiopian Red Terror, for her journalistic activities promoting Oromo women's rights. In late 2020, Martha objected to media misrepresentation of the Hachalu Hundessa riots and what she saw as wave of repression by federal authorities against Oromos.

== Early life ==
Martha Kuwee Kumsa was born in Dembidolo in Oromia Region in 1954 or 1955 (age 71). One of her parents was a Presbyterian minister. Her middle name is that of an Oromo heroine. Martha finished high school and moved to Addis Ababa to study at university, hoping to become an engineer. After arriving in Addis Ababa, the 1974 Ethiopian Revolution took place and universities were closed. Martha trained as a journalist and married a chemical engineer, Lencho Letta, a veteran politician and one of the outstanding figures in the history of Oromo Liberation Front (OLF).

== Ethiopian Revolution ==
=== 1974–1980: Family, Red Terror and journalism ===
In 1975, Martha and Leenco had their first child. In 1977, the Ethiopian Red Terror was underway, while Martha was in her third pregnancy. Leenco became one of the founders of the Oromo Liberation Movement/Oromo Liberation Front (OLM/OLF), in resistance against the authorities. He was detained during the night four times in six months. The first three times Leenco returned after being tortured. He did not return after the fourth detention. Desperate to find her husband, Martha turned over dead bodies in the street. She named her third baby Goli, meaning "terror" in Oromo. She spent a year searching for Leenco. Unknown to Martha, Leenco left Ethiopia after his fourth detention.

Martha worked as a journalist, writing a column supporting Oromo women's culture and calling for Oromo women to defy the existing systems of power and reclaim their culture.

=== 1980–1989: Detention without charges ===
In 1980, Martha was detained by four plainclothes security force officers who detained her and took her to a prison. She described the scene on arrival as including people on the floor, "bleeding from their mouths, [with] disfigured [faces] and pus ooz[ing] from wounds," and an "overpowering stench".

Martha was tortured the first time by foot whipping. She was tortured nine more times during her first year of detention, and then moved to another prison for nine years. Martha was neither charged nor tried. Amnesty International viewed the reasons for Martha's imprisonment as being her journalism and her supports for Oromo rights.

While in prison, Martha learnt French and Tigrinya and taught biology, geography and mathematics to other prisoners and to children of prison administrators. Martha obtained a meeting with her children by faking the need for dental treatment.

Organisations including PEN America campaigned to release Martha. She received the 1989 PEN/Barbara Goldsmith Freedom to Write Award prior to her release.

She was released from prison without warning on 10 September 1989, in a mass release of political and non-political detainees.

== 1989–present: Emigration ==
On release from prison, Martha remained unaware of Leenco's survival or death. She was asked by resistance groups to participate in training camps, and conscripted by the authorities into joining governmental forces. Seven months after her release, Marth and her children escaped to Kenya, walking a fortnight through the forest. Unknown to Martha, Leenco had survived, and in 1991 helped to negotiate the transition to power by the Ethiopian People's Revolutionary Democratic Front (EPRDF). He telephoned Martha in July 1991, and met her and their children in Kenya. Two days later, in September 1991, Martha and the children flew to Canada. Leenco moved to London in 1993 and joined the family in Canada in 1996.

Martha obtained her bachelor's degree in social work at York University in 1996, a master's degree at the University of Toronto in 1997, and a PhD at the University of Toronto in 2004. She lived in Waterloo, where she did freelance writing and obtained a teaching position at Wilfrid Laurier University in 2002, later becoming a full professor. Leenco was ineligible for Canadian citizenship because of his role in armed opposition in the OLF, and moved to Norway in August 2005.

== Research interests ==
Martha's research interests include Oromo culture and cultural identity and adaptation of immigrants.

== Activism ==
Apart from her lifelong involvement in journalism and writing, Martha became active in PEN Canada and Amnesty International, and in human rights advocacy by giving public talks around the world on human rights and freedom of speech.

== Points of view ==
In November 2020, Martha expressed concern about anti-Oromo misinformation and the risk of Ethiopia returning to an assimilationist, centralized state dominated by Amhara nationalism. Writing together with Bontu Galataa in The Washington Post, Martha argued that there were 9000 arrests of Oromos following the Hachalu Hundessa riots, constituting a wave of repression and misinformation that misrepresented the victims – Oromos – as the perpetrators of the massacre. Bontu and Martha argued that the Qeerroo and Qarree (young Oromo women) non-violent grassroots movements were misrepresented as "extremists and terrorists". They said that local offices of Oromia Media Network and Oromo News Network were raided. Journalists were arrested following the Hachalu Hundessa riots and the Internet was cut, leading to a media monopoly for state-aligned Amharic media and a simplistic narrative of Oromos killing Amharas. Bontu and Martha interpreted the media presentation of Oromos as perpetrators as a deliberate and Orwellian plan.

Martha criticised the pan-Ethiopian feminist Sehin Teferra for "categorical[ly] associat[es]" the Qeerroo with violence. Martha criticised this as hiding the diversity among Qeerroos. Martha sees the Qeeroos and Qarrees as peaceful protestors that helped overthrow the Ethiopian People's Revolutionary Democratic Front (EPRDF).
