= Jibat =

Administrative division of Ethiopia

Jibat is one of the woredas in the Oromia Region of Ethiopia. It was part of Nono woreda. Part of the West Shewa Zone, Jibat is bordered on the south by the Nono, on the southeast by SouthWest Mirab Shewa Zone, on the east by Gurraacha Enchini, on the northeast by Toke Kutaye, on the west by Dano. The largest town is Shanan.

== Demographics ==
The 2007 national census reported this woreda's total population as 72,210, of whom 35,892 were men and 36,318 women; 3,629 or 5.03% of its population were urban dwellers. The majority of the inhabitants (55.92%) said they practised Ethiopian Orthodox Christianity, while 36.08% of the population were Protestant, and 6.55% practiced traditional beliefs.
