= I Will Not Regret =

2024 memoir by Jawar Mohammed

- Author: Jawar Mohammed
- Language: Amharic; Oromo
- Subject: Jawar's life and his imprisonment by the Ethiopian government
- Genre: Political memoir
- Published: 19 December 2024
- Publisher: HBD Publishing
- Publication place: Kenya
- Pages: 500
- ISBN: 9798895875704

I Will Not Regret (Amharic: አልፀፀትም, Oromo: Hin Gaabbu) is a 2024 memoir by Ethiopian political activist Jawar Mohammed, unveiled on 19 December 2024 in Nairobi, Kenya. It accounts Jawar's life and his difficulty in Oromo activism and the government persecutions. The book, which consists of 500 pages, details Jawar's imprisonment following the Hachalu Hundessa riots in 2020.

Commenting the reason of why the book was released in Kenya, Jawar said "The rulers were not happy,” he said. "Given the current situation in our country, I did not want to get into trouble for the sake of a book".

== Synopsis ==
The book was written in Amharic (translated as አልፀፀትም) and Oromo (Hin Gaabbu) and consists of 500 page. Generally, the memoir reflects Jawar's life and career as an activist and embodies his struggle for Oromo independence and his imprisonment and torture by the Ethiopian government. This account includes the aftermath of Hachalu Hundessa riots, where Oromo singer Hachalu Hundessa was assassinated on 29 June 2020.

Jawar began his writing during his 18-month imprisonment following the unrest. In 2024, Jawar revealed to BBC interview that he smuggled pages out of a prison with assistance of prison guards, explaining "At first, when I asked for paper, it was denied,” he said. “But a police officer gave me a notebook, and I started writing. Later, in Qaliti prison, writing was not prohibited, though taking the pages out was a challenge". Jawar opted the book unveiling in Kenya than Ethiopia because of political persecution of Abiy government, "The rulers were not happy,” he said. "Given the current situation in our country, I did not want to get into trouble for the sake of a book".

Initially, Jawar decided to release the book in Europe, but due to the support of Oromo diaspora in Kenya, he shifted the release in Nairobi on 19 December 2024. He highlighted that the book should be read in good times in political situation, commenting "I had hoped that after the war had subsided, people could read the book in peace. But things are getting worse, not better. People who knew the book was ready were pressuring me to publish it."
