= 2014 Addis Ababa Master Plan =

Plan to expand boundary of Ethiopian capital

The 2014 Addis Ababa Master Plan was a controversial plan to expand the boundaries of Ethiopian capital, Addis Ababa, by 1.1 million hectares into the Oromia Special Zone in April 2014. The plan was met with protests, particularly in the Oromia Region, with critics saying it would violate the 1995 Constitution.

== Background ==
The Oromia Special Zone Surrounding Finfinne was established in 2008 from parts of several zones in Oromia surrounding Addis Ababa. In 2011, Addis Ababa and the Oromia Special Zone established a joint project on common urban development issues, led by Kuma Demeksa.

The Ethiopian government, at the time led by the TPLF, met with other stakeholders in Adama in June 2013. They voiced their support for the project, claiming it was in Ethiopia's interest. The plan to expand the capital was done to accommodate the increasing demand for residential and commercial properties, because of a growing middle-class in Ethiopia. The integration of Addis Ababa and the Oromia Special Zone would violate the 1995 Constitution (which demarcated the capital from Oromia), and so it needed to be bypassed. By April 2014, the government was prepared to implement the Master Plan (which would seize surrounding town without consulting affected communities). This triggered protests from university students in Oromia, which were repressed by the government.

== Protests ==
The proposed expansion of the boundaries of Addis Ababa ignited the 2014–2016 Oromo protests beginning on 25 April 2014; to which the government responded by shooting at and beating peaceful protesters. More widespread strikes and street protests resumed on 12 November 2015; largely led by students in Ginchi (located 80 km southwest of Addis Ababa and encircled by the Oromia region). Protests spread throughout 400 different locales across 17 zones of the Oromia region, and according to Amnesty International 800 of these protestors were killed.

On 12 January 2016, after two months of protests, the Oromo Democratic Party said that the plan was “fully terminated” after extensive meetings with government officials who rejected it.

== See also ==
- 2014–2016 Oromo protests
- Qeerroo
