= Toke Kutaye =

Administrative division of Ethiopia

Toke Kuatye is one of the Aanaas in the Oromia region of Ethiopia. It was part of Naannawa Ambo. Part of the West Shewa Zone, Toke Kutaye is bordered on the east by the Ambo Zuria, on the north by Midakegn, on the west by Cheliya. The largest town is Guder.

== Demographics ==
The 2007 national census reported this woreda's population as 119,999, of whom 59,798 were men and 60,201 women; 15,952 or 13.29% of its population were urban dwellers. The majority of the inhabitants (49.48%) said they practised Ethiopian Orthodox Christianity, while 32.8% of the population were Protestant, and 16.25% practiced traditional beliefs.
