= Guder =

Town located in Oromia state of Ethiopia

Guder Gudar (Oromo)
- Town
- Location within Ethiopia Guder (Africa)
- Coordinates: 8°58′N 37°46′E
- Country: Ethiopia
- Region: Oromia
- Zone: West Shewa Zone
- Woreda: Naannawa Ambo
- Time zone: UTC+3 (EAT)

Guder is a town located in the West Shewa Zone of the Oromia of Ethiopia. Located 12km west of Ambo, this town has a latitude and longitude of 8°58′N 37°46′E, with an elevation of 2101 meters above sea level. Guder is famous for its Guder River Falls and year-round fruit production, using plentiful water resources in the vicinity.

== Demographics ==
Based on figures from the Central Statistical Agency in 2005, Guder has an estimated total population of 17,084 of whom 8,272 are men and 8,812 women. It is one of five towns in Naannawa Ambo woreda.

The 1994 census reported this town had a total population of 9,562, of whom 4,486 were men and 5,076 women. The five largest ethnic groups reported in Guder were the Oromo (83.79%), and the Amhara (12.34%); all other ethnic groups made up 3.87% of the population. Oromo was spoken as a first language by 79.15%, and 18.92% spoke Amharic; the remaining 1.93% spoke all other primary languages reported. The majority of the inhabitants (86.96%) professed Ethiopian Orthodox Christianity, while 9.39% of the population said they were Protestant, and 2.53% were Muslim.
