= Awol Allo =

Ethiopian academic and author

Awol Kasim Allo is an Ethiopian academic, author and lecturer who started teaching law at University of Keele in 2016.

== Early life and education ==
Awol Kasim Allo was born in the village of Wate-Chimmo near Gassera in the former Bale Province in Ethiopia. He attended Batu Terara High School in Goba. He obtained a law degree at Addis Ababa University in 2006, a master's degree at the University of Notre Dame in 2008, and his PhD at the University of Glasgow in 2013, specialising in the "role of law and legal institutions in enabling progressive social and political change". He is an Oromo Muslim. Sehin described Awol as a charming, Western-educated intellectual and knows his impact as a political expert.

== Academic career ==
Awol taught at the LSE starting in 2013. He started a tenure track position at Keele University in September 2016. As of November 2020, Awol held British citizenship.

In 2019, Awol started a research project into "medemer and solidarity", where "medemer" is a "notion ... similar to the notion of solidarity" proposed by Abiy Ahmed after becoming prime minister of Ethiopia. Awol wished to see if medemer could aid in democratisation and peaceful coexistence in Ethiopia.

=== Points of view ===
Awol was supportive of Abiy Ahmed, who became prime minister of Ethiopia in 2018, nominating him successfully for the Nobel Peace Prize in 2019. Awol became a critic of Abiy in 2020. Awol stated in international media outlets like Al Jazeera, CNN and the BBC criticising what he saw as Abiy's growing authoritarianism, the repression of journalists and political dissidents in Ethiopia. Awol has also accused Abiy of favouring centralisation against federalism and of being motivated by the desire for centralised control of power in the decision to launch an attack by the Ethiopian National Defense Force (ENDF) against the Tigray Region in November 2020. An Ethiopian arrest warrant against Awol was issued in late November 2020.

=== Truth commission ===
In 2019, Awol stated that he was supportive of the creation of the Ethiopian Reconciliation Commission to help in transitional justice, but warned of risks. He summarised the experience of other countries that had had truth commissions, stating that "the tension between accountability/justice and peace are one of the most well-known and inevitable of contradictions faced by almost all transitional societies."

=== Regional and federal democracy in Ethiopia ===
In 2019, Awol called for Oromo political groups to participate in organising politically in preparation for election, to "enter into coalitions and engage in constructive politics". He stated that "No mature and decent leadership can resort to violence under any condition" and warned that "engag[ing] in sabotaging the transition for short term political gains" would cause all groups to lose.

Awol stated in 2019 that he saw the federal government as showing "significant levels of patience" in compromising with regional governments and in not using its full legal powers of arrest of federal crime suspects."

In 2020, Awol's view of the federal government evolved to see it as becoming authoritarian (see #Awol's view on the Tigray conflict below). In November 2020 he saw the Tigray People's Liberation Front (TPLF, the former ruling party until 2018) as "an outspoken and powerful defender" of a federal structure in Ethiopia.

=== Views on the Tigray war ===
Awol, who had been one of the nominees of Abiy Ahmed for the Nobel Peace Prize, described Abiy as becoming increasingly authoritarian during the late 2020 Tigray conflict, repressing journalists and political dissidents. Awol opposed the sending of the Ethiopian National Defense Force (ENDF) to take control of the Tigray Region.

On 25 November 2020, Awol described the conflict as "a deadly civil war that [was] threatening to destabilise an already fragile and volatile region". Awol interpreted the ENDF actions as "an all-out war on a regional government as a means to settle an ideological and political difference". Awol stated that the war in Tigray continued the "violent and widespread repression" that had begun earlier in Oromia Region, Wolayita Zone and Sidama Region "against those who resisted" Abiy's program. He said "after silencing dissent and opposition elsewhere in the country, Abiy and his camp are turning to Tigray, the last frontier in the battle over the character of the Ethiopian state". Awol saw a fundamental opposition between "Abiy's vision of a centralised and unitary state" versus a constitutional division of power between a central government and autonomous regional governments. Awol described the "Amharas and the Amhara elite" as supporting the ENDF actions with the aims of retaking land and of reimposing and assimilationist system of excluding non-Amhara culture.

Awol stated that, "As a Nobel laureate, Abiy had the moral and political obligation to rule out war as a means of settling a political dispute. There can be no military solution to the ideological differences between Abiy and the TPLF."

In late November 2020, Ethiopian authorities issued arrest warrants for Awol and seven other Ethiopian intellectuals for what the government called "using a variety of media outlets to destroy the country".

== Ethiopian government arrest warrant ==
Abiy Ahmed's government issued arrest warrants for Awol in December 2020, along with seven other Ethiopian activists, writers and academics, for publicly criticizing Mr Abiy's decision to send the Ethiopia powerful federal army into the country's Tigray region to oust the regional government there on 4 November 2020. "I am not surprised at all by this news. Abiy Ahmed has shown that he is very intolerant of any kind of dissent or criticism. It's not just Awol Allo who he has targeted. He is arresting people left, right and centre. In my opinion, he is a dictator in the making," said Yohannes Woldemariam, an academic focusing on the Horn of Africa. "I think the Nobel Committee made a very big mistake. They saw Abiy smiling and he dresses well. I guess he has some currency these days. They were looking for an Africa success story. That's why they gave him the peace prize but there is no peace. Ethiopia is basically an empire which is fracturing apart." The Ethiopian government said the arrest warrant was for "using a variety of media outlets to destroy the country".

Abiy's government also deported the British citizen International Crisis Group’s Ethiopia Senior Analyst William Davison. No formal reason was immediately given, but his expulsion doubtless relates to the serious Tigray conflict and increasing sensitivity to non-official points of view.

According to Human Rights Watch, Committee to Protect Journalists and Amnesty International, since the start of the Tigray conflict, Abiy's government intensified its arrests of Ethiopian journalists and the closing media outlets, which had started mid 2019. Furthermore, in November 2020, the authorities suspended the press licence of Reuters correspondent, and issued a warning letter to the correspondents of both BBC and Deutsche Welle for what the government described as "violation of the rules of media broadcasting".

== Criticism ==
Awol has been criticised by Sehin Teferra as incorrectly rejecting the existence of an Ethiopian identity by misrepresenting it. and as being a bigot for denying the right of Ethiopians to see themselves as having an Ethiopian identity. Sehin accused Awol of having "fanned the flames of ethnic bigotry" in relation to the June 2020 Hachalu Hundessa riots that followed the murder of Oromo singer Hachalu Hundessa.

While Awol saw the arrests of Jawar Mohammed and Bekele Gerba in relation to the Hachalu Hundessa protests as Abiy making the Oromia Region "leaderless", Sehin saw Awol's view as support for violence and a refusal to consider evidence.
