= Early reforms of Abiy Ahmed =

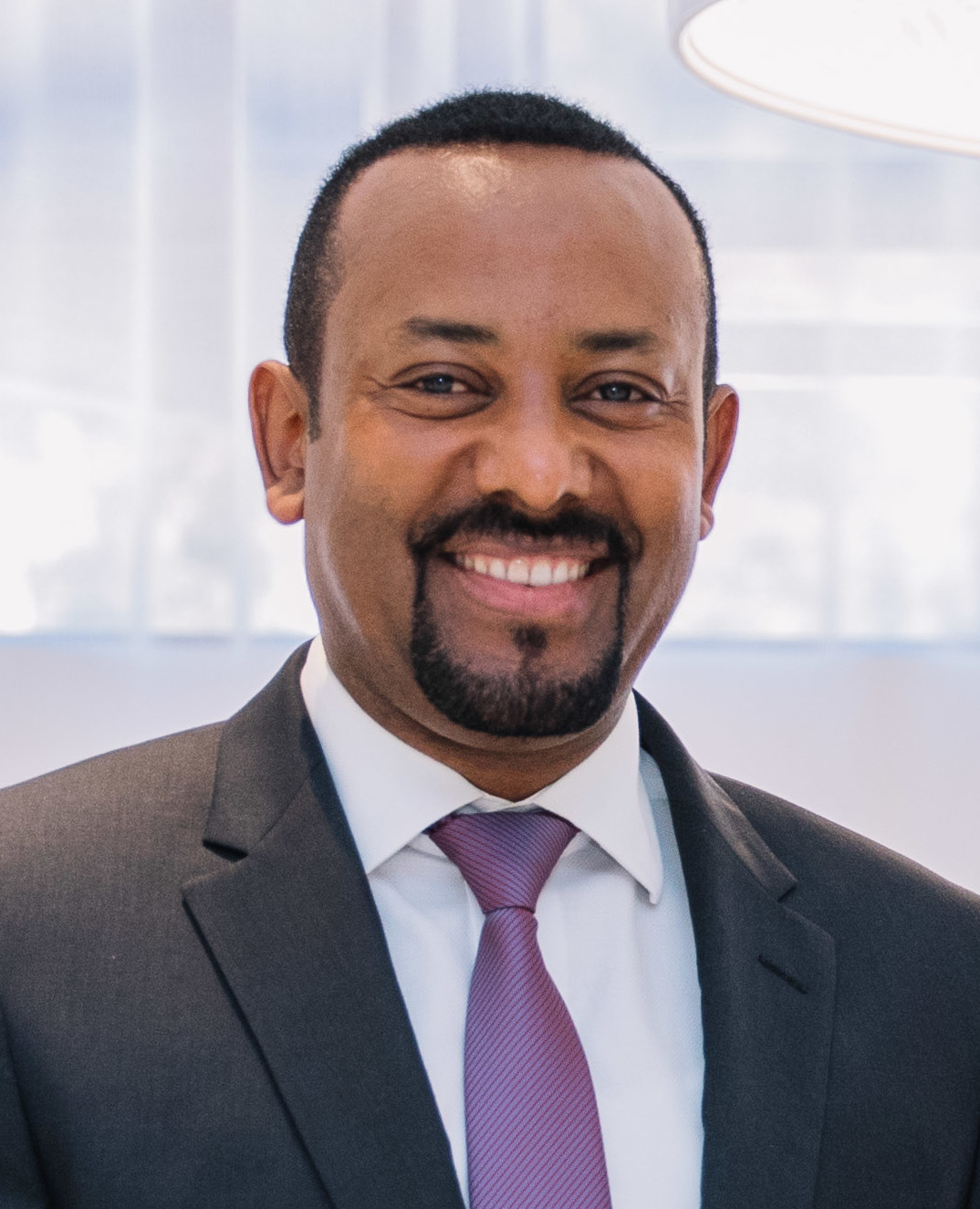
Abiy Ahmed in 2018

Early reforms of Ethiopian Prime Minister Abiy Ahmed were largely the setback of the former Ethiopian People's Revolutionary Democratic Front (EPRDF) regime policies. Since he took office in April 2018, Abiy made secure for the release of thousands political prisoners, dissents and journalists domestically and aboard. Many exiled opponents of the former regime returned to the country and parties like Ginbot 7, the Oromo Liberation Front (OLF) and the Ogaden National Liberation Front (ONLF) has been delisted from terrorist database.

Ethiopia's relations with Eritrea was friendly during his premiership, with ultimate peace agreement signed in September 2018. The July 2018 summit of the two countries ended the two decades of Ethiopia–Eritrea border conflict. For those contributions, Abiy was awarded the 2019 Nobel Peace Prize. In economy, Abiy made major reforms toward liberalization of companies and firms. Among these, companies like Ethio telecom and Ethiopian Airlines have been partially privatized under monopoly.

== Political reform ==
Abiy Ahmed's first few months saw the reform of human rights with hope of ending instabilities and protests in Oromia region and authoritarianism under EPRDF rule. At the age of 41, Abiy made the release of thousands of political prisoners, dissents and journalists. In May 2018, Abiy secured the release of 1,000 jailed Ethiopians in Saudi Arabia. Also, in June, he visited Cairo and secured the release 32 imprisoned Ethiopians there. The Ethiopian Parliament also considered opposition parties like Ginbot 7, the Oromo Liberation Front (OLF) and the Ogaden National Liberation Front (ONLF) no longer to be terrorist groups.

As of June 2018, more than 1,000 prisoners were released since Abiy took office in April. On 6 August, Ethiopia signed a deal with the OLF leaders in Asmara, Eritrea to end hostility and internal conflict. The deal was described as to improve security and diplomatic relations, reform institutions and open parts of the state-controlled economy. However, the deal was not successful as it paved for the emergence of Qeerroo movement and insurgency of OLF wing, the Oromo Liberation Army (OLA) in the latter years.

=== Relations with Eritrea ===
Abiy ended the two decades hostile relations between Ethiopia and Eritrea. On 8 June 2018, the so called Jeddah Agreement began between Abiy and the Eritrean President Isaias Afwerki in Jeddah. Abiy accepted the ruling of the International Arbitration Court on the demarcation of borders. on 17 September, a peace pact was signed, which many officials described it as historic deal to renovate diplomatic relations of the two countries.

The 2018 Eritrea–Ethiopia summit that took place from 8 to 9 July 2018 in Asmara, was critical instrument to end their hostility. Abiy agreed to cede Badme town to Eritrea. In October 2019, Abiy was awarded Nobel Peace Prize for his contribution of ending stalemate between Eritrea and Ethiopia.

== Economic reform ==
Since taking office, Abiy promised to reform companies like Ethio telecom and Ethiopian Airlines by monopolization. He believed the liberalization of telecom sectors will positively impact the economy. The strategy could help to establish better private sector, boost competition, and increase investment. Some international companies also invited to join the market. For instance, the French logistics company Groupe Bollore allowed to enter the market while awaiting to handle license for customs clearance.
