= Midakegn =

Administrative division of Ethiopia

Midakegn is one of the woredas in the Oromia Region of Ethiopia. It is part of the West Shewa Zone. It was part of Cheliya woreda. The woreda is bordered on the east by Naannawa Ambo, on the south by Toke Kutaye, on the southwest and west by Cheliya, and on the north by Horo Guduru Welega Zone.

== Demographics ==
The 2007 national census reported the woreda population as 79,580, of whom 39,205 were men and 40,375 women; 2,078 or 2.61% of its population were urban dwellers. The majority of the inhabitants said they were Protestant, with 46.79% of the population reporting they observed this belief, while 36.71% of the population practiced Ethiopian Orthodox Christianity, and 15.34% practiced traditional religions.
