= Nono, West Shewa, Oromia =

District in Oromia Region, Ethiopia

Coordinates: 8°30′N 37°30′E

Nono is one of the woredas in the Oromia Region of Ethiopia. It is named after the Nono Oromo, a subgroup of the Macha Oromo, who live in this area. Part of the West Shewa Zone, Nono is bordered on the southwest by the Gibe River which separates it from the Jimma Zone, on the northwest by Dano, on the north by Cheliya, on the northeast by Tikur, on the east by the Southwest Shewa Zone, and on the southeast by the Southern Nations, Nationalities and Peoples Region. Jibat woreda was part of Nono woreda. It consists of many kebele which is dominated by farmers. Nono was selected by the Ministry of Agriculture and Rural Development in 2003 as an area for voluntary resettlement for farmers from overpopulated areas. That year this woreda became the home for a total of 590 heads of households and 391 total family members. The settlers included 861 individuals (693 family head and 168 family members) who came from Dodotana Sire, Hitosa, Merti, and Ziway Dugda woredas in the Arsi Zone. The next year this woreda was selected again as a resettlement area, and became the home of a total of 2370 heads of household and a total of 16,350 family members.

== Demographics ==
The 2007 national census reported a total population for this woreda of 84,248, of whom 43,545 were men and 40,703 women; 3,554 or 4.22% of its population were urban dwellers. The majority of the inhabitants (55.64%) said they practised Ethiopian Orthodox Christianity, while 25.85% of the population were Muslim, and 15.38% were Protestant.

Based on figures published by the Central Statistical Agency in 2005, this woreda has an estimated total population of 129,150, of whom 65,252 are men and 63,898 are women; 4,225 or 3.27% of its population are urban dwellers, which is less than the Zone average of 12.3%. With an estimated area of 1,248.75 square kilometers, Nono has an estimated population density of 103.4 people per square kilometer, which is less than the Zone average of 152.8.

The 1994 national census reported a total population for this woreda of 93,291, of whom 46,435 were men and 46,856 women; 2,368 or 2.54% of its population were urban dwellers at the time. The two largest ethnic groups reported in Nono were the Oromo (83%), and the Amhara (16.26%); all other ethnic groups made up 0.74% of the population. Oromiffa was spoken as a first language by 85.47%, and 14.15% spoke Amharic; the remaining 0.38% spoke all other primary languages reported. The majority of the inhabitants professed Ethiopian Orthodox Christianity, with 83.62% of the population reporting they practiced that belief, while 7.09% of the population said they were Protestant, 6.92% were Moslem, and 1.49% practiced traditional beliefs.
