= Gurraacha Enchini =

District in Oromia, Ethiopia

Coordinates: 8°45′N 37°40′E

Dirre Incinni is one of the districts in the Oromia region of Ethiopia. Part of the West Shewa Zone, it is bordered on the southwest by Nono, on the northwest by Cheliya, on the northeast by Ambo, and on the southeast by the Southwest Shewa Zone. The major town in Dirre Incinni is Incinni.

== Demographics ==
The 2007 national census reported a total population for this district of 71,417, of whom 35,420 were men and 35,997 were women; 4,358 or 6.1% of its population were urban dwellers. The majority of the inhabitants said they practised Ethiopian Orthodox Christianity, with 44.05% of the population reporting they observed this belief, while 39.35% of the population were Protestant, and 16.06% practiced traditional religions.

Based on figures published by the Central Statistical Agency in 2005, this district has an estimated total population of 97,639, of whom 50,088 are men and 47,551 are women; 3,595 or 3.68% of its population are urban dwellers, which is less than the Zone average of 12.3%. With an estimated area of 538.13 square kilometers, Tikur has an estimated population density of 181.4 people per square kilometer, which is greater than the Zone average of 152.8.

The 1994 national census reported a total population for this district of 70,456, of whom 34,518 were men and 35,938 women; 2,015 or 2.86% of its population were urban dwellers at the time. The two largest ethnic groups reported in Tikur were the Oromo (97.93%), and the Amhara (1.53%); all other ethnic groups made up 0.54% of the population. Oromo was spoken as a first language by 99.42%. The majority of the inhabitants professed Ethiopian Orthodox Christianity, with 84.7% of the population reporting they practiced that belief, while 9.01% of the population said they practiced traditional beliefs, and 6.01% were Protestant.

== Oromo liberation war (2021) ==
On 9 July 2021, Enchini was liberated by the Oromo Liberation Army
