= Dano (woreda) =

District in the Oromia Region of Ethiopia

Coordinates: 8°40′N 37°20′E

Dano is one of the woredas in the Oromia Region of Ethiopia. Part of the Mirab Shewa Zone, Dano is bordered on the southwest by the Jimma Zone, on the north by Cheliya, and on the southeast by Nono; part of the boundary with the Jimma Zone is defined by the Gibe River. The major town in Dano is Sayo.

Although coffee is an important cash crop of this woreda, less than 20 square kilometers are planted with this crop.

== Demographics ==
The 2007 national census reported this woreda's total population as 97,243, of whom 48,593 were men and 48,650 women; 6,072 or 6.24% of its population were urban dwellers. The majority of the inhabitants (53.43%) said they were Protestant, while 37.1% of the population practised Ethiopian Orthodox Christianity, and 8.2% were Muslim.

Based on figures published by the Central Statistical Agency in 2005, this woreda has an estimated total population of 82,575, of whom 42,056 are men and 40,519 are women; 3,197 or 3.87% of its population are urban dwellers, which is less than the Zone average of 12.3%. With an estimated area of 667.19 square kilometers, Dano has an estimated population density of 123.8 people per square kilometer, which is less than the Zone average of 152.8.

The 1994 national census reported a total population for this woreda of 59,559, of whom 29,385 were men and 30,174 women; 1,789 or 3% of its population were urban dwellers at the time. The two largest ethnic groups reported in Dano were the Oromo (92.24%), and the Amhara (7.56%); all other ethnic groups made up 0.96% of the population. Oromiffa was spoken as a first language by 94.43%, and 5.53% spoke Amharic; the remaining 0.04% spoke all other primary languages reported. The majority of the inhabitants professed Ethiopian Orthodox Christianity, with 77.17% of the population reporting they practiced that belief, while 23.2% of the population said they were Protestant, 5.04% were Muslim, and 2.41% practiced traditional beliefs.
