= Cheliya =

Aanaas in the Oromia of Ethiopia

Coordinates: 9°00′N 37°30′E

Cheliya is one of the Aanaas in the Oromia of Ethiopia. Part of the West Shewa Zone, Cheliya is bordered on the south by Nono and Dano, on the southwest by the Gibe River which separates it from the Jimma Zone, on the west by Bako Tibe, on the northwest by the Guder River which separates it from the Horo Gudru Welega Zone, on the north by Ginde Beret, on the northeast by Jeldu, on the east by Ambo, and on the southeast by Tikur. The administrative center of this Aanaa is Gedo; other towns in Cheliya include Babiche, Ejaji, and Hamus Gebeya. Midakegn woreda was separated form Cheliya.

== Overview ==
Prominent peaks in this woreda include Mount Tulluu Maraa (3128 meters); rivers include the Racho and Walshomo. Local landmarks of note include the Gedo State Forest. A survey of the land in Cheliya shows that 87.4% is arable or cultivable, 7.2% pasture, 2.98% forest, and 2.42% other. Although coffee is an important cash crop of this woreda, less than 2,000 hectares are planted with this crop.

There are 39 primary schools in this woreda, 18 providing education for grades 1-4 and 21 providing education for grades 1–8, and two secondary education schools, both providing education for grades 9–12. Health services are provided by one health center and two clinics; these facilities are ill-equipped and under-staffed, making them insufficient to reach the entire population.

== Demographics ==
The 2007 national census reported a total population for this woreda of 156,962, of whom 78,562 were men and 78,400 women; 22,745 or 14.49% of its population were urban dwellers. The majority of the inhabitants (54.38%) said they were Protestant, while 32.76% of the population practised Ethiopian Orthodox Christianity, and 5.48% practiced traditional religions.

Based on figures published by the Central Statistical Agency in 2005, this woreda has an estimated total population of 240,055, of whom 122,182 are men and 117,873 are women; 26,619 or 11.09% of its population are urban dwellers, which is less than the Zone average of 12.3%. With an estimated area of 1,854.07 square kilometers, Cheliya has an estimated population density of 129.5 people per square kilometer, which is less than the Zone average of 152.8.

The 1994 national census reported a total population for this woreda of 170,216, of whom 83,809 were men and 86,407 women; 14,885 or 8.74% of its population were urban dwellers at the time. The two largest ethnic groups reported in Cheliya were the Oromo (96.19%), and the Amhara (3.14%); all other ethnic groups made up 0.67% of the population. The Oromo language was spoken as a first language by 97%, and 2.76% spoke Amharic; the remaining 0.24% spoke all other primary languages reported. The majority of the inhabitants professed Ethiopian Orthodox Christianity, with 68.2% of the population reporting they practiced that belief, while 15.8% of the population said they were Protestant, 11.67% practiced traditional beliefs, and 3.99% were Muslim.
