= 2016–2018 Ethiopian state of emergency =

State of emergency in Ethiopia

- Date: 9 October 2016 – 5 June 2018
- Location: Ethiopia
- Cause: 2014–2016 Oromo protests
- Outcome: Extended twice, on 28 March 2017 and 15 February 2018; Lifted by Abiy Ahmed administration

A state of emergency was declared on 9 October 2016 by Ethiopian Prime Minister Hailemariam Desalegn, after de facto taking effect the previous day. The state of emergency authorized the military to enforce security nationwide. It imposed restrictions on freedom of speech and access to information. The duration was initially announced for six months. The Constitution of Ethiopia provides for a six-month state of emergency under certain conditions. The declaration of the state of emergency followed massive protests by the Oromo and Amhara ethnic groups against the government, which was dominated by the Tigray People's Liberation Front, largely consisting of Tigrayans, a smaller ethnic group. The 2016 state of emergency was the first in about 25 years in Ethiopia. In March 2017, Ethiopia's parliament voted to extend the state of emergency for another four months.

== Historical background ==
After the downfall of Mengistu Haile Mariam's military regime in 1991, the Ethiopian People’s Revolutionary Democratic Front took over the state. The first thing it did was implement a Federal system of government in the country, a difficult task because the country was a unitary state for more than three thousand years. After implementing the federal system, there was different ethnic based conflicts over natural resources, lands, and others factors.

A couple of months before the state of emergency was declared, U.S. State Department officials criticized Ethiopia (historically a strong ally) for how it was dealing with protestors. U.S. Ambassador on human rights Tom Malinkowski wrote (in remarks later attributed to Secretary of State Kerry by the L.A. Times) "security forces have continued to use excessive force to prevent Ethiopians from congregating peacefully, killing and injuring many people and arresting thousands."

== Oromo opposition and Amhara resistance ==
After 25 years of leading this country, the Ethiopian government is facing opposition from all directions of the country. The two major ethnic groups—the Oromo and the Amhara—together represent approximately 61.4% of the country’s population, and the Oromo started a resistance movement against the Tigray-dominated government that began in November 2015. This movement went to different parts of the country. Corruption, poor administration, injustice, lack of equal economic benefits and losing their land in the name of investments are some of the causes that triggered the movement. The situation with the opposition became particularly difficult in October 2016. Due to corruption in the country, human rights violations and lack of equal economic benefits, the opposition has been accepted by most protesters. On October 2, there was an annual Oromo religious festival called Irreechaa, a festival where people from the entire Oromia region come and give thanks to their God in a city named Bishoftu. Bishoftu is approximately 50 km (30 miles) from Addis Ababa, Ethiopia's capital. During this festival people all Oromo people come to give thanks to their god. In this event, people started shouting and showing different signs and protesting the government. Police fired tear gas into a crowd of people protesting the government at this festival, which was attended by approximately two million people; this resulted in a stampede and more than 50 deaths.

== FDRE constitution ==
According to the Ethiopian constitution, the council of ministers has the power to declare the State of Emergency under three conditions: 1) during foreign invasion, 2) during a natural disaster or natural epidemic, and 3) when there is a breakdown of the country’s law and regulation which will endanger the constitutional order.

== Impacts ==
The declaration of State of Emergency creates fear in most people. Most adults in the country have a bad experience with states of emergency. During the dictatorial Derg regime the government used violence to quell dissent. There was a state of emergency in which they put curfews on cities. During this time, the police went to different houses and did whatever they wanted. Due to this bad memory, most people get home early. Whereas, others have said “it’s a key to safety”, and the country’s security became better after the declaration of the state of emergency. However, most business in big cities of the country have decreased due to the blockage of internet services. Tourist traffic outside the capital city, Addis Ababa, decreases due to different security reasons. Additionally, most people who live in cities prefer to stay home or go home early rather than working. Most economists also predict that this declaration will highly affect the income of the only internet service provider in the country called Ethio telecom.

=== Restrictions on communication ===
The government tightened restrictions on internet use during the state of emergency. The government shut down the internet for several days, criminalized reporting on protests via social media, and criminalized communicating with exiled dissidents (which are classified by the government as terrorists).

=== Arrests, releases and trials ===
Within two weeks of announcing a state of emergency, the government, by its own count had arrested 1,645 people. Merera Gudina, an Oromo opposition leader, was arrested after testifying before the European Parliament. On November 12, 2016, the government announced the names and reasons for arrest for 11,067 people who were arrested. In late December, Voice of America reported that the government was releasing over 9,000 people who had been arrested since the start of the state of emergency; the government planned to arraign 2,449 others. Deutsche Welle reported in February 2017 that the government claims 20,000 people are arrested in Oromia, while opposition groups claim 70,000 people are arrested; the government has indicated it will release 22,000 prisoners, having released 11,000 prisoners on February 3.

== See also ==
- 2021 Ethiopian state of emergency
- 2023 Ethiopian state of emergency
