= Naannawa Ambo =

District of Ethiopia

Coordinates: 9°00′N 37°45′E

Naannawa Ambo is one of the districts in the Oromia region of Ethiopia. Part of the West Shaggar Zone, it is bordered on the southwest by Gurraacha Enchini, on the west by Cheliya, on the north by Kutaye-Liban, on the northeast by Jeldu, on the east by Dendi, and on the southeast by the Southwest Shewa Zone. The administrative center of this woreda is Ambo; other towns include Gorosile and Meti. Ambo Zuria and Toke Kutaye woredas and Ambo town were part of former Ambo woreda.

== Overview ==
One of the high points in this woreda is Mount Wanchi (3386 meters). Coffee is an important cash crop of Ambo; over 50 square kilometers are planted with this crop.

This woreda is home to Dr. Merera Gudina, the founder and chairman of the Oromo People's Congress (OPC). Although the OPC has a large following in Ambo, Human Rights Watch has received reports of kebele officials imprisoning people for campaigning for or providing support to the OPC, or expelling students from school for the same.

== Demographics ==
The 2007 national census reported this woreda's total population as 108,406, of whom 54,186 were men and 54,220 women; 865 or 0.8% of its population were urban dwellers. The majority of the inhabitants (51.82%) said they practised Ethiopian Orthodox Christianity, while 32% of the population practiced traditional religions, and 15.9% were Protestant.

Based on figures published by the Central Statistical Agency in 2005, this woreda has an estimated total population of 260,193, of whom 131,922 are men and 128,271 women; 70,675 or 27.16% of its population are urban dwellers, which is greater than the Zone average of 12.3%. With an estimated area of 1,588.13 square kilometers, Ambo has an estimated population density of 163.8 people per square kilometer, which is greater than the Zone average of 152.8.

The 1994 national census reported a total population for this woreda of 177,465, of whom 87,325 were men and 90,140 women; 39,535 or 22.28% of its population were urban dwellers at the time. The two largest ethnic groups reported in Ambo were the Oromo (92.58%), and the Amhara (5.76%); all other ethnic groups made up 1.16% of the population. Oromiffa was spoken as a first language by 90.92%, and 8.37% spoke Amharic; the remaining 0.81% spoke all other primary languages reported. The majority of the inhabitants professed Ethiopian Orthodox Christianity, with 74.16% of the population reporting they practiced that belief, while 18.77% of the population said they held traditional beliefs, and 6.07% were Protestant.
