= Oromia Media Network =

Ethiopian Oromo-language television channel

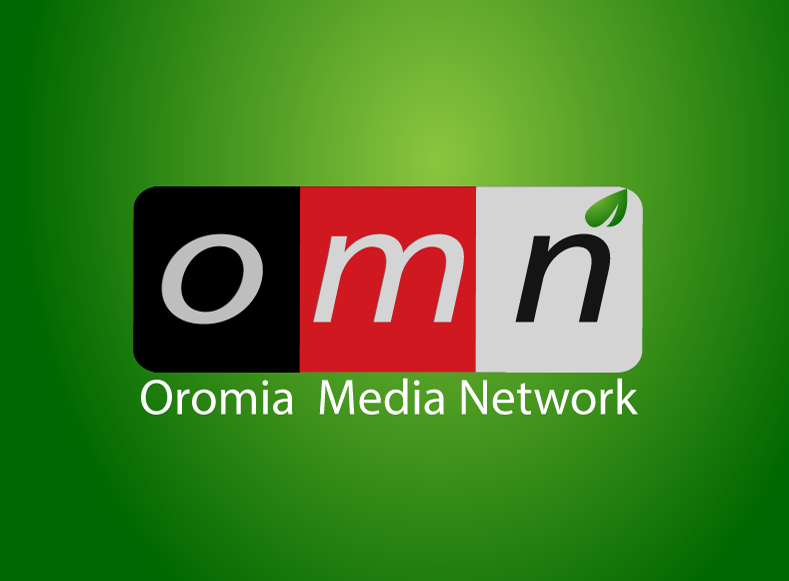
- Country: United States, Ethiopia

Programming
- Language(s): Oromo; Amharic; English

History
- Launched: 2013; 12 years ago

Links
- Website: www.oromiamedia.com

The Oromia Media Network (OMN) is an Oromo news channel headquartered in Minneapolis, Minnesota, U.S.. OMN is established as a non-profit independent media outlet 501(c)(3) organization, licensed under the Federal Communications Commission funded by public donors from the broader Oromo diaspora.

== History ==
Jawar Mohammed established the OMN following a movement which he called "Oromo first". The "Oromo first” movement later grew into a political campaign, raising funds to establish the satellite TV station, launched 2013, along with Facebook and Twitter accounts using the brand Oromia Media Network (OMN). During the launch, Jawar Mohammed was appointed as an Executive Director.

OMN was inaugurated on 1 March 2014. Jawar in his inaugural speech said "We've now liberated the airwaves of Oromia. We will liberate the land in the coming years." On 1 January 2020, Jawar stepped down from his position on at OMN to join the Oromo Federalist Congress and has since been replaced by Girma Gutama.

OMN grew to become an influential voice of the youth, known as Qeerroo, a label which was created in 1990s the Oromo Liberation Front (OLF). OMN and ESAT were both targeted by the Ethiopian government which used Spywares to target journalists working for the stations.

The OMN is one of the media outlets which broadcast to Ethiopian audiences from abroad, along with the ESAT. After the drop of charges against the OMN and its executive director on 29 May 2018, the inauguration of the Addis Ababa office was held in the presence of Oromia Regional State Chief Administrator Lemma Megersa at the Millennium Hall on 5 August 2018. Lemma in his inaugural speech said "OMN has played a big role in bringing tangible change in the regional state."

In June 2020, following the death of Hachaluu Hundessa, riots reignited Oromo protests. Jawar Mohammed was then arrested on 30 June 2020, in Addis Ababa. OMN’s local office was raided by federal security agents and several journalists were detained. Hachalu gave an interview to the Oromia Media Network (OMN), which had sparked outrage on social media, a week before his murder. The interview was aired with live stream on Facebook, which was seen by 24,000 viewers.

== Programming ==
Most of its contents are from Ethiopia, but also covers some international news. The majority of broadcasts are in Oromo with some programs in Amharic and English. It has studios located in Minneapolis, Seattle, London, Melbourne and Cairo.
