= Hachalu Hundessa =

Ethiopian singer (1986–2020)

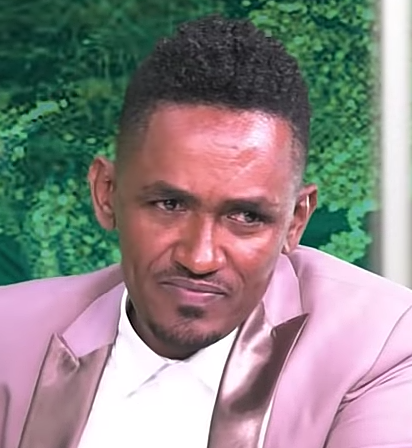
- Hachalu in 2018
- Born: 1986; Ambo, Ethiopia
- Died: 29 June 2020 (aged 33–34); Addis Ababa, Ethiopia
- Cause of death: Gunshot wounds
- Occupation: Singer-songwriter
- Years active: 2008–2020
- Spouse: Fantu Demisse
- Children: 2
- Parents: Gudatu Hora; Hundessa Bonsa
- Musical career
- Genres: Ethiopian music
- Instrument: Vocals
- Label: Aromfia Studios

Hachalu Hundessa (Oromo: Haacaaluu Hundeessaa Boonsaa; Amharic: ሃጫሉ ሁንዴሳ; 1986 – 29 June 2020) was an Ethiopian singer, songwriter, and civil rights activist. Hachalu played a significant role in the 2014–2016 Oromo protests that led to Abiy Ahmed taking charge of the Oromo Democratic Party and Ethiopian People's Revolutionary Democratic Front, and subsequently becoming prime minister of Ethiopia in 2018.

== Personal life ==
Hachalu Hundessa was born in Ambo in Oromia Region, Ethiopia, to Gudatu Hora and Hundessa Bonsa in 1986. The son of Oromo parents, Hundessa grew up singing in school clubs and tending cattle. In 2003, at the age of 17, he was arrested for taking part in protests. He was imprisoned at Karchale Ambo for five years and later released in 2008. He was married to Fantanesh Demisse, with whom he had two daughters. Hachalu was a lifelong member of the Ethiopian Orthodox Tewahedo Church.

== Career ==
Hachalu composed and wrote most of the lyrics of his first album while he was in prison. The album, Sanyii Mootii, was released in 2009. In 2013, he toured the United States and released his second album, Waa'ee Keenyaa, which was the #1 best-selling African music album on Amazon Music. Hachalu revealed that he was working on his third album, Maal Mallisaa, a week before his death. In 2021, the album was released on the anniversary of his death.

Hachalu's protest songs unified the Oromo people, encouraging them to resist oppression. His songs have been closely linked with anti-government resistance during the 2014–2016 Oromo protests. His ballad "Maalan Jira" (What existence is mine) concerned the displacement of Oromo people from Addis Ababa. Months after the single was released in June 2015, protests opposing the Addis Ababa Master Plan occurred throughout the Oromia Region. The song became an anthem for protesters as well as one of the most viewed Oromo music videos.

In December 2017, Hachalu sang at a concert in Addis Ababa that raised funds for 700,000 Oromo who were displaced by ethnic violence in Somali region. The concert was broadcast live by Oromia Broadcasting Network.

Hachalu's songs captured Oromo hopes and frustrations. According to lecturer Awol Allo, "Hachalu was the soundtrack of the Oromo revolution, a lyrical genius and an activist who embodied the hopes and aspirations of the Oromo public."

== Murder and aftermath ==
Hachalu was shot on the evening of 29 June 2020 at the Gelan Condominiums in Galan town, on the outskirts of Addis Ababa. He was taken to Tirunesh Beijing General Hospital, where he died. Thousands of mourners gathered at the hospital, as police used tear gas to disperse crowds. Two people were shot dead and seven others injured during the singer's funeral. Filenbar Uma, a member of the opposition Oromo Liberation Front in Ambo, described security forces shooting as "people were kept from going" to the funeral. Hachalu's casket was driven into the stadium in Ambo in a black car, accompanied by a brass band and men on horseback. He was later buried at an Ethiopian Orthodox church in the town, in accordance with his family's wishes. The police arrested several suspects in connection with the murder. Hachalu had reported receiving death threats, including in the week prior to his death, when he gave an interview to the Oromia Media Network.

Hachalu's death sparked protests throughout the Oromia Region, leading to the deaths of approximately 160 people. At demonstrations in Adama, nine protesters were killed and another 75 were injured. Two people were shot to death in Chiro, while protesters in Harar toppled a statue of prince Makonnen Wolde Mikael. On 30 June 2020, a statue of Emperor Haile Selassie in Cannizaro Park, Wimbledon, south-west London, was destroyed by Oromo protestors. Many people from Ethiopia's ethnic Oromo group say they were oppressed under Haile Selassie's reign. Hachalu's uncle was killed in the clashes. Rights groups have said three protesters were killed by security forces, while a doctor in Dire Dawa town said he treated eight people with gunshots fired by security forces to disperse protests.

At 9am, 30 June 2020, the internet in Ethiopia was largely taken down, a measure previously taken by the government during unrest. Prime Minister Abiy Ahmed expressed his condolences to Hachalu's family, urging calm amid growing unrest. Media magnate and activist Jawar Mohammed responded to Hachalu's death on Facebook, saying "They did not just kill Hachalu. They shot at the heart of the Oromo Nation, once again!!...You can kill us, all of us, you can never ever stop us!! NEVER!!" The government accused Jawar Mohammed and his supporters of intercepting the body of Hachalu as it was being transported to his home town of Ambo, which lies 100 km west of Addis Ababa, against the wishes of Hachalu's family. Tiruneh Gemta, an official from Jawar's Oromo Federalist Congress party, told the BBC Afaan Oromoo service they were concerned about his arrest and that they hadn't visited "those who've been arrested due to the security situation". Jawar has led calls for more rights for the Oromo people, Ethiopia's largest ethnic group, who have been politically marginalised by previous governments. He previously supported reformist Prime Minister Abiy Ahmed, himself an Oromo, but has since become an ardent critic. 35 people, including Jawar, were apprehended, along with eight Kalashnikovs, five pistols, and nine radio transmitters, from his bodyguard.

After the murder of Hachalu ignited violence across Addis Ababa and other Ethiopian cities, Abiy hinted, without obvious suspects or clear motives for the killing, that Hachalu may have been murdered by outside forces set out to stir up trouble. An Egyptian diplomat responded by saying that Egypt "has nothing to do with current tensions in Ethiopia". Ian Bremmer wrote in a Time magazine article that Prime Minister Abiy "may just be looking for a scapegoat that can unite Ethiopians against a perceived common enemy".

== Legacy ==
In June 2021, the Hachalu Hundessa Foundation was established in the artist's name as a charity whose purpose is to promote young artists through financial and technical support. In 2022, it launched the Hachalu Hundessa Award, held each year on 29 June, the anniversary of Hachalu's death.

== Discography ==
=== Studio albums ===
- Sanyii Mootii (2009)
- Waa'ee Keenya (2013)
- Maal Mallisaa (2021)
