= 2014–2016 Oromo protests =

Civil uprising in Ethiopia

- Part of Oromo conflict
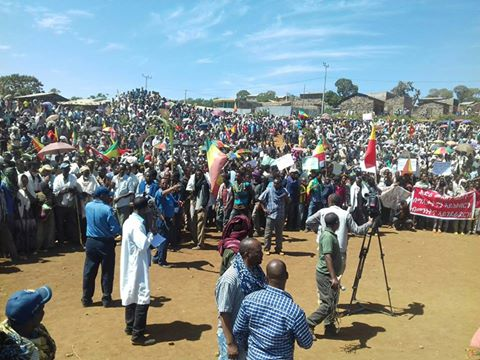
- Wolqayt demonstration in 2016
- Date: 25 April 2014 – December 2016
- Location: Oromia Region, Addis Ababa north-western, southern and eastern part of the regions Ambo, Dembi Dolo, and NekemteAmhara Region, Gondar and Bahir Dar
- Caused by: Oromo youth demonstrations started as a controversial 2014 Addis Ababa Master Plan to expand the capital into Oromia Special Zone Surrounding Finfinne destroys the territorial integrity of Oromia by dividing it into two regions; Amhara youth protesting in solidarity with the Oromo people and other Ethiopians against the authoritarian rule of the Tigray People's Liberation Front; Most extreme drought in 50 years followed by extreme flooding, both displacing parts of the population; While economic growth and industrialization takes place, the government disregards the rights and needs of the rural population, these are left behind; Human rights abuses (detention of opposition demonstrators) Oromia Region; Previous annexation of Wolqayt Tsegede in to the Tigray region.; Unfair distribution of wealth; Political marginalization; Land seizures by the Ethiopian government
- Goals: Policy improvement in the constitution surrounding human rights issue
- Methods: Protests; Demonstrations
- Status: A controversial Addis Ababa expansion plan sparked deadly violence in state of Oromia, which completely surrounding Addis Ababa was cancelled; Prime Minister Hailemariam Desalegn submitted his resignation as Prime Minister of Ethiopia and EPRDF chairperson on 15 February 2018 in response to Oromo protests succeeded by Abiy Ahmed Ali; Hundreds of killings and thousands of arrests in recent months by police; At least 90 shot and killed by police (as of 8 August)– 500 (claimed by Human Rights Watch); Thousands of protesters attacked and/or arrested by police; Suspected jailbreak attempt at Kaliti Prison resulting in at least 23 deaths; Irreechaa Festival massacre resulting from police confrontation results in the deaths of 55–300 people; Six-month state of emergency declared on 9 October 2016

Parties
(Oromia Region) Oromo pro-democratic protesters	Government of Ethiopia; Ethiopian National Defense Force; Ethiopian Federal Police

Lead figures
Jawar Mohammed	Prime Minister Hailemariam Desalegn

Casualties
- Deaths: 5,000+ (as of October 2016)
- Detained: 1,645

The 2014–2016 Oromo protests were a series of protests and resistance in Oromia which first sparked on 25 April 2014. The initial actions were taken in opposition to the Addis Ababa Master Plan, and resumed on 12 November 2015 by university students and farmers in the town of Ginchi, located 80 km southwest of Addis Ababa, encircled by Oromia. The plan was to expand the capital into the Oromia special zone, leading to fears that native Oromo farmers would lose their land and be displaced. The plan was later dropped but protests continued, highlighting issues such as marginalization and human rights. Mulatu Gemechu, deputy chairman of the opposition Oromo Federalist Congress, expressed to Reuters: "so far, we have compiled a list of 33 protesters killed by armed security forces that included police and soldiers but I am very sure the list will grow". Protesters demanded social and political reforms, including an end to human rights abuses like government killings of civilians, mass arrests, government land seizures, and political marginalization of opposition groups. The government responded by restricting access to the internet and attacking as well as arresting protesters.

In the three days leading up to 8 August 2016, Reuters reported that at least 90 protesters had been shot and killed by Ethiopian security forces, marking the most violent crackdown against protesters in sub-Saharan Africa since at least 75 people were killed during protests in Oromia Region in November and December 2015.

According to Human Rights Watch, at least 500 people are estimated to have been killed as of October 2016.

== Background and causes ==
=== Power struggle ===
In 1991, the Ethiopian People's Revolutionary Democratic Front (EPRDF) captured the capital Addis Ababa and ended the Ethiopian Civil War. The EPRDF was led by the Tigray People's Liberation Front and was dominated by those belonging to the Tigray ethnic group, which is a minority group comprising only about six percent of the country's population. However, members of this ethnic group have traditionally dominated senior positions in the country's military and political system, while those belonging to the Amhara and Oromo ethnic groups, who comprise a majority of the population, have felt rather marginalized over the past few decades.

Ethnic divisions are not as sharp in Ethiopia as might be indicated by statistics; intermarriage is extremely commonplace, and the actual disparity and disaffection between groups are not great. Furthermore, following the death of Meles Zenawi in 2012, the influence of the Tigray ethnic group became lower than in previous decades. Subsequent to his death neither of the two main political positions – President (head of state) and Prime Minister (head of government) – were occupied by a Tigrayan. Then-President Mulatu Teshome belonged to the Oromo ethnic group and then-Prime Minister Hailemariam Desalegn to the Wolayta ethnic group. Nevertheless, the perceived domination of the Tigray people had been in the back of the minds of some people and was a factor in the disturbances.

=== Addis Ababa Master Plan ===
Protests were first sparked on 25 April 2014 against expansion of boundaries Addis Ababa city and government responded by shooting at and beating peaceful protesters and on 12 November 2015, university students in the town of Ginchi, 80 km southwest of Addis Ababa, engaged in full blown strikes and street protests. Protests spread throughout 400 different locales across 17 zones of Oromia region according to Amnesty International 800 Oromo protesters killed since started

The 2016 Oromo youth demonstrations started because Addis Ababa's new city master plan proposed including farmlands from the surrounding Oromia region to cope with the city's rapid expansion. Amhara ethnic youth also followed the Oromos because of old bitterness towards the governing EPRDF (a party founded by the TPLF) who had instituted ethnic federalism which they claim promoted ethnic hatred, ethnic nationalism, and division in Ethiopia, while some have argued that Amhara protestors had ulterior motives of anger towards the TPLF because they had abolished what some claim to be a century-old Amhara dominance in Ethiopian governance. After deadly Oromo protests started since 25 April 2014, controversial master plan was cancelled on 12 January 2016 after 140 protesters were killed.

=== Drought and floods ===
In 2014, both rainy seasons in Ethiopia saw irregular rainfall. In 2015, due to an extremely strong El Niño event, both rainy seasons in Ethiopia almost did not happen at all. That resulted in an acute drought in particular in the Highlands of Ethiopia, crops and pastures dried up and herds were dying. It was considered to be the worst drought in 50 years. The drought did hit particularly hard in Amhara Region and Oromia Region. After 18 months of severe drought with almost nothing left over to eat for drought-affected people, very strong torrential rains that started in April 2016 did worsen the situation until October 2016. The flooding displaced people for months in exactly the same regions, that were most affected by the long drought. Ethiopia is a multi-ethnic state. UNICEF experience in Ethiopia has shown such droughts and floods often result in humanitarian shocks and tensions between ethnic groups.

=== Rural discontent ===
The country has been experiencing rapid economic growth since the 2000s and is one of the world's fastest-growing economies and is Africa's second-most populous country. But while economic development and growth and industrialization are supported a lot by the authoritarian government, often the needs of the rural population remain unconsidered, the freedom and civil rights of farmers and pastoralists in particular are often neglected. They are left behind.

== Protests ==
The November and December 2015 protests in the Oromia Region that resulted in the killings of over 100 people by government forces. The 2015 protests were later followed by a police crackdown and the arrests of hundreds of opposition members.

According to diplomatic, NGO, and opposition sources, hundreds of thousands of people marched in more than 200 towns and cities in the vast Oromia State, in protest at "the government's draconian and ever-escalating repression". This resulted in at least 148 people being killed on 5 and 6 August.

On 2 October 2016, more protests occurred where an estimated two million people were attending the annual Irreechaa festival in Bishoftu in the Oromia region. The festival is attended by Oromos from all walks of life to celebrate life and nature. An anti-government protest disrupted the event, with some claiming they involved peacefully chanting slogans against the Oromo Peoples' Democratic Organization, while others claim stones and bottles were thrown. People died in a stampede as a result of police using tear gas, rubber bullets and baton charges, falling into a deep ditch and being crushed, or drowning in a lake. While the Oromia regional government confirmed the deaths of 52 people, rights groups, the opposition leader, and local reports claim various numbers up to nearly 300 people dead. On August 6, hundreds of protesters marched on Meskel Square in Addis Ababa and shouted "we want our freedom" and "free our political prisoners". Dozens of protesters were arrested by Addis Ababa's police.

=== Kaliti Prison ===
23 imprisoned Oromo protesters died in Kaliti Prison after a fire broke out, wherein 21 died from carbon monoxide poisoning and 2 were killed by security force after an attempt to escape.

=== Protest spread to Amhara ===
Protests in the Oromia region spread to Amhara Region in the summer of 2016. In July 2016, the Anti-terrorism task force detained members of the Wolqayt Amhara Identity Committee (WAIC), a legally registered organisation. Soon after, protests erupted in many areas of the Amhara Region, the historic ethnic center of the Ethiopian state and home to the spectacular monolithic rock-cut churches of Lalibela and medieval castles of Gondar that attract tourists from all over. One of the biggest demonstrations took place was on August 1, 2016, in Gondar city. Hundreds of thousands of people held a peaceful demonstration over the arrest of the WAIC members, government repression and protest Federal government encroachment in regional affairs. Protesters carried placards expressing solidarity with the Oromo people. As they marched, they were heard to be chanting in Amharic "በኦሮምያ የሚፈሰዉ ደም ደማችን ነዉ" which translates to “the pouring of blood in Oromia is our blood” and “the killings of our brothers in Oromia needs to stop”. They also drew attention to the dispute over the administration of Wolqayt Tsegede. A region that is currently part of the Tigray state despite its citizens identifying as ethnic Amhara.

Further demonstrations soon followed in the Amhara Region. Many protests spiraled into violence as security forces fired live bullets on protesters. On 5 August 2016, 50 student protesters were killed while protesting in the populous city of Bahir Dar, the capital of the Amhara Region and a major tourist destination. Evidence collected by Ethiopian Human Rights Project has so far shown that major protests took place in 6 of the 11 zones in the Amhara Region. The zones included North Gondar, South Gondar, Bahir Dar Special, Agew Awi, East Gojam and West Gojam zones. Anti-government street demonstrations and "stay at home" protests took place in small wereda towns and in some cases in rural kebeles across the six zones. The protests that were ignited in the historic town of Gondar, quickly spread to Debarq, Debre Tabor, Metema, Ambagiorgis, Wereta, Simada, Gayint, Bahir Dar, Finote Selam, Burre, Enjibara, Dangila, Chagni, Tilili, Birsheleqo, Quarit, Dembecha, Amanuel, Debre Markos and other towns.

After the growing discontent in Amhara Region and Oromia Region the Israeli Foreign Ministry issued a travel warning on 1 September 2016. The Amhara Region included in the warning includes the city of Gondar, a popular site for many Israeli tourists and an area where many Ethiopian Jews originated. The warning was announced a day after the Prime Minister of Ethiopia Hailemariam Desalegn's announcement on the state owned media EBC and gave direct order for the Ethiopia Army forces to use any force necessary to bring order to the region. The protesters continued and several flower farms were burned down in Amhara Region and clashes between security forces and local protesters continued.

The Ethiopian Government declared a state of emergency on 8 October 2016. On 16 October 2016, the government announced, restrictions and prohibitions on Internet usage, postings on Facebook, crossing the wrists above the head, diplomatic travel, fire arms and the viewing of media that the government deems to be “terrorist media”. There were also curfews in both regions from 18:00 to 06:00 to prevent further violence. The government crackdown was tough. Maina Kiai, a U.N. rights rapporteur, said "The scale of this violence and the shocking number of deaths make it clear that this is a calculated campaign to eliminate opposition movements and silence dissenting voices”. The Human Rights Watch estimated that at least 400 people were killed in protests over the next several months.

As a continuation of the Amhara protest, two years later several protests were held in Northern Wollo province. In January 2018, Ethiopian security forces killed seven people and wounded several others in the town of Woldia, 500 km north of Addis Ababa along the main road to Mekele. Nigussu Tilahun, the head of the Amhara region's communications bureau at the time, confirmed that deaths had occurred but did not say how many. A huge crowd of people were parading through the streets of the town for the annual Timket festival, an Ethiopian Orthodox Christian celebration of Epiphany when a group of young men protested because the federal police forces prohibited them from making round dancing and chanting. A witness said police had fired into the crowd and the crowd began running in all directions.

The United Nations High Commission for Human Rights (UNHRC) condemned the incident in Woldia, stating that the incident “reportedly took place when the security forces tried to stop people from chanting anti-government songs and allegedly opened fire on them", and that "protesters reportedly later blocked roads and destroyed a number of properties.” This comes just two weeks after Ethiopia's ruling coalition, the Ethiopian People's Revolutionary Democratic Front, officially announced its intention to undertake reforms following protests that began in 2016.

Seven people have also been killed in the northern town of Kobo after security forces fired on a crowd who were reportedly protesting the killings in Woldia. A ten-year-old boy and two members of the defence forces were among those killed. Many more were injured in the incident. Protesters gathered around the town's police station to condemn the security forces' brutality at a religious ceremony in Woldia their not being held accountable in a court of law. Later on, thousands demonstrated, opposing the killings of innocent people at Timket festival in Woldia and calling for an end to police beatings, with protests reported in Habru districts of Mersa, Robit, Gobiye, all of the towns crossed by the main all-weather road from Addis Ababa to Mekele. In Mersa, around 10 people were shot dead.

== Reactions ==
=== Domestic ===
The Ethiopian government denied violence was being committed by the country's security forces, naming regional rivals Eritrea and Egypt as fomenting the ongoing unrest.

=== International ===
The United States Embassy in Addis Ababa released a statement of concern.

Legislation was authored by US Congressman Chris Smith, to protect civilians in Ethiopia as well as promote democracy and good governance. The legislation also "calls on the Secretary of State to improve the oversight and accountability of U.S. assistance in Ethiopia". Rep. Smith was joined by U.S. Representative Mike Coffman as well as victims of torture at the hands of the Ethiopian Government Seenaa Jimjimo, Tewondrose Tirfe and Guya Abaguya Deki, during a press conference to announce this legislation.

In May 2017, Prince Zeid bin Ra'ad, the High Commissioner for Human Rights, said he would open an investigation into the human rights abuses perpetrated during the protests.

== See also ==
- 2014 Addis Ababa Master Plan
- Human rights in Ethiopia
- List of protests in the 21st century
