= Jawar Mohammed =

Ethiopian political analyst and activist

Jawar Mohammad
- Jawaar Mohammad
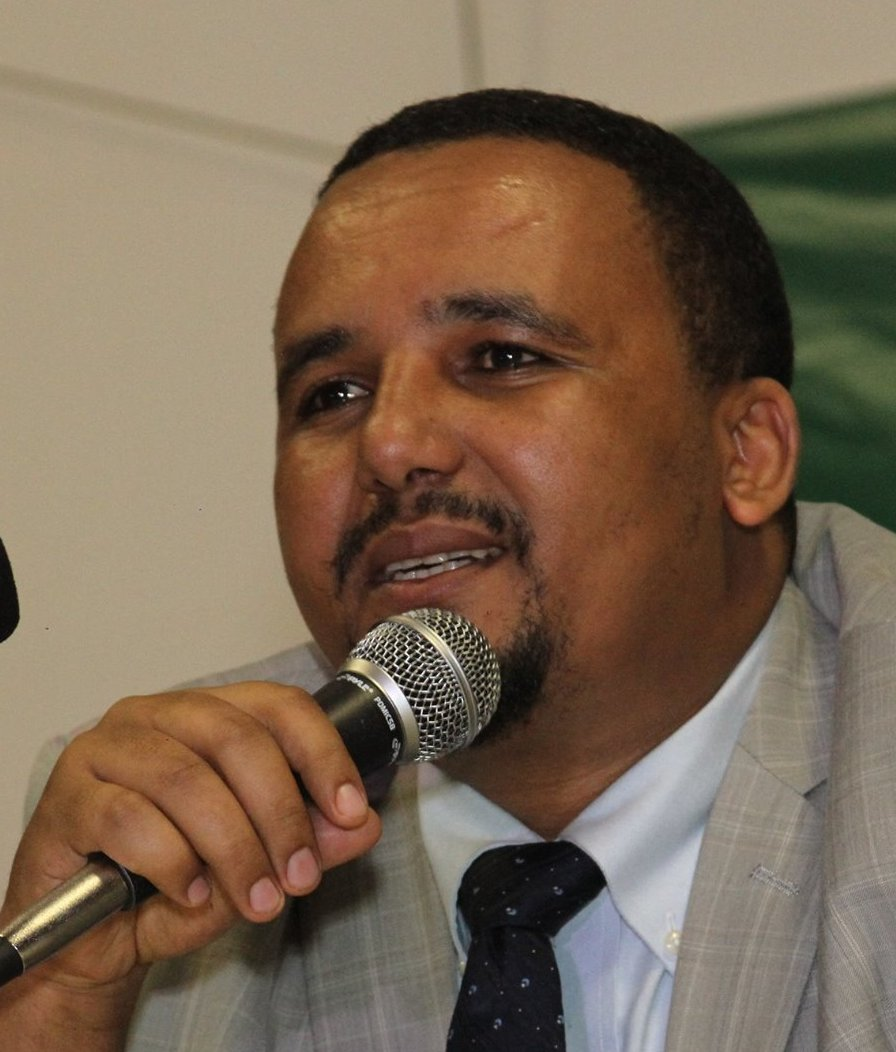
- Jawar in 2017
- Born: Jawar Siraj Mohammed; 12 May 1986 (age 40); Dhumuga, Arsi, Ethiopia
- Education: Stanford University (B.A.); Columbia University (M.A.)
- Occupation: Political activist
- Known for: Leader of Oromo protests
- Notable work: Founder of OMN
- Television: OMN
- Title: CEO
- Predecessor: Established
- Successor: Girma Gutema
- Political party: Oromo Federalist Congress
- Movement: Qeerroo
- Spouse: Ilili Jemal Abdulahi (m. 2023)
- Children: 1

Jawar Mohammed (Oromo: Jawaar Mahammad; ግእዝ፡ ጃዋር መሐመድ born 12 May 1986) is an Ethiopian political analyst and activist. One of the founders of the Oromia Media Network (OMN), Jawar was a leading organizer of the 2014–2016 Oromo protests. He has been credited with toppling the incumbent government in February 2018 and helping bring Abiy Ahmed to power. After 2019, he emerged as one of the leading opponents to the government of Abiy Ahmed in Ethiopia, who accused him of terrorist activities.

== Early life and education ==
Jawar Mohammed was born on 12 May 1986 in the Dhumuga, Arsi Province bordering Hararghe. His father was Arsi Oromo, of Muslim faith, while his mother an Orthodox Christian; the inter-religious union was novel but gained acceptance within the community. Jawar describes his father as non practicing Muslim and Communist while his paternal grandfather was officially Muslim but seemed atheist. In contrast to his Christian grandparents who he describes very religious Orthodox Christians. He regularly attends Church with his Lutheran wife.

Jawar began his formal education at a Catholic school in Asella. He attended secondary school in Adama until 2003, when he was awarded a scholarship to study at the United World College of South East Asia in Singapore, from which he graduated in 2005. He described his experience at the UWC as awakening his consciousness to his own Oromo identity. He graduated from Stanford University in 2009 with a degree in political science, and acquired a Master's in human rights from Columbia University, in 2012.

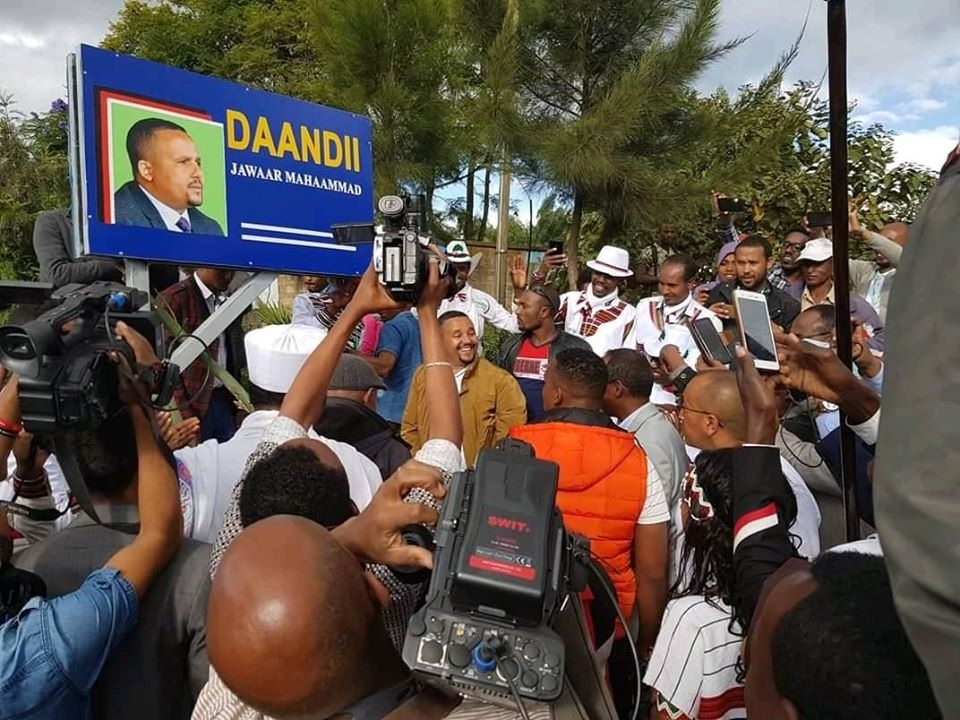
A street was named after Jawar Mohammed in Asella in which he ceremoniously received by his fans.

== Career ==
=== Legal issues ===
On 30 June 2020, Jawar along with Bekele Gerba, Eskinder Nega and Sintayew Chekol were arrested by government amidst a riot sparked after singer Hachalu Hundessa murder. They were charged with terrorism in context of "inciting violence" at the crackdown. On 5 February 2021, the Ethiopian Human Rights Commission (EHRC) Chief Commissioner Daniel Bekele said that "very close supervision is required to prevent any grave threat to their health and life and that reasonably justified demands of the prisoners must be addressed" following reports indicating their health condition deterioration and undergoing hunger strike at prison.

On 7 January 2022, the Ethiopian government announced it would release several political prisoners including Jawar, stating it was "to pave the way for a lasting solution to Ethiopia’s problems in a peaceful, non-violent way" through a “national dialogue”.

=== 2024 memoir ===
Jawar published a 500-page memoir titled I Will Not Regret (Amharic: አልፀፀትም, Oromo: Hin Gaabbu on 19 December 2024 and unveiled in Nairobi, Kenya. The book is centered around his life and persecutions under the Ethiopian government, especially during the Hachalu Hundessa riots. He explained "At first, it was difficult to even obtain paper. Later, with the help of prison guards and others, I managed to smuggle the pages out one by one".
