= Qeerroo =

Oromo-led social movement in Ethiopia

- Other name: Oromo National Youth Movement for Freedom and Democracy (ONYMFD)
- Leader: Jawar Mohammed
- Founded: April 2011
- Country: Ethiopia; United States; Australia
- Allegiance: Political allies: Oromo Liberation Front; Oromo Federalist Congress
- Ideology: Oromo nationalism
- Status: Active
- Website: qeerroo.org

Oromo National Youth Movement for Freedom and Democracy (ONYMFD), popularly known as Qeerroo, is a social movement organized with ideology of Oromo nationalism in Ethiopia. In traditional Oromo culture the term means "bachelor" or youth but within the political movement that shares the same name, it symbolizes the Oromo struggle for increased political freedom, greater ethnic representation in government, "... an entire generation of newly assertive Ethiopian youth,".

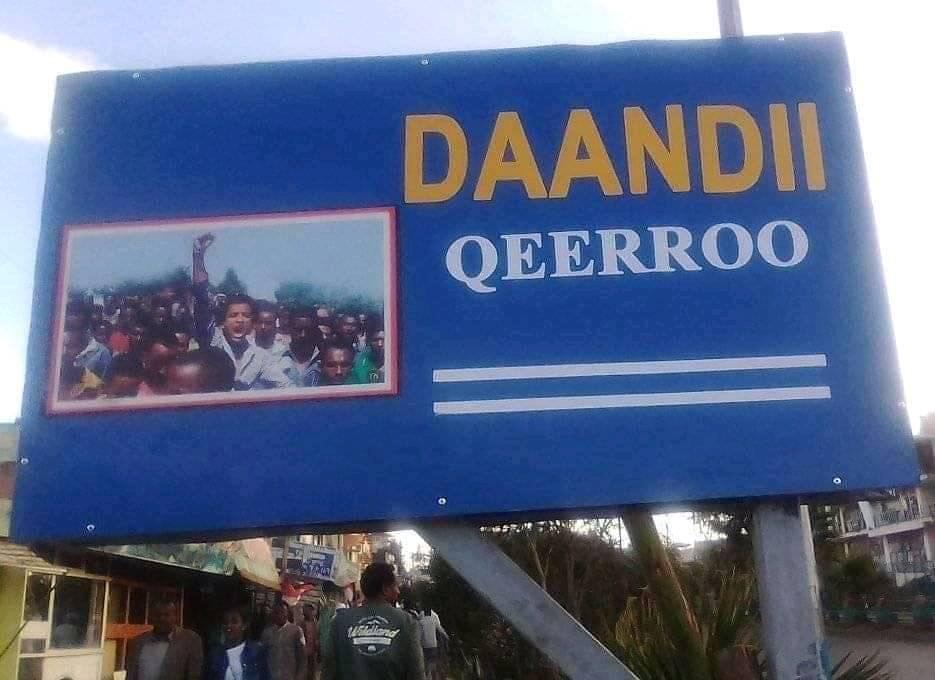
Qeerroo street named to remember its struggle in Asella. The government renamed the street while celebrating the 2019 Irreecha festival in Arsi

The BBC has described Qeerroo as being Ethiopia's National Youth Movement for Freedom and Democracy, which calls itself Qeerroo Bilisummaa Oromoo.

== Background and emergence ==
The Qeerroo movement emerged in the early 2010s against a backdrop of land rights disputes and political marginalization reported by Oromo activists. Analysts link the growth of Qeerroo to student protests in Oromia beginning in April 2014 over the Addis Ababa Integrated Master Plan. The protests expanded to wider grievances regarding political representation, language rights, and detentions of opposition

== History ==
The Qeerroo, also known as the Qubee generation, "first emerged in 1991 with the participation of the Oromo Liberation Front (OLF) in the transitional government of Ethiopia." Qeerroos also played a key role in the 2014–2016 Oromo protests. Jawar Mohammed, a qeerroo, played a key role in founding the ONYMFD.

The Qeerroo movement inspired many marginalized ethnic to create youth movements, such as Ejjetto, Barbaarta and Zarma. The Somali Barbaarta's demand to end Abdi Illey's presidency of the Somali Region and the Sidama Ejjatto's demand of statehood for the Sidama Region succeeded. They staged nationwide protest rallies in July 2020 following the assassination of Oromo musician Hachalu Hundessa.
