= Hachalu Hundessa riots =

2020 civil unrest in Oromia Region, Ethiopia

- Part of the Oromo conflict and Ethiopian civil conflict (2018–present)
- The Oromia Region in Ethiopia
- Date: 30 June – 2 July 2020 (2 days)
- Location: Ethiopia (Oromia Region mainly, Addis Ababa, Shashemene, and Ambo)
- Caused by: Assassination of prominent Oromo singer, Hachalu Hundessa
- Methods: Civil disorder; Pogrom; Vandalism
- Result: Military forces deployed throughout Addis Ababa and its vicinity to contain violence; Eskinder Nega and Sintayehu Chekol from the Balderas movement, a critic of both the Abiy Ahmed's government and Oromo nationalists, were also arrested for "attempting to incite violence"; Several members of OLF and Oromo Federalist Democratic Movement were arrested following Hachalu's death; Addis Ababa based two senior members of the TPLF were arrested by Federal police; Jawar Mohammed and Bekele Gerba were arrested by Ethiopian National Defense Force for intercepting transport of body of Hachalu Hundessa to Ambo

Parties
Ethiopian & Oromos Protester	(Ethiopia) Ethiopian Government; Ethiopian National Defense Force; Federal Police

Casualties
- Deaths: 239+

The Hachalu Hundessa riots were a series of civil unrest that occurred in the Oromia Region of Ethiopia, more specifically in the hot spot of Addis Ababa, Shashamene and Ambo following the killing of the Oromo musician Hachalu Hundessa on 29 June 2020. The riots lead to the deaths of at least 239 people according to initial police reports. Peaceful protests against Hachalu's killing have been held by Oromos abroad as well. The Ethiopian Human Rights Commission (EHRC) found in its 1 January 2021 full report that part of the killings were a crime against humanity, with deliberate, widespread systematic killing of civilians by organised groups. The EHRC counted 123 deaths, 76 of which it attributed to security forces.

== Background ==
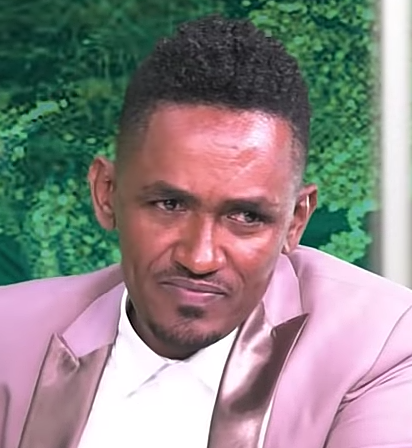
Hachalu Hundessa in LTV Show interview (November 2018)

Hachalu Hundessa was a popular singer whose politically tinged songs were popular during the 2015 and 2016 Ethiopian protests and made him "a political symbol of the Oromo people's aspirations and catapulted Abiy Ahmed to power." He was shot on the evening of 29 June 2020 in the Gelan Condominiums area in Addis Ababa. He was taken to Tirunesh Beijing General Hospital, a government hospital in Addis Ababa, Ethiopia, where he died from his injuries. Thousands of his fans headed to the hospital in the city where his body was taken on Monday night. In Addis Ababa, police used tear gas to disperse the crowd outside the hospital, and gunshots were heard in the city where people set fire to tires. Hachalu's body was taken to his hometown, Ambo, about 100 km west of the capital, but protesters tried to stop this and insisted that he should be buried in Addis Ababa. Police are investigating his death.

The singer had said that he had received death threats, but it is not clear who was behind his shooting. Hachalu's songs often focused on the rights of the country's Oromo ethnic group and became anthems in a wave of protests that led to the downfall of the previous prime minister in 2018.

== Aftermath ==
Following Hachalu Hundessa's death, protesters took to the streets in the Oromia region and the capital Addis Ababa to express their grievance and to demand justice.

On 30 June, groups of youths roamed through neighborhoods in Addis Ababa, and public buildings and private businesses were destroyed and businesses looted. That same day, three explosions occurred in Addis Ababa, killing both some of the perpetrators and bystanders. Seven civilians and three police officers were killed, "either beaten with rocks, or shot, or [in] a series of bombings." At demonstrations in Adama, nine protesters were killed and another 75 were injured.

In Ambo, Hachalu's hometown, three policemen and 78 civilians were killed in the "mayhem" surrounding his funeral, including one of Hachalu's uncles. At least nine of the civilians were killed by security forces.

In Shashamane, violence was particularly widespread, with "up to 150" people killed, according to the regional deputy police commissioner, Girma Gelan. Eye-witness reports claimed that "all but 4 or 5 buildings" in the town center had been torched, and that the Rastafari community had been targeted due to its association with the Emperor Haile Selassie. Witnesses who spoke with Voice of America described how shopping centres, restaurants, residences, and hotels owned by "outsiders" were attacked, including one owned by celebrated runner Haile Gebrselassie. (Note: Gebrselassie is however an ethnic Oromo.) Victims described the violence as targeted; according to Yohannes Wolde, the headmaster of a large private school, the Dinkinesh Education Center, rioters burned down three separate campuses of the school in different parts of the town, as well as his private residence, which was the only house in the area to be attacked. Temam Hussein, mayor of Shashamane, said that while protests had initially been peaceful, "Some [people] had an agenda to divert it into ethnic conflict and looting." During the Shashamane massacre, mostly Amharas, Gurages, Jamaicans (especially Rastafarians), and other civilians were attacked.

Two people were shot to death in Chiro, while protesters in Harar toppled a statue of Ras Makonnen Wolde Mikael. In Adama, demonstrators set fire to the mayor's office and tried to take over the headquarters of the regional state broadcaster. Violence was also severe in Bale Robe, Ziway, and Negele Arsi.

In Ziway, Amharic speakers were labelled as "neftenya" (Amharic: ነፍጠኛ, and were targeted for assaults, according to multiple witnesses.

=== Response ===
At 9 a.m., 30 June 2020, the internet was cut across much of Ethiopia, a measure found by telecoms watchdog NetBlocks to be consistent with previous national internet shutdowns imposed by the government during unrest. Prime Minister Abiy Ahmed expressed his condolences to Hundessa's family, saying that Hachalu's assassins intended not to kill him alone but "through him to kill Ethiopia," and he also urged calm amid growing unrest. Media owner and activist Jawar Mohammed responded to Hundessa's death on Facebook, saying "They did not just kill Hachalu. They shot at the heart of the Oromo Nation, once again!!...You can kill us, all of us, you can never ever stop us!! NEVER!!" Ethiopians on social media, including the country's ambassador to Washington, expressed their shock at the killing of the popular musician. On Oromia Media Network (OMN), a caller said “Oromo should be organized, do not sit home do nothing and anyone against Oromo should take measure”. Members of Amhara ethnic groups accused media outlets of actively instigating the attacks live and instructing the attackers and broadcast a series of inflammatory hate-filled messages, including calls to lock and burn the homes of Amhara people with no supporting evidence.

On 30 June 2020, Jawar Mohammed and Bekele Gerba were arrested by Ethiopian Federal police after an incident between Jawar's guards and police that resulted in the death of a police officer. The incident happened when Jawar and his guards intercepted the transportation of the remains of Hachalu Hundessa to his home town of Ambo, which lies 100 km west of Addis Ababa. Jawar wanted to have the funeral in Addis Ababa, while Hachalu's parents and wife wanted to have the burial in Ambo. The government claimed that the intention was to have Hundessa's funeral in Addis Ababa so that angry Oromo youths that would come to the city would destroy statues and monuments in the city, a move that would have put them on a collision course with the city residents. The plan was allegedly to use the ensuing violence in discrediting and overthrowing the government of Abiy Ahmed. Thirty-five people, including Jawar, were apprehended, along with eight Kalashnikovs, five pistols, and nine radio transmitters from his bodyguards. Subsequently, former journalist-turned-politician Eskinder Nega and Sintayehu Chekol from the Balderas movement, a critic of both the government and Oromo ethno-nationalists, were also arrested for "attempting to incite violence."

By 5 July, police had arrested at least four people in direct connection with Hachalu's death. Abiy reportedly suggested that Egypt may be behind the unrest, saying "those external and internal forces who were not successful with the Grand Ethiopian Renaissance Dam issue have tried their utmost efforts to create chaos at this time". An Egyptian diplomat responded by saying that Egypt "has nothing to do with current tensions in Ethiopia." Ian Bremmer wrote in a Time magazine article that Prime Minister Abiy "may just be looking for a scapegoat that can unite Ethiopians against a perceived common enemy."

While some have welcomed the government's move as a "firm response" to restore order and provide accountability, others have warned that a crackdown, in light of delayed elections, would "exacerbate underlying tensions, and put [Ethiopia's] nascent democracy into danger."

=== Demonstrations outside Ethiopia ===
Oromos held protests in Minneapolis–Saint Paul, Chicago, Paris, and London, among other locations, demanding justice for Hachalu Hundessa and the release of political prisoners Jawar Mohammed, Bekele Gerba, and dozens of Oromia Media Network journalists. On 30 June 2020, a statue of Emperor Haile Selassie in Cannizaro Park, Wimbledon, South West London, was destroyed by Oromo protesters. The offices of the state-run Oromia Broadcasting Network in St. Anthony, Minnesota were ransacked by protesters, forcing the station to suspend operations. Another group of demonstrators blocked traffic in Aurora, Colorado in reaction to the death Hundessa.

Some Oromo activists and ethnic nationalists have drawn parallels between the Hachalu Hundessa riots in Ethiopia with the George Floyd protests in the United States, although critics argued such claims were flawed and served as an alibi for ethnically motivated violence, especially as a justification for pogrom massacres in Ethiopia, including the Shashamane massacre.

== Investigations and court cases ==
The Ethiopian Human Rights Commission published its full report on 1 January 2021, finding the killings during the unrest to have constituted a crime against humanity.

The EHRC report counted 123 people killed during 30 June to 2 July 2020 in the 40 locations investigated, and 500 injured. Among the 123 lethal victims, 76 deaths were caused by security forces, 35 by individuals and groups participating in the events, and 12 died from violent events such as bombs or fire.

The EHRC found that the deliberate attacks against civilians constituted a crime against humanity, arguing that the necessary legal elements were present:

- a large number of organised people moved around with the intention of killing, injuring and displacing people and destroying property;
- the actions were widespread and systematic attacks against civilians;
- some of the targets were selected based on ethnic and religious identity;
- the perpetrators were aware of the actions as part of a systematic attack against civilians;
- online social media and television content and slogans chanted by perpetrators showed deliberate intent by the perpetrators.

The EHRC reported successful limitation of the attacks by security forces in some areas, and failures by the security forces to respond to victims' repeated calls for help in other places. Some medical staff refused to treat survivors of the attacks. Some of the use of lethal force by security forces was "highly questionable," leading to the deaths of passersby and mediators. The EHRC stated that it was unaware of investigations and judicial procedures in relation to the security forces' actions.

In its report, the EHRC called on regional and federal authorities to carry out investigations and judicial procedures and to develop institutions for long-term solutions for discrimination and attacks on minorities.

== See also ==
- Gawa Qanqa massacre
- Gimbi massacre
- Qelem Wollega massacre
