= Ambo, Ethiopia =

Town in Oromia Region, Ethiopia

Ambo አምቦ
- Town
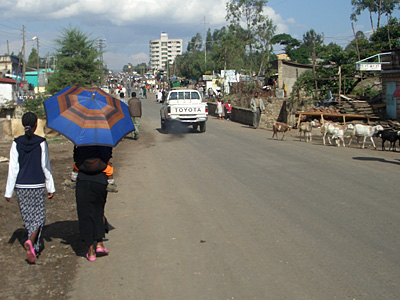
- Downtown Ambo (March 2006)

- Location within Ethiopia
- Coordinates: 8°59′N 37°51′E
- Country: Ethiopia
- Region: Oromia
- Zone: West Shewa
- Elevation: 2,101 m (6,893 ft)

Population (2012)
  - Total: 94,342
- Time zone: UTC+3 (EAT)
- Area code: 11
- Climate: Cwb

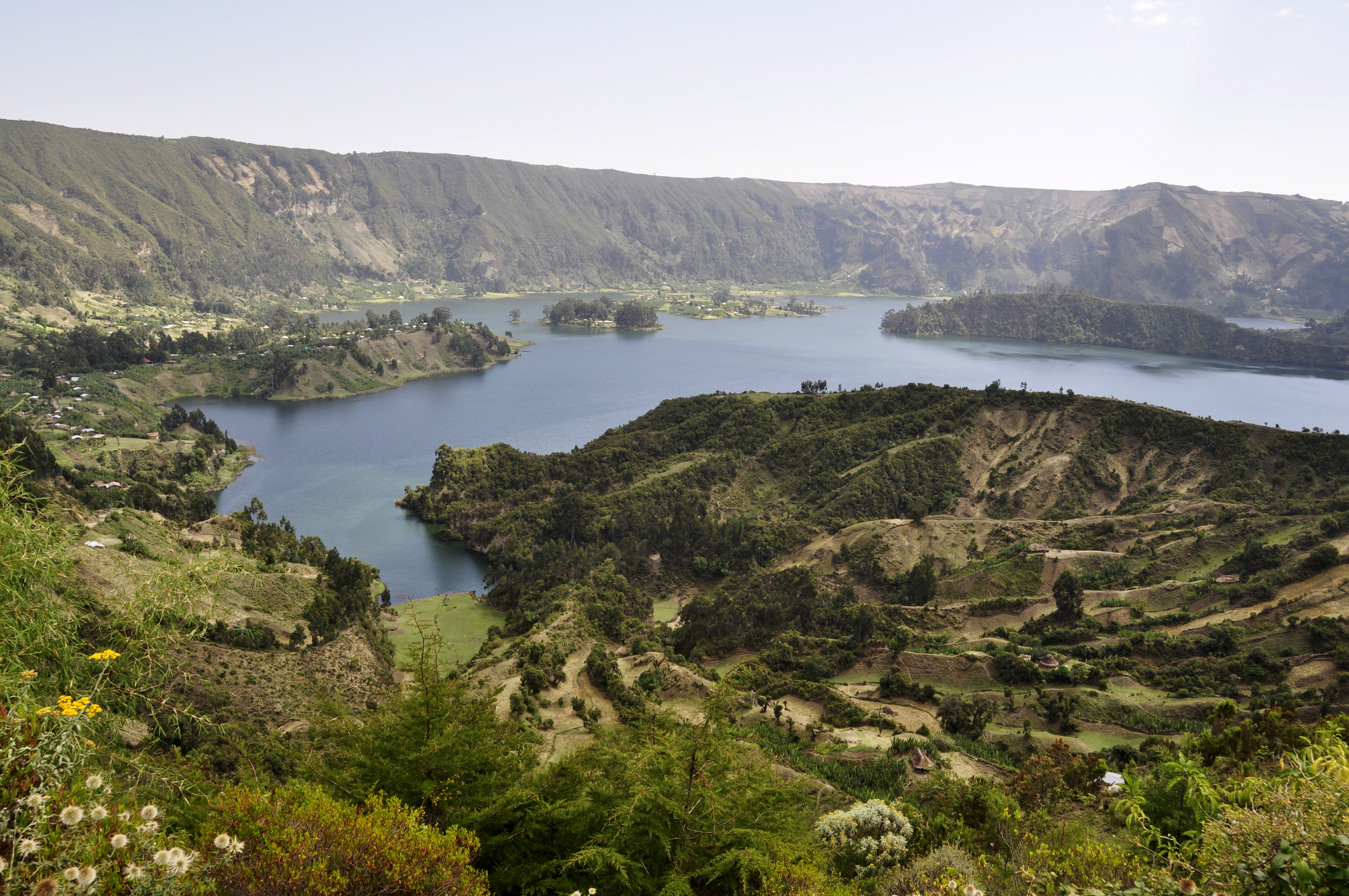
Wenchi crater lake

Ambo (Oromo: Amboo, Amharic: አምቦ) is a town in west-central Ethiopia. Located in the West Shewa Zone of Oromia Region, west of Addis Ababa, it is the capital city of West Shewa zone. This town has a latitude and longitude of 8°59′N 37°51′E and an elevation of 2,101 meters.

Ambo is known for its mineral water, which is bottled outside of town; it is reportedly the most popular brand in Ethiopia. Nearby attractions include Mount Wenchi to the south with its crater lake, and the Guder, Teltele and Huluka Falls. Ambo is also the location of a research station of the Ethiopian Institute of Agricultural Research; initiated in 1977, this station hosts research in protecting major crops in Ethiopia. The town's market day is Tuesday, thursday and Saturday.

== History ==
After Lij Iyasu was captured, he was held for a while at Ambo, before being transferred to house arrest at Fiche. In the early 1930s, Mahtama Selassie Walda Mesqal, who had studied agriculture in France and Spain, started an agricultural station near the town. By 1933, Ambo had started to be a recreation place with the construction of some bath cabins with cisterns of concrete, and a couple of European-type hotels, as well as simple villas for the Emperor and important persons.

By 1938, the Guida dell'A.O.I. described improvements to Ambo which included a post office, telephone service, a clinic for outpatients, restaurants, and a projected hotel. Two Italian forts were constructed, and in a cave the Italians had erected a monument for casualties of the Pusteria Division. The approach to Ambo was still over an old bridge, and below it a natural bridge used by caravans.

When the Allies reached Ambo with a South African armored car patrol in early 1941, they had to evacuate 140 "utterly panicked Italians". The British operated an improvised camp for prisoners-of-war at Ambo until 1942.

At least as early as 1955, there was a 170 kW hydro-electric power station in the town; by 1965 the installed electrical capacity was 210 kVA, with annual production of 132,000 kWh. In 1958 Ambo was one of 27 places in Ethiopia ranked as First Class Township. That same year, the Ambo Agricultural School and Ambo Forestry School had 150 students. A light earth tremor was felt in the evening of 23 January 1968; its epicenter was somewhere near Ambo but no damage occurred.

In the last weeks of the Ethiopian Civil War, military units of the Ethiopian People's Revolutionary Democratic Front captured Ambo on 25 April 1991 from the disintegrating units of the Derg. This was part of their strategy to avoid a direct assault on the capital, Addis Ababa, and instead surround the city and isolate it from the rest of the country.

A prominent Oromo businessman, Daraaraa Kafani, was murdered in front of his home; eyewitnesses said he was slain by a man wearing a military uniform. His funeral was attended by thousands of Oromos in Ambo; police arrested more than 37 people, stating that they were supporters of the Oromo Liberation Front on 3 September. In the following February, 70 year old Oromo elder Dandana Gurmu was arrested on the accusation that he was a supporter of the OLF.

On 24 April 2003, a Tigrayan student was shot and killed and two others injured in a clash between Oromo and Tigrayan students at the Ambo Agricultural College. The killing was believed to be retaliation for the severe beating of an Oromo student in Mek'ele in December 2002. By the year's end, five persons were in police custody awaiting trial.

== Demographics ==
The 2007 national census reported a total population for Ambo of 48,171, of whom 24,634 were men and 23,537 were women. The majority of the inhabitants said they observed Ethiopian Orthodox Christianity, with 65.18% of the population reporting they observed this belief, while 27.45% of the population were Protestant.

The 1994 census reported this town had a total population of 27,636 of whom 13,380 were males and 14,256 were females.

== Education ==
Ambo Comprehensive Senior Secondary School, with its large library and modern laboratory has been one of the best high schools in the country. The school celebrated its 50th anniversary (Golden Jubilee) in 2006. Prominent alumni include poet Tsegaye Gebre-Medhin and former Ethiopian Prime minister Tesfaye Dinka. Ambo students' movement played notable role in the Ethiopian student movement, particularly during the final years of the feudal regime and the recurring student unrest of the current administration.

Ambo High School absorbs students from surrounding woredas which extends as far as East Wollega Zone. The concentration of young students in the town has been significant contributor for the city's high political consciousness.

=== University ===
The city is the home of Ambo University.

== Sister city ==
On 18 December 2006, the Oromia Region government signed an agreement with Henan in China to establish a sister city program with Xuchang. Guder and gedo, ginchi

== See also ==
- Ambo Mineral Water

== Bibliography ==
- VV.AA. (1938). Guida dell'Africa Orientale Italiana (in Italian). Milano: CTI.
