= Television in Ethiopia =

Television in Ethiopia was introduced in 1962 with the government-owned ETV. Color television started in 1979 on an experiment basis with regular transmissions starting in 1984 to commemorate the founding of Workers' Party of Ethiopia (WPE). Ethiopia got its first private television broadcaster in 2008 with EBS TV, a US-based satellite TV channel mostly focused on infotainment.

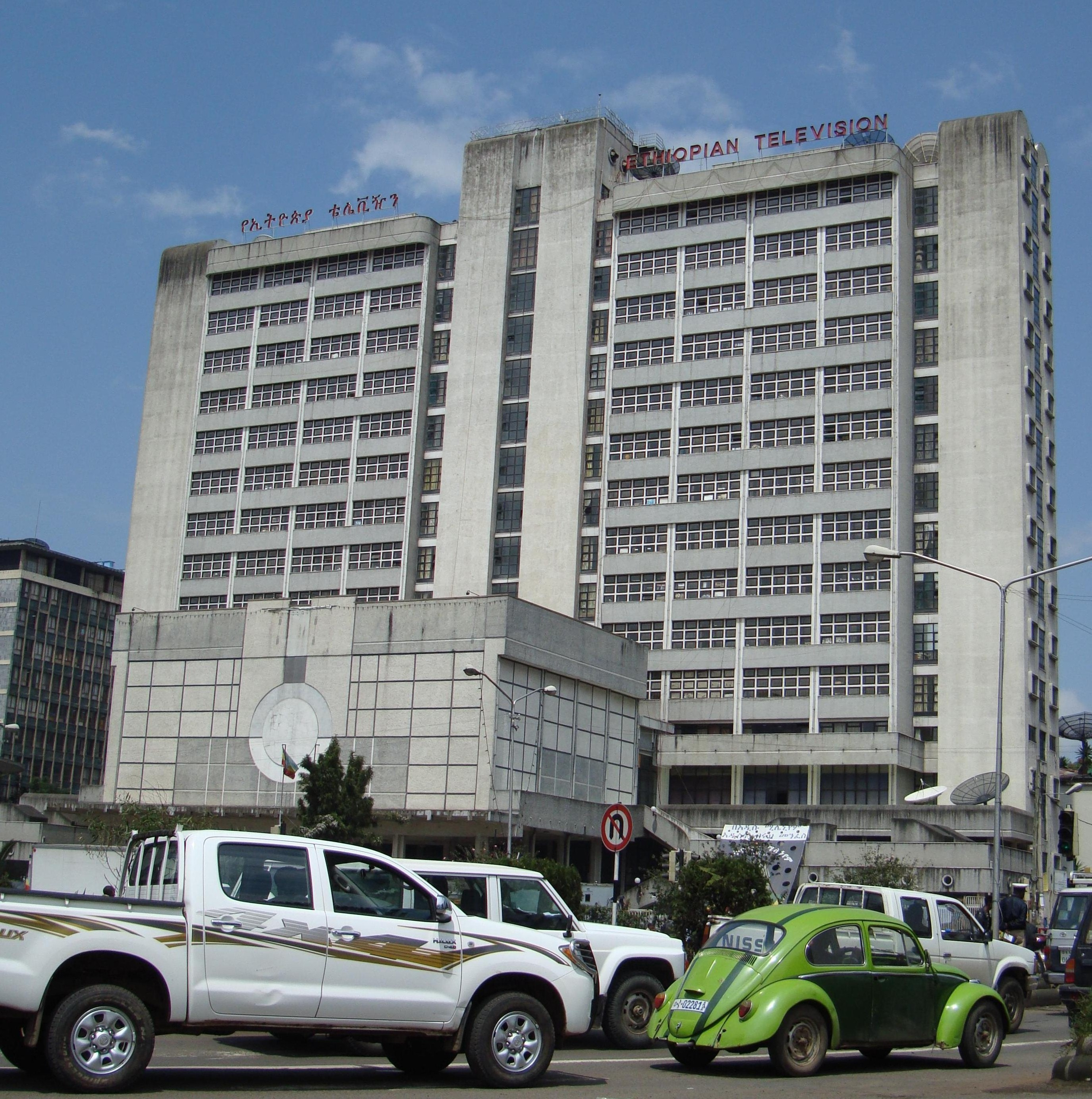
The Ethiopian Broadcasting Corporation headquarter in 2008

Until very recently there was only one private station, with most of the stations being state-owned. However, emphasis on liberalization of the TV market eventually led to a wave of privately owned stations coming about recent years. In 2014 the Oromo diaspora launched the one and only television; Oromia Media Network, based in US OMN. In 2016 and 2017, more private broadcasters such as the news-centered ENN TV and others like LTV Ethiopia, Kana TV, Qubee TV, and EOTC TV all joined the market, and were launched at the end of 2018. 7 million households in Ethiopia have at least one television set, and about 55 percent of the population has access to watch television in their homes.

== History ==
The national public broadcaster EBC (formerly ERTA) started broadcasting in 1962 as the first television station in Ethiopia. In the last couple of the decades the broadcaster had opened multiple regional stations and channels broadcasting in various languages. Privatization of the television industry was a slow process with the first privately run broadcaster, EBS TV, launching in 2008. However, 2016 and 2017 saw a wave of private station entering the market including what became the most popular channel, Kana TV, to increase the total number of private station's in Ethiopia to 45.

In 2016 the government of Ethiopia announced it would transition the country from analog to digital platform. The American company GatesAir won the contract for the project, that will take 5–10 years to fully complete.

== TV stations ==
=== Government-owned television stations ===
#	Stations	Category	Language
1	Ethiopian Broadcasting Corporation (EBC)	General, news	Amharic
2	Oromia Broadcasting Network	General, news	Oromo
3	Amhara Media Corporation	General, news	Amharic
4	Addis Media Network (Addis TV)	General, news	Amharic, English
5	Tigrai Tv	General, news	Tigrigna, Amharic, Oromo, Qafar, Saho, Kunama, Arabic and English
6	Harari TV	General, news	Harari
7	SRTV	General, news	Somali
8	Debub TV	General, news	Amharic
9	Dire TV	General, news	Amharic, Somali language
10	Gambela TV	General, news	Amharic
11	Wolaita TV	General, news	Amharic, and Wolaitta
12	Gamo TV	General, news	Gamo and Amharic
13	Afar TV	General, news	Afar and Amharic
14	Keffa TV	General, news	Kafa and Amharic
15	Kembata TV	General, news	Kambaata and Amharic
16	Hadiya TV	General, news	Hadiyya and Amharic
17	Benishangul Gumuz Media (BGM)	General, news	Benishangul and Amharic
18	Southwest Media Network (on trail)	General, news	TBD

=== Digital cable services ===
Provider	Category	Language
DStv (South Africa)	General	Amharic, English
Webspirx IPTV (Ethiopia)	General	Amharic
CANAL+ (France)	General	Amharic, English
telestream(Ethiopia)	General	Amharic

=== Privately owned TV stations ===
#	Station	Category	Language
1	Channel 1	News & Entertainment	Amharic
2	A Plus TV	Entertainment	Amharic
3	Kana TV	General Entertainment	Amharic
4	Nabad TV	News, Entertainment	Somali
5	LTV Ethiopiaclosed	Culture	Amharic
6	EBS TV	News and Entertainment	Amharic
7	YA TV	News and Entertainment	Amharic
8	ENN TVclosed	News	Amharic
9	JTV Ethiopiaclosed	News and Entertainment	Amharic
10	Nahoo TV	News and entertainment	Amharic
11	Walta TVmerge with fana	News	Amharic
12	Fana TV	News	Amharic
13	Aleph TVclosed	General entertainment	Amharic
14	Afrihealth TV	Health	Amharic
15	ARTS TV	News Entertainment	Amharic
16	DW TV	General News	Tigrigna
17	Bisrat TV	General entertainment	Amharic
18	Asham TV	News, entertainment	Amharic
19	AHADU TV	News entertainment	Amharic
20	Asrat	General News	Amharic
21	ESAT	General news	Amharic
22	Balageru TV	General Entertainment	Amharic
23	ABN TV	News, entertainment	Amharic
24	Ye Ethiopia Lijoch TV	Children's channel	Amharic
25	TV 9 Ethio	News Entertainment	Amharic
26	Sidaama Broadcasting Corporation (SBC)	General News	Sidamian
27	TMH TV	General News	Tigrigna
28	OBS TV	General entertainment	Afaan Oromoo
29	Qubee TV	News, Educational and entertainment	Afaan Oromoo
30	OMN	News Entertainment	Afaan Oromoo
31	FIB	News Entertainment	Afaan Oromoo
32	ONN	Politics	Afaan Oromoo
33	NBC ETHIOPIA	Entertainment	Amharic
34	Channel 29	News and entertainment	Tigrigna
35	Zee Alem	Indian entertainment	Amharic
36	Abol TV	entertainment	Amharic
37	Hagerie TV	News and entertainment	Amharic
38	Yegna TV	News and entertainment	Amharic
39	Abbay Media TV	News and entertainment	Amharic and Afaan Oromo
40	Merkato TV	Shopping	Amharic
41	TBS	News and entertainment	Tigrigna
42	EOTC	Regional News	Amharic
43	Prime media	News and entertainment	Amharic and Afaan oromo
44	TBS TV (Tigray Broadcasting Secvice)	News and entertainment	Tigrigna

=== Religious broadcasters ===
#	Station	Category	Language
1	Africa TV 1	Islam	Amharic, Afaan Oromo, Tigrigna
2	Zawya TV	Islam	Amharic
3	Nuuralhudaa TV	Islam	Afaan Oromo
4	NesihaSasikumarTV HD	Islam	Amharic, Tigrigna, Afar, Somali, Silte, Guragigna, Hadiya, Afaan Oromo, Welene, Kebenna
5	Hamiltan TV	Islam	Afaan Oromo
6	As-Sunnah TV	Islam	Amharic, Harari, Silte
7	tvislaamaa	Islam	Afaan Oromo, Amharic, Tigrigna, English
8	Harima Tv	Islam	Amharic
9	BST (Bilal Satellite Television)	Islam	Amharic
10	Minber TV	Islam	Amharic, Afaan Oromo, Afar, Somali
11	Daewa Tv	Islam	Amharic
12	Yebereka Lejoch Tv	Islam	Amharic
13	Nuur TV	Islam	Afaan Oromo
14	EOTC TV	Ethiopian Orthodox	Amharic, Afaan Oromoo, Tigrigna
15	EOTC MK	Ethiopian Orthodox	Amharic, Afaan Oromoo, Tigrigna
16	Aleph TV	Ethiopian Orthodox	Amharic
17	Oromia Clergy Network (OCN)	Ethiopian Orthodox	Afaan Oromo
18	Christ Army TV	Protestant	Amharic
19	Bethel TV	Protestant	Amharic
20	Vision TV	Protestant	Amharic
21	JPS TV	Protestant	Amharic
22	JSL TV	Protestant	Amharic
23	Holy TV	Protestant	Amharic
24	CJ TV	Protestant	Amharic
25	Jesus TV	Protestant	Amharic
26	El Shaddai Television Network (ETN HD)	Protestant	Amharic
27	Presence TV	Protestant	Amharic
28	Elhori TV	Protestant	Amharic
29	Elohi TV	Protestant	Amharic
30	MO'A TV HD	Protestant	Afaan Oromo
31	Arara TV	Protestant	Afaan Oromo
32	GMM TV ethiopia	Protestant	Amharic
33	Anointing TV	Protestant	Amharic
34	Christ Mission	Protestant	Amharic
35	Holy Sprit TV	Protestant	Amharic
36	Marcil TV	Protestant	Amharic
37	Evangelical TV HD	Protestant	Amharic
38	Glory TV ETH	Protestant	Amharic
39	Fover TV	Protestant	Amharic
40	WW TV	Protestant	Amharic
41	7 Spirit TV	Protestant	Amharic
42	Rehobot TV HD	Protestant	Amharic
43	CC TV Ethiopia	Protestant	Amharic
44	IFtiin TV	Protestant	Amharic
45	LJ TV Worldwide	Protestant	Amharic
46	Hope Channel Ethiopia	Seventh-Day Adventist (SDA)	Afan Oromo, Amharic, Tigrigna

=== Weekly market share ===
Source: Kantar-Geopoll Media Measurement for Ethiopia (March 2017)

Rank	Channel	Parent Company	Market Share
1	Kana TV	Moby Group	34%
2	EBC 1	Ethiopian Broadcasting Corp.	18%
3	EBS TV	EBS	16%
4	JTV Ethiopia	JTV	10%
5	ETV Meznagna	Ethiopian Broadcasting Corp.	5%
6	Nahoo TV	Nahoo LLC	4%
7	CNN	Turner	3%
8	Ethiopia today	Ethiopian Government	3%
9	BBC Amharic	British Government	3%
10	Other	---	4%

=== Top 10 programs (March 2017) ===
Rank	Program	Channel	TV Rating
1	Zalim Istanbul / ሽሚያ "Shimya"	Kana TV	15.2*
2	Cennet'in Gözyaşları / ያልታበሰ እንባ "Yaltabese Emba"	Kana TV	14.6*
3	Siyah Beyaz Aşk / ድርና ማግ "Dir Ena Mag"	Kana TV	14.0*
4	Doğduğun Ev Kaderindir / ስበት "Sibet"	Kana TV	13.9*
5	Öyle Bir Geçer Zaman ki / ማዕበል "Maebel"	Kana TV	13.6*
6	#Time / #ጊዜ "#Time"	Kana TV	12.5*
7	Kadın (TV series) / ያልተፈታ ህልም "Yaltefeta Hilm"	Kana TV	11.35*
8	Kayıp / ፍርደኞቹ "Firdegnochu"	Kana TV	11.0*
9	Seifu on EBS ሰይፉ በ ኢቢኤስ "Seifu On EBS"	EBS TV	10.96*
10	Ethiopian Broadcasting Corporation / "EBC News"	EBC	10.5*

== See also ==
- Ethiopian Broadcasting Corporation
- Media in Ethiopia
- Culture of Ethiopia
