= Mass media in Ethiopia =

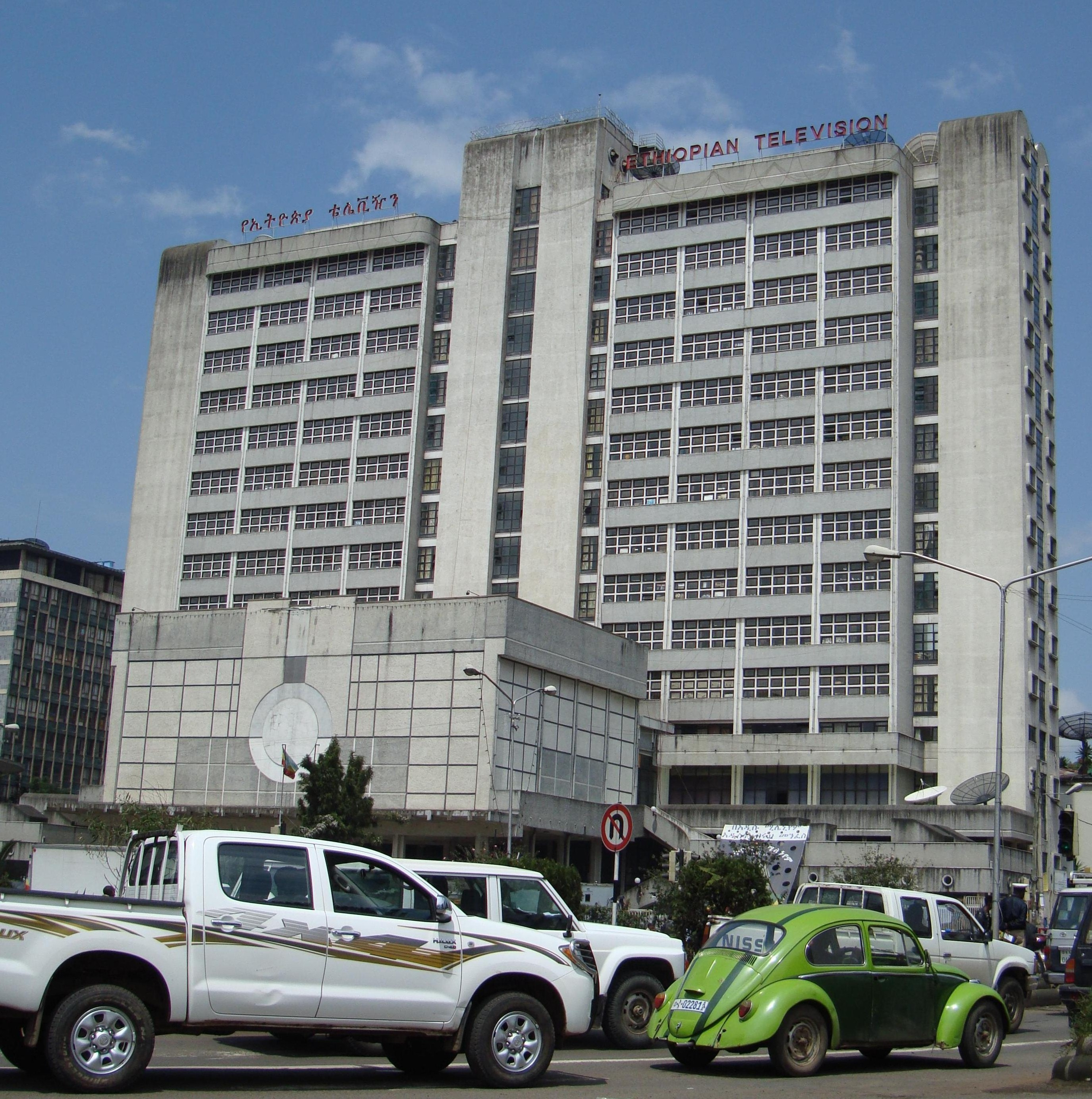
The Ethiopian Broadcasting Corporation headquarters in Addis Ababa

The mass media in Ethiopia consist of radio, television and the Internet, which remain under the control of the Ethiopian government, as well as private newspapers and magazines. Ten radio broadcast stations, eight AM and two shortwave, are licensed to operate in Ethiopia. The major radio broadcasting stations include Radio Fana (or "Torch") a private station, Radio Voice of One Free Ethiopia, and the Voice of the Revolution of Tigray. The only terrestrial (broadcast) television networks are government owned and include EBC (24 hours of broadcast) and other regional stations (i.e. Addis TV, TV Oromiyaa, Amhara TV). In keeping with government policy, radio broadcasts occur in a variety of languages including Amharic, Afaan Oromo, Tigrinya, and more. There are also many video sharing websites which are a popular way of getting information as well as entertainment in Ethiopia.

Satellite television has been very popular in Ethiopia for many years, with people often watching foreign channels in English and Arabic due to the lack of choice in the Ethiopian television industry. For many years, the only private satellite channel in Ethiopia was EBS TV (established in 2008). However, starting in 2016, a number of new satellite channels serving the Ethiopian market started broadcasting in the main local language of Amharic. Many of these new channels focused on infotainment, as this type of programming had been for the most part lacking in the past. Most popular of these channels being Kana TV, which focused on providing dubbed foreign dramas, very popular in Ethiopia, to their audiences. Since the end of the Ethiopian Civil War private newspapers and magazines have started to appear, and this sector of the media market, despite heavy-handed regulation from the government and the ups and downs of Ethiopian economy, continues to grow. Despite increasing pressure from the current government at home, the much more affluent and cosmopolitan Ethiopian diaspora abroad has helped further the cause for a free press in Ethiopia, and has also catered to its many extra-national communities with news services (both online and off) in both Amharic and English.

== History ==
There have been three major forces involved in the evolution of media in Ethiopia: (1) the need to communicate information about Ethiopia to the external world in order to create an international awareness of Ethiopia and its leaders, (2) the need for internal communication to provide information and to develop a sense of national identity and, later (3) the need to utilize media for education and the development of a healthy and literate work force. The first two of the three forces came into play in the late 1920s when it was decided that Ethiopia should have a radio system. Ras Tafari Mekonnen (later Emperor Haile Selassie I) was especially interested at this time in the new technology of wireless communication and "initiated many radio projects with the object of establishing suitable links both inside and outside Ethiopia as rapidly as possible...it was decided that a radio station should be built permitting direct communication with Europe".

A tender was granted to the Ansaldo Corporation of Italy in 1928 for the construction of a one-kilowatt station; the formal contract was signed in 1931. The station would facilitate wireless "telegraphy and telephony at Akaki [where] the foundation was laid on July 21, 1931". The Ethiopian Government took formal possession of the radio station on 31 January 1935; on 13 September 1935, the Emperor's first appeal to the world was broadcast.

The Italians took over the station in 1936 and planned to develop it into a communications center for their new empire, joining those already established in Somalia and in Asmara (Radio Marina). A more powerful radio station of seven kilowatts was started by the Italians in 1937 and taken over by the British in 1941. The British returned the one-kilowatt station to the Ethiopians but maintained the seven-kilowatt station. In 1942, the Press and Information Department in the Ministry of Pen assumed responsibility for broadcasting.

During the period of 1941–45, the seven-kilowatt station was not in operation; this created a point of contention between Haile Selassie and the British authorities. Radio broadcasts began in 1941 on the one kilowatt station with a staff of seven, broadcasting four hours a day in Amharic, Arabic and English.

In the 1950s, the Imperial Bodyguard operated its own station, broadcasting from a one-kilowatt short-wave transmitter. Also during the period, an agreement was signed with the World Lutheran Foundation in 1959 that led to the establishment of Radio Voice of the Gospel in the 1960s. The main activity during this period, however, was planning.

The role of broadcasting in national development and the media's role in creating an educated labor force grew out of the activities of the Point Four Program" and were also a feature of the $2.5 million technical assistance agreement signed in 1957. The Ethiopians installed a one-kilowatt transmitter in 1961 followed by its first high-power short wave facility in 1964. A further plan evolved to build high-power medium wave transmitters in Addis Ababa, Asmara and Harrar.

Television was first broadcast in 1962 during the initial meeting of the Organization of African Unity. Regular broadcast television started in November 1964 with original transmitter and studio located in the City Hall. Broadcasts of news, locally produced and imported programming started at about 5:30 pm and lasted until 11:00 pm.

Governed by the Ministry of Education, Ethiopian Educational Television (EET) went on the air in October 1965. Programming during the mourning hours, the service grew to 15 programs a week to 50 schools with a total student population of 48,000. Along with educational radio (EER) in 1968, radio and television production facilities were added and/or expanded and the name was changed to the Ethiopian Mass Media Center (EMMC). It primarily serviced in-school education; some adult education programs were added in 1970.

The topography of Ethiopia was an especially difficult impediment to developing a broadcasting system that could offer programming to the entire population of the country. Not only internal, but also external communications to the rest of the world was difficult because of distance. In addition to this, language differences as well as language policies have a significant impact on programming. One last significant element in describing Ethiopian broadcasting is its commitment to the use of media for both formal and non-formal education.

The Ethiopian Broadcasting Service (EBS) included Radio Ethiopia and Ethiopian Television. The Imperial Board of Telecommunications (IBTE) was established in 1952 to install and maintain telecommunications facilities. An Imperial Order declared the Ethiopian Broadcasting Service "an autonomous public Authority within the Imperial Ethiopian Government" and, while operating under the direction, control and supervision of the Ministry of Information, it is subject to IBTE's licensing and authorization powers. In 1974, the government was involved in both radio and television broadcasting.

Radio had already started in 1935, whereas television began broadcasting in 1962. Radio Ethiopian main transmissions were broadcast simultaneously on both short and medium wave. There were three main stations: a 100 kW station in Harar, a 50 kW station just outside of Asmara and a 100 kW station in Addis Ababa. Programs were also broadcast from a 10 kW station in Addis Ababa. Short wave services were broadcast from a station in Suggosa. The home service broadcast in Amharic, Tigrinya, English, Afar, Arabic, French and Oromiffa. The two regional stations rebroadcast the programs from Addis Ababa every night except for 15:00-17:00. During that two hour block, the following was transmitted: Harar broadcast in Oromiffa from 15:00 to 16:30 and Somali from 16:30-17:00; Asmara broadcast in Tigre from 15:00-15:45 and Tigrinya from 15:45-17:00.

In 1974, the Ethiopian Television service broadcast black and white programs from two studios in the City Hall in Addis Ababa to approximately 25,000 sets. Evening programs started at 7:00 pm with educational programming which was followed by imported syndicated shows such as Star Trek and The Donna Reed Show. A majority of the time was taken up by news in Amharic, English and French and to locally produced programming. Regular in-school broadcasts were broadcast from 9:00-11:40 am.

In Ethiopia, educational programming is independent and programming is produced and broadcast by the Ministry of Education. Both radio and television programs are produced at the Mexico Square facility of the EMMC. In 1972, the decision was made in the Educational Sector Review to maintain television but to emphasize radio as an educational tool.

The television section produced ten programs a week which were broadcast in the morning for elementary and junior secondary students in grades three to eight by the Ethiopian Television Service from their central transmitter as well as the translator stations at Nazret and Debre Zeyit. Programs were 20 minutes in length and covered subjects such as social science, geography, English, general science and mathematics. Programs were originally broadcast from the EBS low power transmitter on the Jimma road then, utilizing the EBS main transmitters, programs were transmitted to Addis Ababa, Harar and Asmara. In 1973, the government of the Netherlands gave funds for a transmitter dedicated to educational programming in Wolaita Sodo. The Ethiopians built another in Laga Dadi, near Addis Ababa.

Two outside broadcasting entities were Radio Voice of the Gospel and the Kagnew station in Asmara (1969). Kagnew station was a military communications installation in Asmara operated by the American Armed Forces radio and television service. Radio Voice of the Gospel, operated by the Lutheran World Broadcasting Service, was an international broadcasting station located just outside Addis Ababa. It utilized two 100 kW short wave transmitters to broadcast to Africa, China, India, Sri Lanka and the Middle East. Some limited programming produced in Amharic, English and French was broadcast to local audiences utilizing a 1 kW medium wave transmitter.

== Newspapers ==
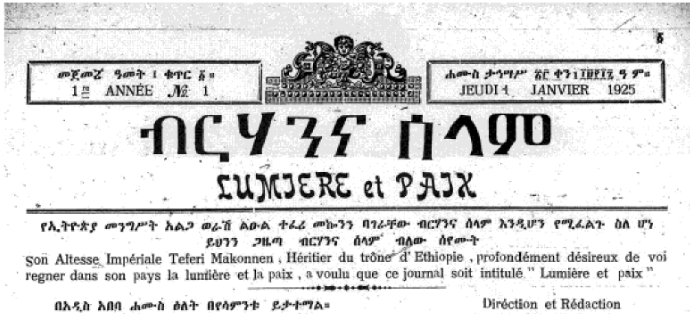
First issue of Berhanena Selam.

Printed religious books written in Ge'ez and printed in Europe were distributed in Tigray in the 1600s. Domestic printing press work began in 1863 by Swedish and Italian missionaries. Newspapers began printing in the mid-1880s. In 1890, Italians began printing El Eritereo and in 1891 the publishing company Corriere Eritreo was launched. In 1905, an Amharic and French newspaper, Le Semeur d'Ethiopie, began printing in Harar. In 1912, a newspaper in Tigrinya called Melkite Selam was launched.

In 1896, Emperor Menelik had Desta Mitiké write by hand a newspaper called YeBeir Dimts and then distributed carbon copies of this newspaper around the palace. The first government newspaper was Aimro, which began publication on January 17, 1901. The creation of the Amharic newspaper was ordered by Emperor Menelik. A Greek businessman, Andreas E. Kavadia, edited the newspaper. In 1906 the Ethiopian Government Printing Press was opened.

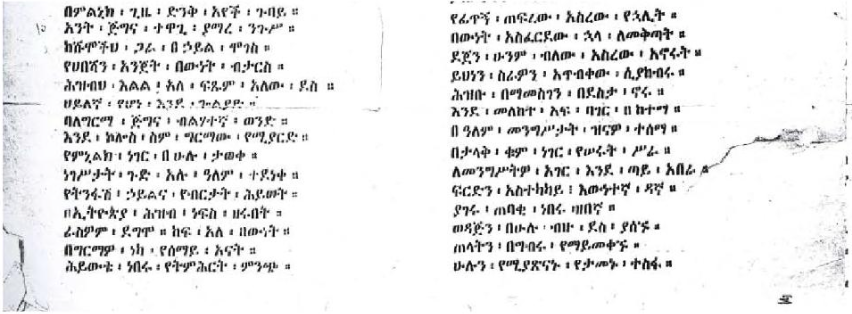
An excerpt from Aimro (Nehase 10, 1916 E.C.).

On January 1, 1925, Berhanena Selam was launched. The annual subscription rate was 5 birr and it was published on Thursdays.

Following the liberation of the country from Italian occupation during World War II, Emperor Haile Selassie established the Amharic language newspaper Addis Zemen on June 7, 1941. An English language equivalent, Ethiopian Herald, was launched in 1943. A government-run news agency, now called the Ethiopian News Agency, ran from 1942 to 1947, and then was relaunched in 1954.

Early twenty-first century Ethiopian newspapers can be broadly divided into two categories, Ethiopia based and diaspora based, with the majority of the diaspora-based ones being digital-only newspapers. The most widely circulated newspapers are Addis Fortune, Capital Ethiopia, Ethiopian Reporter, and Ethiopian Herald.

== Internet services ==
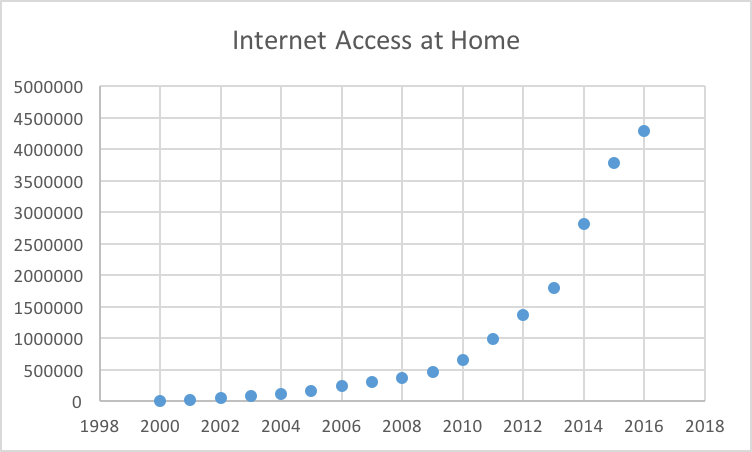
Number of Internet users with access at home.

The sole internet service provider is Ethio Telecom. There are about 4,300,000 people who can access internet at their home. It is harder to estimate the number of people who access the internet through internet café's which are much more popular and affordable.

== Television and radio channels ==
Television networks
Media	Network
Public networks	ETV News
Public networks	ETV Entertainment
Public networks	ETV Language
Public networks	Harar TV
Public networks	OBN
Public networks	Tigray TV
Public networks	Wolaita TV
Public networks	Addis TV
Public networks	Amhara TV
Public networks	Debub TV
Private networks	Aleph TV
Private networks	AHADU
Private networks	Arts TV
Private networks	EBS TV
Private networks	OBS
Private networks	ENN TV
Private networks	EOTC TV
Private networks	ESAT
Private networks	Fana TV
Private networks	JTV Ethiopia
Private networks	OMN
Private networks	Kana TV
Private networks	LTV
Private networks	Nahoo TV
Private networks	Walta TV
Private networks	SMN
Private networks	ASRAT
Private networks	ONN
Private networks	ABN TV

Radio stations
Stations
Afro FM 105.3
Ahadu FM 94.3
Bisrat FM 101.1
EBC Radio 104.7
Ethio FM 107.8
Fana Radio 98.1
FM Addis 97.1
Sheger FM 102.1
Zami FM 90.7

== See also ==
- List of radio stations in Africa: Ethiopia
- List of television stations in Africa: Ethiopia
- Telecommunications in Ethiopia
- Telephone numbers in Ethiopia

== Bibliography ==
- "Ethiopia", Freedom of the Press, USA: Freedom House, 2016, OCLC 57509361
