= List of Oromo-language television channels =

This is a list of satellite television channels in Oromo language.

#	Name	Logo	Satellite	Genre	Website
1	Finfinne News Network (FNN)		Yahsat (11843-V-27500-3/4)	News, culture, entertainment, human rights	fnnmedia.org
2	Oromia Media Network (OMN)		Eutelsat (11555-V-27500-3/4)	news and political	Oromiamedia.com
3	Oromia Broadcasting Network (OBN)		Ethiosat (11512-H-27500-3/4)	Generalist channel	obnoromia.com
4	OBN horn of Africa		Eutelsat (11137-H-27500-5/6)	news and cultural	obnoromia.com
5	Oromia Broadcasting Service (OBS)		Eutelsat(11095-H-27500-7/8)	infotainment	
6	Finfinne Integrated Broadcasting (FIB)		Eutelsat (11178-H-27500-7/8)	Infotainment	
7	TV Amantii Islaamaatiifii Seenaa Oromo				
8	Oromia News Network (ONN)		Eutelsat (11178-H-27500-7/8)	political	
9	Gada News Network (GNN)		Eutelsat (10727-H-27500-7/8)	news and political	
10	New Africa Oromo		Eutelsat (11766-H-27500-5/6)	news	
11	Nuuralhudaa			Islamic	nuuralhudaa.com
12	TV Islaamaa		E7WA MENA (11392-V-27500-7/8)	Islamic	tvislaamaa.org
13	Hamilton TV		Eutelsat (11555-v-27500-3/4)	Islamic	
14	Oromia Islamic TV (Oromiait)			Islamic	
15	Mo'aa TV		Eutelsat (10727-H-27500-5/6)	evengelical and entertainment	
16	Araara Tv		Eutelsat (11095-H-27500-7/8)	evengelical	
17	Ifa Fayyinaa		Eutelsat (11095-H-27500-7/8)	evengelical	
18	Danda'aa TV		E7WA MENA (10815-H-27500-5/6)	evengelical	

== Channels with Oromo program ==
- VAO 24
- BBC Horn of Africa
- Fana BC
- ETV Language
- Dimtsi Weyane
- Dire TV
- Harari TV
- Amhara TV
- Prime Media (12604-27500-(4/5)

== See also ==
- Mass media in Ethiopia
