= DJ Kingston =

Ethiopian DJ

- ዲጄ ኪንግስተን
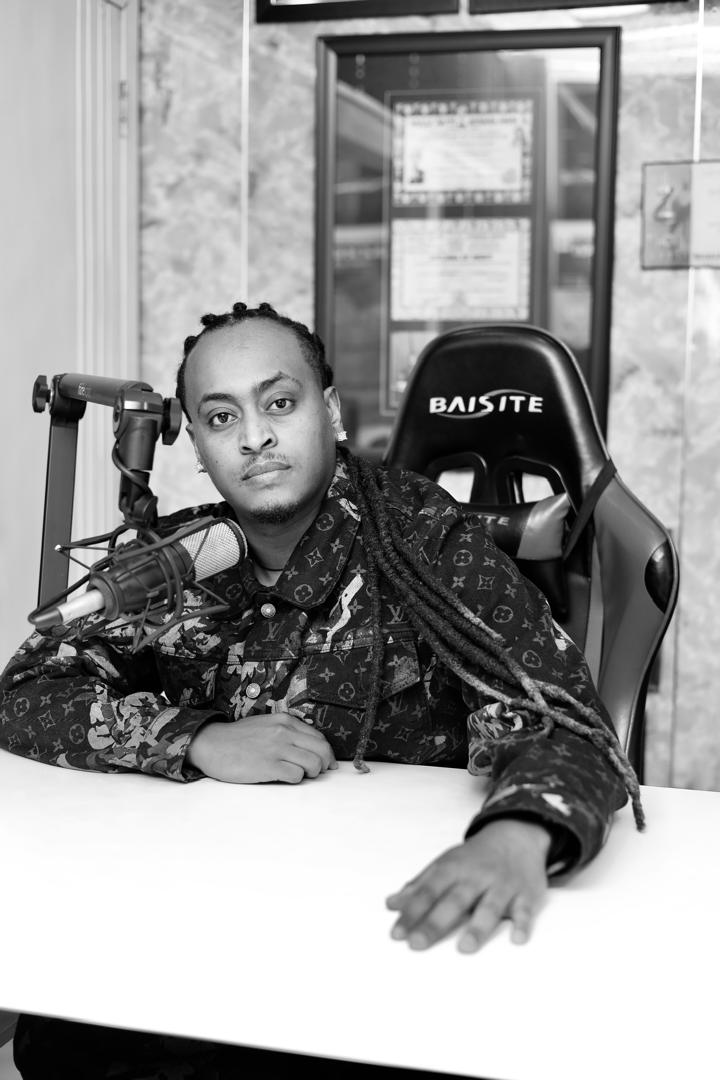
- DJ Kingston in 2024
- Born: Addis Ababa, Ethiopia
- Occupation: Radio personality
- Years active: 2014–present
- Known for: Hosting Wez Wez Addis on Bisrat FM 101.1
- Notable work: Wez Wez Addis
- Spouse: Rizvan Selashi
- Children: Tekta, Jona
- Awards: Abyssinia Award for Best Radio DJ (2017/18); Media Award for Best Radio DJ (2024)

DJ Kingston (Amharic: ዲጄ ኪንግስተን) is an Ethiopian radio personality and DJ best known for hosting Wez Wez Addis (ወዝወዝ አዲስ), a weekday morning program on Bisrat FM 101.1. Active in Ethiopian Media for over a decade, Kingston is recognized for his blend of music broadcasting, humor, and cultural commentary.

== Career ==
DJ Kingston began his radio career at Addis Ababa Communication FM 96.3, where he hosted the program Gojo Music. In 2014, he joined Bisrat FM 101.1 and launched Wez Wez Addis, which quickly became known for its interactive segments, interviews, and modern take on Ethiopian radio culture.

Outside of his radio work, Kingston has performed as a live DJ at various events and participated in cultural and community-focused programs throughout Addis Ababa.

In 2018, Kingston was awarded the "Best Radio DJ" title at the Abyssinia Awards, which recognizes individuals in Ethiopian arts and media. In 2024, he received the Media Award for Best Radio DJ from the Ethiopian Media Awards, honoring excellence in national broadcasting.

He was interviewed as a guest on the talk show Seifu on EBS, where he emphasized the cultural role of radio, stating:

ራዲዮ እንደ ድምጽ ብቻ አይደለም፤ ይህ ኃይልን፣ እና ማህበራዊ ግንኙነትን ያመለከተ ነው።

Translation: "Radio is more than just sound—it's about power and social connection."

He was also featured in the televised segment DJ Kingston Talks Career and Influence, aired in early 2024.
