= ENN =

ENN may refer to:

== People ==
- Enn (given name)
- Hans Enn (born 1958), Austrian alpine skier

== Other uses ==
- ENN Group, a Chinese natural gas distribution company
- ENN TV, an Ethiopian news television channel
- Escapist News Network, a parody newscast
- Extension neural network
- Nenana Municipal Airport, in Alaska
