= Walta (disambiguation) =

Walta is an Ethiopian commercial media conglomerate

Walta may also refer to:

- Walta (Dogu'a Tembien), a municipality of Ethiopia
- Walta TV, an Ethiopian television network
- Ilona Walta, Finnish professional footballer
- Leo Walta, a Finnish professional footballer
- Walta, Microphone connector

== See also ==
- Valta (disambiguation)
