= Ethiosat =

Ethiopian communication satellite platform

Ethiosat (Amharic: ኢትዮሳት) is an Ethiopian communication satellite platform launched by the Information Network Security Agency (INSA) on 21 April 2017. The satellite hosts SES's NSS-12 satellite at 57 degrees East and provides 30 television channels for Ethiopian audience, the 12 are transmitted via high-definition standard.

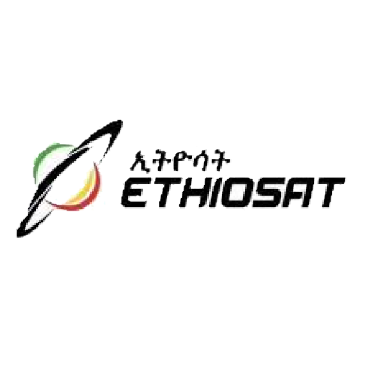
Logo of Ethiosat

In August 2019, Ethiosat was relaunched to relocate all channels platform based in Ethiopia.

== History ==
Ethiosat was launched on 21 April 2017 by the Information Network Security Agency (INSA) on 21 April 2017. It hosts SES's NSS-12 satellite at 57 degrees East with 30 television channels specifically for Ethiopian audience, 12 are transmitted through high-definition standard. To access the satellite direct-to-home (DTH), viewers should change the position of antenna with satellite antenna installer to access SES's NSS-12 satellite.

Ethiosat was relaunched in August 2019 to relocate all channels platform based in Ethiopia. In December 2020, the Ethiopian Broadcasting Authority announced that Ethiosat would reduce 10 million dollar broadcasters expenditure annually for the country. The authority Director-General Getachew Denqu explained that they concluded agreement with S.E.S Rental Company after seven months of negotiations. Accordingly, the agreement allows television stations to use Ethiosat as well as make competitive while reducing their expenses.

== List of TV channels ==
- EBC
- Fana TV
- Kana TV
- Walta TV
- Amhara TV
- Bistrat TV
- Asham TV
- JTV Ethiopia
- Balageru TV
- CNBC Africa Ethiopia Channel
- Minber TV
- VOA 24
- ARTS TV
- DW International
- Ahadu TV
- Dimtsi Weyane
- Mereja TV
