= Valtat =

Valtat is a surname. Notable people with the surname include:

- Jean-Christophe Valtat, French writer and teacher
- Jules Édouard Valtat, French sculptor
- Louis Valtat, French painter and printmaker associated with the Fauves

== See also ==
- Valta (disambiguation)
