= Valta =

Valta may refer to:

- Jiří Valta, a retired Czech football midfielder
- Hermann von Valta, a German bobsledder
- Välta, a village in Saaremaa Parish, Saare County in western Estonia

== See also ==
- Valtat
- Walta (disambiguation)
