= Channel 1 (Ethiopia) =

Ethiopian television channel

- Type: Television channel and online streaming service
- Country: Ethiopia
- Founded: 2025
- Headquarters: Addis Ababa, Ethiopia
- Key people: Samuel Debebe (founder and CEO)
- Launch date: 2025
- Official website: channel1.et
- Language: Amharic

Channel 1 (Amharic: ቻነል 1) is an Ethiopian television channel headquartered in Addis Ababa. It brands itself in Amharic as "አንድ ለእኛ" ("One for Us") and in English as "The Heartbeat of Ethiopia". According to its own website, the channel was established in 2025. The channel is led by founder and chief executive Samuel Debebe.

== History ==
Channel 1 was teased on social media as early as July 2025, when content posted with the channel's branding carried the caption "Channel 1 TV coming soon". Promotional material posted on the channel's official TikTok account in late October 2025 announced the brand under the slogan "ቻናል 1 አንድ ለኛ" ("Channel 1 – One for Us"). In the same period, the channel issued an Amharic-language press statement, published on its YouTube channel, announcing that it was preparing to begin regular broadcasts.

Marketing coverage of the launch described Channel 1 as "officially launched under the leadership of veteran showrunner Samuel Debebe" and as "positioning itself as an entertainment-first" outlet in what it called Ethiopia's "fast-evolving media landscape". The channel's own "About Us" page states that it was "established in 2025, and headquartered in addis Ababa, with a mission to set a new standard in local broadcasting – combing creativity, credibility and commercial value", and that its leadership and creative teams "have shaped the landscape of Ethiopia television".

== Programming ==
Its website lists the following content categories: entertainment (family and culture, drama, music, comedy, sport), lifestyle shows, family and culture (health, wellness, beauty and kids), news and current affairs, and kids and educational shows.

Flagship programs advertised by the channel include:

- ቅዳሜኛ (Qdamenya), described as a flagship Saturday show "that every family member should watch".
- እሁድን 1 ላይ (Ehudn 1 Lay), a Sunday lifestyle and entertainment variety show, promoted for broadcast on Sundays from 6:00.
- 25ቱ ቃላት (25tu Qalat), a game show aimed at families.
- አንድ 1 ህጎች (And 1 Higoch), an educational program about Ethiopian law, presented as "a fun and creative way to learn about the laws of the country".
- a law-focused show titled Andi Andi Higoch, which the channel's promotional site describes as translating "complex legal concepts into clear" everyday language.
- ቻነል 1 ስፖርት (Channel 1 Sport), promoted for broadcast every Monday and Friday at 3:00.

The channel sells advertising and sponsorship packages, including product placement, social media extensions on TikTok and YouTube, and "weekend takeover packages".

== Distribution ==
Channel 1 promotes satellite reception parameters of 11545 (or 11544) MHz, horizontal polarisation, symbol rate 45000, on its official TikTok account. This transponder corresponds to the 11545 H DVB-S2 slot on the NSS-12 satellite at 57.0° East, the orbital position used by the Ethiosat platform that carries Ethiopian free-to-air channels.

The channel also streams online. Its website advertises a mobile application for iOS and Android offering live TV, on-demand viewing, scheduling and reminders, with app-store links described as "going live at launch". As of September 2026, its official YouTube channel, "@Channel1.Ethiopia", listed approximately 185,000 subscribers and more than 2,300 uploaded videos. The channel also maintains official accounts on TikTok, Instagram and Telegram.

== Leadership ==
Samuel Debebe is identified on the channel's website as "Founder, CEO". His public X (formerly Twitter) profile describes him as "Co-founder / CEO – Channel 1 TV" and as a "Director / producer".
