= Seifu on EBS =

Ethiopian late-night talk show

- Genre: Comedy; Talk show
- Created by: Seifu Fantahun
- Presented by: Seifu Fantahun
- Starring: Habesha Band; Kignet Band
- Country of origin: Ethiopia
- Original language: Amharic
- No. of seasons: 4
- No. of episodes: 80

Production
- Production locations: Seifu on EBS Studios, Addis Ababa, Ethiopia
- Running time: 65 minutes
- Production companies: EBS, Seifu Printing and Advertisement Company

Original release
- Network: EBS TV
- Release: 24 October 2013 – present

Seifu on EBS is an Ethiopian late-night talk show hosted by comedian and radio personality Seifu Fantahun. Broadcast every Sunday at 9:00 p.m. Ethiopian Time on EBS TV, the 90-minute Amharic-language program reaches viewers across Ethiopia as well as the global Ethiopian diaspora. Since its debut in late 2013—listed variably as 24 October or 8 November 2013—the series has adapted the traditional American late-night television model for a family-oriented Ethiopian audience, combining topical opening monologues, sketch comedy, live music, and celebrity interviews.

Beyond linear broadcast, individual episodes routinely draw hundreds of thousands of views on digital platforms. While noted for sparking public conversation around everyday social topics, the program has occasionally attracted scrutiny for airing heated personal disputes framed as light entertainment rather than investigative reporting.

== Production and overview ==
Seifu on EBS is produced in-house by EBS TV at its studios in Addis Ababa, without external co-producers. Filmed in front of a studio audience, each 90-minute broadcast (inclusive of commercial breaks) is anchored by Fantahun, who was already a prominent Ethiopian radio host and comic prior to launching the series. Drawing directly from Western late-night conventions, the show balances satirical news commentary with casual guest banter and cultural references tailored to Ethiopian weekend viewers. Over its run, the program has surpassed 300 episodes.

== Episode format ==
Each installment follows a six-act structure modeled on American late-night programming:

- Act 1: Opening monologue
- Act 2: Comedy sketches or audience games
- Acts 3–4: Primary guest interview (split across two segments)
- Act 5: Secondary guest interview
- Act 6: Live musical act or stand-up performance, followed by the sign-off

Guests are drawn from across Ethiopian public life, including actors, musicians, authors, athletes, business leaders, and political figures.

=== Opening monologue ===
Episodes open with Fantahun delivering a stand-up monologue centered on the week's current events, social media trends, and popular culture, occasionally supported by on-screen photos and video clips. Relying on Amharic wordplay, rapid-fire delivery, and observational satire, the opener sets a lighthearted tone before transitioning into scripted or improvised comedy segments. While touching on politics and social norms, the humor remains calibrated for family viewing on EBS TV.

=== Comedy segments ===
Following the monologue, Fantahun leads interactive studio games or performs in sketches alongside guests. Visiting stand-up comedians—such as Thomas Olema, or the duo Kibebew Geda and Meskerem Bekele—regularly appear in short routines poking fun at everyday Ethiopian social habits. Clips of unscripted banter and bloopers from these segments frequently circulate on YouTube and have contributed substantially to the show's online reach across more than 345 episodes.

=== Guest interviews ===
Conducted from a traditional talk-show desk, the interview segments run roughly 15 to 25 minutes and center on one-on-one conversations regarding a guest's career, personal life, and views on Ethiopian society. Fantahun combines informal humor with direct questioning, occasionally incorporating archival clips or audience participation.

Past interviewees span entertainment, business, and public affairs, including singer Bezawit Mesfin (2015), diplomatic envoys, and artist Kiros Haile Selassie, who used a 2025 appearance to advocate for Ethiopian audiobooks. Because interviews are largely unscripted, discussions have occasionally generated on-air friction.

=== Musical and variety performances ===
Closing segments typically showcase five- to ten-minute live performances by Ethiopian singers, bands, and dancers. Featured musicians have included vocalists Hana Girma ("Cheraqa", December 2019), Dawit Tsige (January 2020), Addisu Legesse, and Henok Abebe, alongside fusion groups such as Jano Band ("Abeba Ina Nib", December 2019). Non-musical acts have ranged from choreographer Ephrem Amare's "Sey" dance routine (February 2019) to novelty performer Asgegnew Ashko's "Dendesho" (May 2016), as well as multi-artist specials such as the June 2024 Olympic Concert.

== History ==
=== Launch and early years (2013–2015) ===
When Seifu on EBS premiered in late 2013 (Hidar 2006 E.C.), Ethiopian television schedules were dominated by news bulletins and scripted dramas. Leveraging Fantahun's existing radio fanbase, the program quickly secured domestic sponsors and high-profile guests—such as singer Eneye Takele—without relying on syndicated foreign content. Operating within Ethiopia's tightly regulated media environment, the early seasons focused largely on apolitical entertainment and established the weekly Sunday format that remained intact in subsequent years.

=== Digital expansion (2016–present) ===
While retaining its original on-air structure through Ethiopia's 2018 political transition under Prime Minister Abiy Ahmed, the show significantly expanded its international footprint online. Beginning around 2017, EBS began uploading full broadcasts and highlight clips to YouTube, turning the program into a major touchpoint for the Ethiopian diaspora. By 2024, EBS TV had also added live digital streaming across platforms including Roku, allowing overseas viewers to watch Sunday broadcasts in real time.

== Reception and impact ==
=== Ratings and digital reach ===
Seifu on EBS has consistently ranked among EBS TV's flagship titles. According to Q2 2017 industry polling, EBS held a 17.6% national audience share (second behind Kana TV's 31.1%), before overtaking Kana TV in early 2019 as Ethiopia's most-watched channel—with Seifu on EBS ranking fourth among EBS's top programs behind Yaseb Chawata, news broadcasts, and Ehuden be EBS. Survey data from April–June 2024 indicated that EBS captured roughly 75% of urban TV viewership in measured areas, with the Sunday 9:00 p.m. broadcast airing during peak evening hours.

Online, the official Seifu on EBS YouTube channel has accumulated over 2.15 million subscribers and more than 531 million cumulative views, with individual episodes regularly surpassing one million views shortly after broadcast.

=== Awards and philanthropy ===
Commentators and viewers have credited the series with popularizing modern talk-show entertainment in Ethiopia and regularly attracting major public figures. In October 2025, Fantahun received the African Impact Award in recognition of his media influence. The program has also served as a fundraising platform, notably helping mobilize more than 1 billion Ethiopian birr during the initial phase of the Mekedonia charity campaign, for which Fantahun received formal commendations from organizers and government bodies.

=== Criticism ===
Critics have linked the show's credibility to broader controversies surrounding EBS TV, including a 2019 dispute over remarks by Fantahun on Sheger FM that were reposted to EBS channels, as well as the March 2025 suspension of the EBS program New Chapter by the Ethiopian Media Authority over false reporting. Additionally, some observers contend that the show's emphasis on lightweight sketches and celebrity promotion limits serious engagement with complex social issues.

== Controversies ==
- 2013 Teddy Afro plagiarism dispute: Prior to or during the show's launch period, Fantahun drew backlash from fans of singer Teddy Afro after publicly accusing the musician of uncredited sampling, sparking wider debate over copyright norms in Ethiopian music without resulting in legal action.
- 2014 Dubai airport detention report: In February 2014, Fantahun publicly disputed a report by the outlet Ethiopikalink claiming he had been arrested in Dubai, stating that he had instead been held for 24 hours due to a visa-processing delay.
- 2016 contempt of court conviction: On 14 June 2016, Fantahun pleaded guilty before an Ethiopian federal court to contempt of court over on-air remarks deemed disrespectful to the judiciary, and was released on bail the following day.
- Guest disputes and rebuttals: The show has frequently become a venue for public figures responding to personal or online scandals. In August 2014, an unscripted interview with filmmaker Haile Gerima drew debate over political commentary, while actor Girum Ermias's 2014 remarks regarding depictions of drug use in film provoked audience criticism without leading to on-air retractions. In December 2021, Hana Merhatsid and Nebyou Idris used an appearance to address public backlash over personal matters. In 2025, Fantahun faced social media criticism for inviting award nominee Yutinas while excluding fellow nominee Adonay, and later extended an on-air invitation to TikTok creator Adonay Berhane in November 2025 following influencer arrests. In June 2025, parties involved in runner Gelete Burka's divorce property dispute also announced plans to appear on the program to present their accounts.

== See also ==
- EBS TV
- Television in Ethiopia
