= Tigrai Television =

Media organization in Tigray region, Ethiopia

- Type: Radio network Television network Print media
- Country: Ethiopia
- Broadcast area: National and worldwide
- Network: Television, radio broadcast and print media
- Headquarters: Mekelle, Tigray Region, Ethiopia

Programming
- Languages: Tigrinya, Amharic, Oromo, Qafar, Saho, Kunama, Arabic and English
- Picture format: 1080i 16:9, 4:3 (HDTV); Downscaled to 576i for the SDTV feed

Ownership
- Owner: The Tigray National Regional State

History
- Launched: July 1991 (age 35)

Links
- Website: tigraitv.com/en/home/

Tigrai Television (Amharic: ቴሌቪዥን ትግራይ), also known as Tigrai TV and Tigrai Mass Media Agency, is a television, digital media, radio, and newspaper news organization owned by the Tigray Region government in Ethiopia. Tigray TV was first established on July 31, 1991, as part of Ethiopian Television, now known as the Ethiopian Broadcasting Corporation. It became an independent media organization on December 15, 2007, under the name Tigrai Mass Media Agency.

== Creation ==
Tigray Television (Tigrai TV) is a media organization owned by the Tigray Region government in Ethiopia. It was founded in 1991 as part of the Ethiopian Television and became independent in 2007. Tigrai TV offers news and information through television, digital media, radio, and newspapers. From 2006 to 2008 it continued its broadcast under the supervision of Tigray Information Bureau. Then after, Tigray Mass Media Tigray was formally established at agency level by the Tigray House of People's Representatives Proclamation 142/2000. Since 2017, the medium began its 24 hours broadcast in Tigrinya, Saho, Kunama languages, and lately Amharic, Oromo, Qafar, Arabic and English languages.

== Programs ==
Tigrai TV has many daily programs such as Internal news, International news, Political analysis, Business, Sport, etc.
