= Tigrai Broadcasting Service =

Ethiopian Tigrinya-language television news channel

- Type: Television network 2023–present
- Country: Ethiopia
- Broadcast area: National and worldwide
- Network: Television broadcast
- Headquarters: Mekelle, Tigray Region, Ethiopia

Programming
- Language(s): Tigrinya
- Picture format: 1080p (HDTV) & 576i

Ownership
- Owner: Private

Links
- Website: tvtbs.com

Social media
- Tigrai Broadcasting Service on Facebook

Tigrai Broadcasting Service (TBS or TBS TV, also spelled Tigray Broadcasting Service; Tigrinya: ኣገልግሎት ፈነወ ትግራይ) is the first privately owned infotainment TV station in Tigray, Ethiopia headquartered in Mekelle, the capital of Tigray, with the vision of being credible journalism and public interest. Owned by private broadcasting & media production company, it is a first-of-its-kind television network in Tigray, Ethiopia aimed to be a premier destination for news, current affairs, and infotainment programs from Ethiopia and the Horn of Africa. The channel broadcasts programming mainly in Tigrinya with some programming in Amharic, and English.

== History ==
Tigray Broadcasting Service was founded as a television station in 2023 by a group of Tigrayan artists with high profile and experience in writing, reporting, directing, etc.

== See also ==
- Television in Ethiopia
