= TeleStream (Ethio Telecom) =

Internet-based video streaming service by Ethio Telecom

teleStream
- Website type: Video streaming platform
- Founded: February 20, 2026
- Headquarters: Addis Ababa, Ethiopia, {{{location_country}}}
- Area served: Ethiopia
- Owner: Ethio Telecom
- Key people: Frehiwot Tamiru (CEO, Ethio Telecom)
- Industry: Streaming media, Entertainment
- Products: Live TV streaming, Video on demand
- Website: www.ethiotelecom.et/telestream/
- Registration: Required
- Current status: Active

teleStream is an internet-based video streaming service launched by Ethio Telecom, Ethiopia's state-owned telecommunications operator, on 20 February 2026. The platform delivers live television and video-on-demand content over the company's fiber, 4G, and 5G infrastructure, positioning itself as an alternative to traditional satellite television services.

== History ==
Ethio Telecom first announced plans to enter the streaming market in 2022 as part of its "LEAD" strategy, issuing requests for proposals for video streaming platform development. The service was officially launched on 20 February 2026 at the Science Museum in Addis Ababa, alongside a "Zero-Touch Digital System" for fixed broadband service delivery.

The launch formed part of Ethio Telecom's "Next Horizon: Digital & Beyond 2028" strategy, which aims to accelerate digital inclusion and position the company as a provider of advanced digital solutions beyond basic telecommunications connectivity.

== Features and content ==
At launch, teleStream offered access to over 60 live television channels and more than 350 video-on-demand titles. The platform emphasizes locally relevant content aligned with Ethiopian culture, values, and ethics, alongside international programming.

The service includes parental control features and requires no satellite dish installation, operating instead through fixed broadband Wi-Fi connections. Content is hosted on Ethio Telecom's local telecloud infrastructure, which the company states reduces latency and ensures service stability regardless of weather conditions.

== Technology and access ==
Users can access teleStream through fixed broadband connections or via SIM-enabled set-top boxes (STBs) that convert non-smart televisions into smart devices. The set-top box was initially priced at approximately 1,600 Ethiopian birr.

Subscription options include a one-off payment of 7,950 birr (discounted 33% from the regular price) or a 12-month installment plan requiring an initial payment of 1,590 birr followed by monthly payments. The service is bundled with fixed broadband packages and can be activated through the Telebirr SuperApp, Ethio Telecom's mobile money and digital service platform.

== Strategic objectives ==
Ethio Telecom designed teleStream to reduce Ethiopia's dependence on foreign satellite services, which require foreign currency expenditure for leasing. By hosting broadcasts on local infrastructure, the platform aims to eliminate forex losses associated with satellite leases while supporting national digital sovereignty.

The platform targets multiple sectors beyond residential entertainment. Educational institutions can utilize teleStream for remote learning and digital libraries, while healthcare facilities can distribute awareness information. Hotels and guest houses represent a key business segment, as the service allows these establishments to provide entertainment to guests without maintaining multiple satellite dishes.

== Infrastructure requirements ==
The service relies on Ethio Telecom's fiber network, which had reached 14,413 kilometers of metro fiber deployment by early 2026, with the capacity to serve 1.2 million customers. The company has migrated over 79,000 customers from legacy copper networks to fiber as part of its ongoing copper switch-off initiative.

== See also ==
- Digital Ethiopia 2030
- Mass media in Ethiopia
