= Addis Media Network =

- Type: Government media organization
- Branding: AMN
- Country: Ethiopia
- Headquarters: Addis Ababa, Ethiopia
- Owner: Addis Ababa City Administration
- Official website: www.amn.gov.et

Addis Media Network (AMN; Amharic: አዲስ ሚዲያ ኔትወርክ) is a government media organization based in Addis Ababa, Ethiopia. It operates television, FM radio, print and digital media services.

== Overview ==
According to its official website, Addis Media Network is a government media outlet situated in Addis Ababa, and states that its vision is to be a main metropolitan media city in 2023 E.C. The organization states that it is the official owner of Addis TV, FM 96.3 Radio, the Addis Listen newspaper, and digital media outlets. Its Amharic-language website describes the organization as a media outlet owned by the Addis Ababa city administration and accountable to the city council. The Ministry of Justice lists Addis Media Network among government institutions.

== History ==
On Sene 22, 2016 E.C. (30 June 2024), Mayor of Addis Ababa Adanech Abebe announced that Addis Media Network had reorganized itself and launched a new television channel, together with rebranding work and a talent show. In her announcement, Adanech described the network as "the voice of our city", stating that it serves the city's residents by informing, educating and entertaining them, and that it has demonstrated in practice that it is a voice of diversity and of generations.

== Services ==
The network states that it owns Addis TV, FM 96.3 Radio, and the Addis Listen newspaper, as well as digital media outlets. Editions of the Addis Lissan (አዲስ ልሳን) newspaper are published on the network's website; for example, the Saturday, Tikimt 22, 2018 E.C. edition was posted on 31 October 2025.

== Recognition ==
In August 2026, the Addis Ababa City Council recognized Addis Media Network for what it described as exceptional coverage of the city's development, according to the network's own report.
