= Somali Region Television =

- Type: Television network
- Country: Ethiopia
- Broadcast area: National and worldwide
- Network: Television
- Headquarters: Jijiga, Somali Region, Ethiopia

Programming
- Language: Somali
- Picture format: 1080i 16:9 (HDTV); Downscaled to 576i for the SDTV feed

Ownership
- Owner: The Tigray National Regional State

History
- Launched: 2011 (age 14–15)

Somali Region Television (SRTV), formerly known as Ethiopian Regional Television (ESTV), is a television station based in Jijiga, capital of the Somali Region. The station broadcasts in Somali and owned by the state government through the State Communication Bureau. The station is receivable terrestrially to 95% of the region and abroad on satellite.

== History ==
ESTV was set up in 2011 to cater to the Ethiopian Somali diaspora. From 2014, the station became critical of the Ogaden National Liberation Front and aired songs favoring the Ethiopian-Somali Region State.

On 5 August 2025, SRTV journalist Khadar Mohamed Ismael was arrested by state police. He appeared in court without legal representation on 9 August regarding a deleted post from the channel's Facebook account the day prior to his arrest, where locals criticized the government.
