= Jiří Valta =

Czech footballer

Personal information
- Date of birth: 27 November 1972 (age 53)
- Height: 1.68 m (5 ft 6 in)
- Position: Midfielder

Senior career*
Years	Team	Apps	(Gls)
1992–1994	Hradec Králové		
1994–2000	Atlantic Lázně Bohdaneč		
2000	Svit Zlín		
2000–2002	AS Pardubice		
- * Club domestic league appearances and goals

Jiří Valta (born 27 November 1972) is a retired Czech football midfielder.
