= Jules Édouard Valtat =

French sculptor

- Born: August 7, 1838; Troyes, France
- Died: January 1871; Paris, France
- Education: École de dessin de Troyes, École nationale supérieure des beaux-arts
- Spouse: Ursula Mathelin

Jules Édouard Valtat, who was born August 7, 1838, in Troyes and died for his country during the Siege of Paris in January 1871, was a French sculptor.

== Biography ==
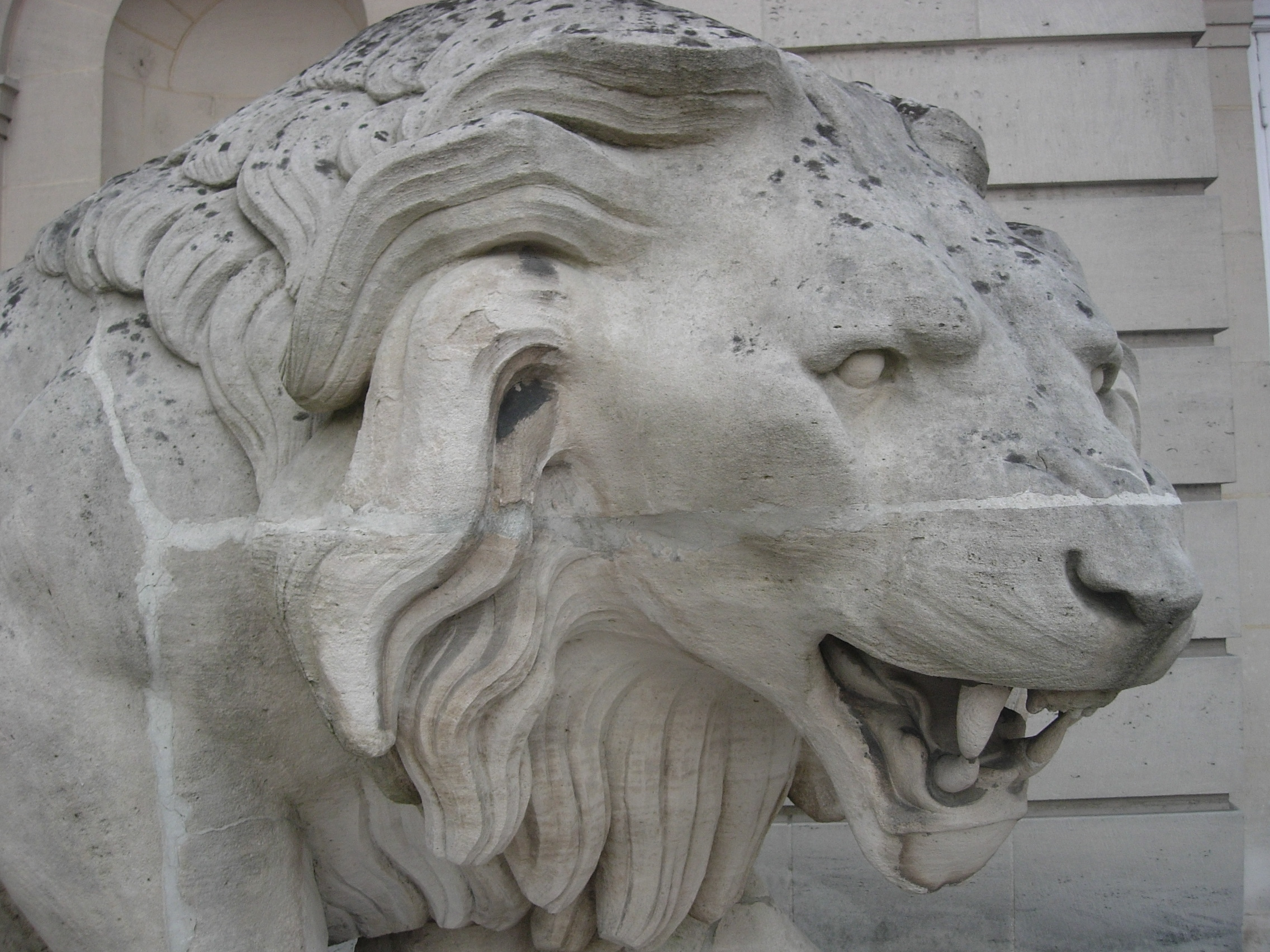
Lion in the Prefecture of Troyes. 48°17′52″N 4°4′42″E

Son of the sculptor François Joseph Valtat, Jules Édouard Valtat specialized in religious sculpture and sculpture of his wife Ursula Mathelin (Troyes.1815 -...). While young he had a taste for the arts and followed in the footsteps of his father. He became a student at the local art school in Troyes. They resided at his parents house on rue Pithou in Troyes. He continued his training in the workshop of Francisque Duret at the School of Fine Arts in Paris. He or his father had the idea of applying the molding process to achieve the production of religious statues [unclear].

He was appointed leader the group Faune et Bacchante (Wildlife and Bacchae) in 1859, to decorate the jardin d'acclimation in Paris whose architect Gabriel Davioud and landscape designer Jean-Pierre Barillet-Deschamps were given charge of the development work by the Société impériale zoologique d'acclimatation (Imperial Zoological Society of acclimatization) which was founded by Geoffroy St. Hilaire in 1854. The garden was opened on October 6, 1860, by Napoleon III.

Collector of architectural decoration, he donated to the museum of archaeology and natural history of his hometown, located in the former Abbey of Saint-Loup in Troyes, architectural elements like a fragment from the church steeple of Saint-Urbain, dating from the thirteenth century, or an epitaph from a sixteenth century tomb stone, and a keystone of an ossuary dating from the twelfth century from the church at Chesley.

This collection also includes La Femme drapée, a stone statue of the second half of the sixteenth century, from the chapel of the convent of the Cordeliers of Troyes demolished in 1833 which lacks the head, feet and the right arm.

Participating in the defense of the siege of Paris in January 1871, he was shot at during an outing against the Prussians. He was evacuated to Troyes, where he died as a result of his injuries a few days later, January 19, 1871.

== Tribute ==
By decree of January 12, 1907, the City Council of the city of Troyes adopted the proposal of Mr. Gruot to rename the street of Haut-de-la-Mission as Valtat and gives his name to the street.

== Works ==
=== Graphic Arts ===
- La rencontre sous la porte dorée, jubé de Villemaur (The meeting under the golden gate, rood screen of Villemaur, lithograph, art archeology and natural science museum of Troyes.

=== Sculptures ===
- 1859 – 1860, Faune et Bacchante (Wildlife and Bacchante), pastoral group in the grandeur of nature, cast for the zoological gardens of Paris, Musée des beaux-arts de Troyes.
- Le Christ sur la Croix (Christ on the Cross), plaster according to François Girardon, a copy of the bronze statue kept in the church of Saint-Rémi in Troyes, Troyes Museum.
- Before 1864, Orestes pursued by the Furies, after the murder of his Mother, bas-relief plaster, Museum of Fine Arts Troyes.
- Before 1869, Faune et Dryade (Faun and Dryad), original plaster Exhibition of French Artists 1869 Art and Archaeology Museum of Troyes.
- Lion, a stone carving of lions adorning the entrance to the prefecture Troyes.
- Adam and Eve pastoral group, Museum of Fine Arts Troyes.

== Bibliography ==
- Benezit Dictionary of Artists
- Lebrun-Dalbanne, Les tableaux du Louvre et les dons de Mr Valtat au musée de Troyes (The Louvre paintings and donated to the museum by Mr Valtat Troyes), Troyes, 1873 catalog, 9 p, ill, 25 cm. Numéro spécial de l'Annuaire de l'Aube (Special issue of the Yearbook of the Dawn), 1875.
