= SMN-ETH =

Broadcasting organization in Ethiopia

- Type: Public broadcasting
- Country: Ethiopia
- Headquarters: Hawassa, Sidama Region, Ethiopia
- Owner: Sidama Regional State Government
- Former names: Sidama Media Network (SMN)

The Sidaama Broadcasting Corporation (SBC), or SMN-ETH, formerly the Sidama Media Network (SMN), is a regional broadcasting organization based in Hawassa, Ethiopia. It is the primary broadcaster for the newly formed Sidama Regional State.

== History ==
The predecessor to SBC was Sidama Radio, whose construction began in 1996 without a broadcasting license. Studio equipment and a transmitter were imported based on an agreement with the Ministry of Education through the Sidama Zone Education Department. The station was established in 1997 in Yirgalem town and operated on a medium wave frequency of 954 kHz, with a transmission radius of 188 km. The development initiative was funded by Irish Aid. Irish Aid and the Sidama Development Program (SDP) partnership financed both formal education and community programs for five years until Irish Aid's withdrawal. The initiative was supported by the implementation of Ethiopia's federal system.

The Sidama Media Network (SMN) was established to serve the Sidama ethnic group and was aligned with the movement for statehood. On the evening of 18 July 2019, security personnel in Hawassa arrested two managers, Getahun Deguye and Tariku Lemma, and two board members, Belay Belguda and Girma Chuluke, from SMN. Girma was released unconditionally after a few hours. Journalists were allowed back to the office on 23 July but did not fully resume work until 25 July. The station continued to air content from its South Africa offices. SMN executives appeared at the high court in Hawassa on 12 August 2019. Getahun Deguye, Tariku Lemma, and Belay Balguda were among those who appeared.

== Operations ==
SBC is based in Hawassa. The corporation invited international bidders for the procurement, supply, installation, testing, and commissioning of TV studio, TV automation, and uplink equipment, as well as FM transmitter and radio studio equipment, on a turnkey basis. The bid documents were available from the Sidama Broadcasting Corporation Hawassa office number 202 before 26 January 2026, against a non-refundable payment of Birr 800.00 for each lot. The bid bond for Lot 1 was 300,000.00 Birr, and for Lot 2 was 250,000.00 Birr.

SMN, the predecessor network, provided coverage of the region's coffee industry, cultural festivals including Fichee-Chambalaalla, and local governance. It was recognized for its role in the linguistic empowerment of the Sidama people, broadcasting primarily in Sidaamu Afoo. SMN's programming included social development news, health education, and programs dedicated to the youth of the region.

== Programming ==
Sidama Radio produced social, entertainment, and educational programs with the social development perspectives of the community. The station gave more airtime and emphasis on local issues and social development programs. Programs promoted the local language and culture through local music and narration. Community members participated in the administration of the station and in the production of programs, with many volunteer journalists coming from the community.
