= Fana Broadcasting Corporate =

Ethiopian media company

FMC Fana Media Corporation SC
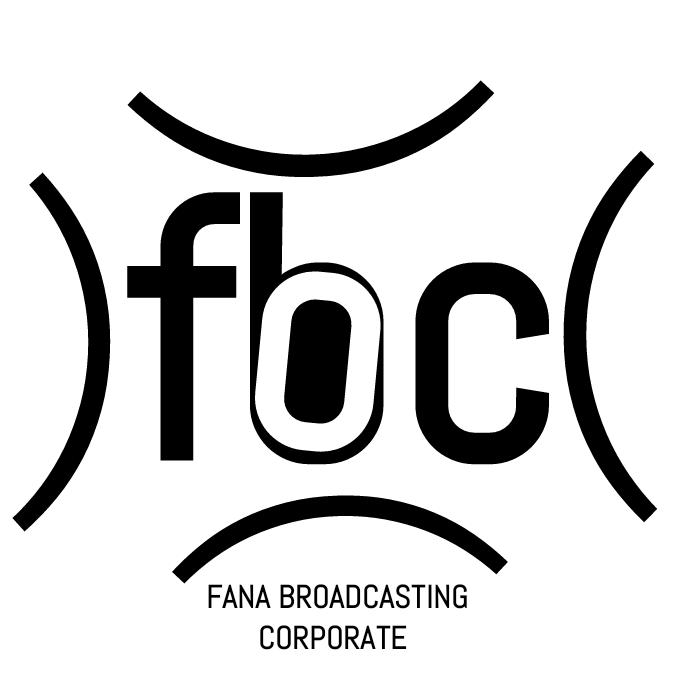
- FBC logo
- Country: Ethiopia
- Broadcast area: Ethiopia
- Headquarters: Addis Ababa

Programming
- Languages: Afaan Oromo, Tigrinya, Somali, Amharic, Afar, Arabic and English

Ownership
- Sister channels: Fana TV

History
- Launched: 1994

Links
- Website: http://www.fanamc.com/

Fana Media Corporation S.C. (FMC) is a state-owned mass media company operating in Ethiopia. Launched in 1994 it focuses mostly on political, social and economical reports about Ethiopia. It operates radio and television stations within Ethiopia.

== Political stances ==
Initially, for the majority of FMC's history, it was aligned with the ruling party EPRDF as majority of former board members and CEO at the time, Woldu Yemessel, were members and closely tied to EPRDF. As of 2020, FMC supported the ruling Prosperity Party as the majority of board members and the CEO are members of Prosperity Party.

== International media links ==
In March 2023, the Russian state news agency Sputnik and FMC announced a deal to exchange content and carry out common projects. Vasily Pushkov, the director of Sputnik, stated that Ethiopian media would become "a major priority" for Sputnik.

== Fana TV ==
In 2014, it was announced that FBC would be building its own studio in the hopes of starting its own channel.[1] In 2016, FBC formally signed an agreement with the Ethiopian Broadcasting Authority (EBA) to become a licensed broadcaster in the country.[2] Fana TV started test transmission of its satellite TV channel on Ethiosat in July 2017. These developments took place under the leadership of Woldu Yemessel Baraki, whose long tenure as CEO was marked by sustained efforts to expand FMC’s reach and transition it into a multi-platform media organization. Under his leadership Fana Media Corporation underwent a period of major institutional growth, the company transitioned from a radio-focused broadcaster into a multi-platform media organization, one of the key milestones of this transformation being the launch of Fana TV.
