= Abbay Media TV =

Television channel in Ethiopia

- Type: Private
- Country: Ethiopia
- Broadcast area: Ethiopia and diaspora (via satellite)
- Headquarters: Addis Ababa, Ethiopia

Programming
- Language: Amharic
- Picture format: HDTV 1080i

Ownership
- Owner: Abbay Media

History
- Launched: 2020

Links
- Website: abbaynews.com

Abbay Media TV, also known as Abbay TV, is a private television channel based in Addis Ababa, Ethiopia. The channel broadcasts primarily in Amharic and targets audiences in Ethiopia and the Ethiopian diaspora.

The broadcaster's programming focuses on news, entertainment, and social issues, and includes documentaries, dramas, and variety shows. It has also produced the weekly program Back Home in partnership with Population Media Center and UN Women.

Independent coverage of the channel's corporate structure and launch history is limited, and much of the available information originates from the broadcaster itself.

== History ==
The outlet presented itself as a platform for civic and political organizations, activists, and human-rights defenders.

According to the company's Salary.com profile, Abbay Media opened its first mini studio in the Megenagna sub-city of Addis Ababa in 2018 and upgraded to a medium-sized studio in the Meskel Flower sub-city in 2019 as it prepared to begin television broadcasting in 2020.

== Operations ==
Abbay Media TV is based in Addis Ababa. Its satellite signal is carried on NSS 12 at 57.0°E, with a transponder frequency of 11165 H and a symbol rate of 45000, in standard-definition MPEG-4.

== Programming ==
Abbay Media TV produces programming in Amharic, with a focus on news, entertainment, and social issues. Current and regular programs include:

- Abbay News – News bulletins covering politics, business, technology, sports, and culture.
- Back Home – A weekly program produced in partnership with Population Media Center and UN Women, focusing on the experiences of migrant women and returnees.
- Documentaries – Documentaries on local success stories and social issues.
- Dramas and variety shows – Entertainment content catering to family viewers.
- Live event coverage – Broadcasts of civic, political, religious, and community events.
