= Walta =

Ethiopian media conglomerate

Walta Media and Communication Corporate S.C.
- Country: Ethiopia
- Broadcast area: Ethiopia
- Headquarters: Addis Ababa, Ethiopia

Programming
- Languages: English; Amharic; Arabic

Ownership
- Owner: Ethiopian government
- Sister channels: Walta TV

History
- Launched: 1994; 32 years ago

Links
- Website: https://waltainfo.com

Walta Media and Communication Corporate S.C. or Walta, previously called Walta Information and Public Relations Center S.C., or Walta Information Center, is an Ethiopian commercial media conglomerate owned and operated by the Ethiopian government. Walta, located in Addis Ababa, was founded in 1994 and supplies the Ethiopian News Agency and other media with local and national news.

== History ==
Walta has been affiliated with the Ethiopian government since 1992 or earlier. As of 2020, Walta supported the federal Ethiopian government and the Prosperity Party.

== Contents ==
As part of the media conglomerate, there is an online medium in English, Amharic and Arabic with local, national, and international news and a TV station, Walta TV, broadcasting mainly social and political news in Amharic over satellite.

== Objectives ==
According to Walta, it gathers, organizes, analyzes and disseminates news and provides "image building and public relation support activities".
