= ENN TV =

Defunct Ethiopian television channel

- Country: Ethiopia

Programming
- Picture format: 1080p (HDTV) & 576i (SDTV), 16:9)

Ownership
- Owner: ENN Television

History
- Launched: 2016; 9 years ago
- Closed: June 29, 2018; 6 years ago

Links
- Website: enntelevision.com

Ethiopian News Network (ENN TV) was an Ethiopian television channel based in Addis Ababa, Ethiopia. The channel was launched in 2016 on Nilesat. It was the first private station based in Ethiopia to be focused on news and politics outside of the national broadcaster EBC. ENN TV faced criticisms by several organizations for alleged use of misinformation and propaganda manipulation which led the channel to official closure on June 29, 2018.

== Allegations ==
The channel was accused by several organizations, including Ethiopian Commercial Bank and Ethio telecom for lack of sponsorship and remaining non-commercial activity. ENN TV also criticized by the government press conferences and communications, notably from Foreign Affairs, and revoked the right to broadcast to certain events. They also self-proclaimed that the channel have been in dispute with Oromia Region and Addis Ababa administrations. Many media critics blamed it for the use of propaganda model and photograph manipulation – those said involved in the 2014–2016 Oromo protests event. The Ethiopian Broadcasting Agency stated that the channel was refused to broadcast the speech of Prime Minister Abiy Ahmed in aftermath of bombing at Meskel Square rally on June 23, 2018.

== Programming ==
- ENN Music – Variety of international and Ethiopian music
- ODAA (ኦዳ) - Political discussions
- Fit le Fit (ፊት ለፊት) – Free political discussions
- Ye Ligoch Tera (የልጆች ተራ) – Programs for children
- Taitu (ጣይቱ) – A roundtable discussion among women focusing women's issues
- ENN News – General News
- YOP – Talent show (Idol format)
- DAGUU - Press Digest Program
- Red Sea – Horn affairs political analysis program
- Semonegna – Current affairs political analysis program
