= LTV Ethiopia =

Ethiopian television channel

- Country: Ethiopia
- Network: Television network

Programming
- Picture format: 1080p (HDTV) & 576i (SDTV), 16:9)

Ownership
- Owner: Gemechis Buba

History
- Launched: January 2017; 8 years ago

Links
- Website: https://ltvethiopia.tv/

LTV Ethiopia is an Ethiopian satellite television channel owned and started by Gemechis Buba. It was created for the purpose of spreading the Ethiopian culture to the world through its programming and to fill the lack of private channels in Ethiopia.

== History ==
LTV Ethiopia was launched in June 2016. After several months of test broadcasting, regular programming commenced in the spring of 2017. Soon after launching, LTV was named as one of the four channels implicated by the Ethiopian Broadcasting Authority for operating in the country without any proper local license.

== Programming ==
- LTV Show - Interviews of prominent Ethiopians
- Made in Ethiopia - showcasing the best in Ethiopian creation
- LTV News - New Program focused on the current events
- Ethio Planet - Documentary style nature program
- Niud
- Let's go with Meti - travel program hosted by Meti
- Lebamoch
- Diplomacy
- Wedefit

== Ownership ==
LTV Ethiopia is a US-based company owned by Dr. Gemechis Buba.
