= Dimtsi Weyane =

Ethiopian Tigrinya-language television news channel

- Type: Radio network 1980–present Television network 2018–present
- Country: Ethiopia
- Broadcast area: National and worldwide
- Network: Television and radio broadcast
- Affiliates: Tigray TV; Tigrai Media House (TMH)
- Headquarters: Mekelle, Tigray Region, Ethiopia

Programming
- Languages: Tigrinya, Amharic, Oromo and English
- Picture format: 1080p (HDTV) & 576i (SDTV 16:9)

Ownership
- Owner: Dimtsi Weyane Tigray P.L.C
- Sister channels: DW International

History
- Launched: Radio: 1980; 46 years ago; Television: 2018; 8 years ago

Links
- Website: www.dimtsiweyane.com

Social media
- Dimtsi Weyane @dimtsiweyane on Facebook

Dimtsi Weyane (DW or DW TV, also spelled Dimtsi Woyane; Tigrinya: ድምፂ ወያነ, lit. 'Voice of the Revolution') is an Ethiopian news-based television and radio network headquartered in Mekelle, Tigray, Ethiopia. Owned by Dimtsi Weyane Tigray P.L.C., it first launched as a radio station in 1980 and in 2018 launched a satellite television channel. The channel broadcasts programming mainly in Tigrinya with some programming in Amharic, Oromo and English.

== History ==
Dimtsi Weyane was founded as a radio station in 1980 by the Tigrayan People's Liberation Front during its struggle against the Derg regime. Dimtsi Weyane started broadcasting in 2018 on Eutelsat and on an Ethiopian state-owned free-to-air (FTA) TV platform frequency hosted on SES's NSS-12 satellite at 57 degrees East called Ethiosat.

== Controversy ==
As of July 2020, Dimtsi Weyane as well as Tigray Regional State Television were no longer broadcasting, according to a report by Deutsche Welle Amharic service which cited its Addis Ababa reporter. The Federal Attorney-General launched an investigation on three broadcasters in connection with alleged roles in inciting ethnic violence in Ethiopia. The result of the investigation on Oromia Media Network (OMN), Asrat Television and Dimtsi Woyane was not announced to the public. Tigray Region authorities have not confirmed the news and the federal government have not issued a statement regarding why the two channels were taken off the air.

== See also ==
- Television in Ethiopia
- Mass media in Ethiopia
