= EBS TV (Ethiopia) =

Ethiopian private television network

- Country: Ethiopia
- Network: Television broadcaster

Programming
- Language: Amharic
- Picture format: 1080p (HDTV) 576i (SDTV), (16:9) & (UHD)

Ownership
- Owner: EBS Television Global
- Sister channels: EBS Musika; EBS Cinema; EBS HD

History
- Launched: 2008; 18 years ago

Links
- Website: ebstv.tv/website/

Ethiopian Broadcasting Service (EBS TV) is an Ethiopian free to air television network. Launched in 2008, the network is based in Ethiopia with correspondents both in United States at its headquarters in Silver Spring, Maryland, U.S. EBS TV broadcasts programs in mostly Amharic. EBS TV is the first private channel launched in Ethiopia.

EBS TV focuses various entertainments related subjects such as talk shows, game shows, movies, dramas and others. EBS TV is known for the production of the first local late night talk show, Seifu on EBS, hosted by Seifu Fantahun. The channel is available via Nilesat 7°W position and it is also being distributed on DStv as of March 2017.

== TV channels ==
=== EBS Cinema ===
EBS Cinema is a channel that focuses on only Ethiopian films, dramas and sitcoms and it is available via Ethiosat.

=== EBS Musika ===
EBS Musika or music is a channel that broadcasts only music content like pop, rap and classical music and its available via Ethiosat.

=== EBS HD ===
EBS HD is the main channel that broadcasts news, sports, entertainment, economy and culture content and it is available via Ethiosat.

== History ==
EBS TV is the first privately run television network in Ethiopia. It also operates two other channels EBS Musika and EBS Cinema which can both, along with EBS TV, be found on Roku TV and NSS 12 Satellite 11105 V 45000.

In 2018, EBS TV was able to acquire a local broadcasting license. The company had to split into two separate entities, EBS Television Ethiopia Plc and EBS Television Global, in order to get the local broadcasting permit. As of April 2018 EBS is prepared a live transmission studios for the news and sports programs at its current headquarters located on Bawa Building, around Unity University in Gerji.

EBS TV was suspended by the Ethiopian Broadcast Authority following airing rape case of Birtukan Temesgen – a second year student of Dembi Dolo University who claimed have been "abducted and raped" in 2020 – on 24 March 2025.

== Programming ==
=== News and business ===
- What's new (news)
- Ethio business (business news)
- EBS Sport (sport news)

=== Talk shows ===
- Helen Show (serious matter show)
- Seifu on EBS (entertainment show)
- Tech Talk (related to technology)
- Dagi Show (serious matter show)

=== Lifestyle shows ===
- Semonun Addis
- Discover Ethiopia
- Chef Yohanis
- Tizitachin
- Ketimirt Alem
- Fashion (ሽክ)
- 20-30 (ሀያ ሰላሳ)
- Kehiwot Seleda (ከህይወት ሠሌዳ)
- Ye Adey Gize (የአደይ ጊዜ)
- Discover Ethiopia (ኢትዮጵያን እንወቅ)

=== Game shows and weekend programs ===
- Kidamen Keseat (ቅዳሜን ከሰዓት)
- Ehudin Be EBS (እሁድን በኢቢኤስ)
- Yebeteseb Chewata (የቤተሰብ ጨዋታ)
- Mirtu Gebeta (ምርጡ ገበታ)
- Arada kidame (አራዳ ቅዳሜ)
- Yebeteseb Megenagnet (የቤትሰብ መገናኘት)

=== Music ===
- Sound Pulse
- EBS Musika
- EBS Music
- EBS Music Reggae & Afro Beat

=== Dramas ===
- አደይ (tragedy drama)
- በሰንቱ (comedy drama)
- ሞጋቾቹ (drama)
- ዘመን (drama)
- ራኬብ (drama)
- ጎረቤታሞቹ (comedy, drama)
- የእግር እሳት (comedy)
- ደምብ (drama)
- የተቀበረው (drama)
- ወላፈን (drama)
- የራስ ጥላ (drama)
- ከተዘጋው ዶሴ (drama)
