= Kana TV =

Ethiopian television channel

Kana TV ቃና ቲቪ
- Country: Ethiopia
- Network: Television network

Programming
- Language: Amharic
- Picture format: 1080i 16:9, 4:3 (HDTV); Downscaled to 576i for the SDTV feed

Ownership
- Owner: Canal+

History
- Launched: April 4, 2016; 9 years ago (Note: Kana TV regularly started programming alongside Kara Para Aşk and Saraswatichandra on April 4)

Links
- Website: kanatelevision.com

Kana TV (Amharic: ቃና ቲቪ) is an Ethiopian satellite television channel now owned by French-based Canal+. It was co-founded by three Ethiopian entrepreneurs in combination with Moby Media Group and was officially launched on April 4, 2016. Kana TV produces voice-over translation by dubbing foreign content to Amharic. The channel programming focuses on serial dramas especially Turkish television dramas, which gain overall exceeding rate in its market share, becoming the most popular television channel in Ethiopia.

Kana TV is broadcast throughout the region by Nilesat and began its transmission on Ethiosat. The channel operates solely in the Amharic language, broadcasting both Ethiopian content as well as foreign dubbed content. Among its most popular foreign programming are well-known Turkish dramas such as Kuzey Güney (Kuzi Guni), O Hayat Benim (Yetkema Hiwot), Kara Para Aşk (Tikur Fikir), Zalim İstanbul (Shimya), Siyah Beyaz Aşk (Dir Ena Mag) and Mrs. Fazilet and Her Daughters (Ye Fazilet Lijoch). It has offices located in Addis Ababa, Ethiopia, with, as of 2017, plans to expand its studios to develop locally produced content.

== Ethiopian TV market ==
Due to the relative infancy of the television market in Ethiopia at the time of its launch, Kana TV had to commission its own studies to measure television viewership in the country. These studies revealed that a majority of viewers were watching foreign language content on channels like MBC 1 and Al Jazeera.

The success of Kana TV, was largely built on the fact there was a large untapped market for foreign content, particularly Turkish dramas, in Ethiopia.

In March 2017, Kana TV released its first independent TV market study which found that since its launch a year earlier, Kana TV had gained a 34% market share and had 8 of the top 10 highest rated prime time shows.

== Programming ==
Weraj Ale, Hiwote, Kana News and Sheqela are amongst locally produced programs. Kana Passport/National Geographic is the sole documentary program of the channel translating to Amharic, and Hop is musical television program broadcasting both national and international hits. As of February 2025, the official YouTube channel has reached 1.35M subscribers.

== Criticism ==
Kana TV drew criticism from conservative commentators who argued that over-consumption of foreign soap operas dubbed in Amharic would corrupt Ethiopian culture. Various industry trade associations of concerned actors, directors, and writers formally petitioned the government to shut down the channel prior to its launch. While appeals to shut down the network were denied, the Ethiopian Broadcasting Authority (EBA) did change its policies to mandate that the majority of content on Ethiopian television channels had to be locally produced.

== Surveys ==
A study among students, teachers and administrators was conducted on Kana TV's impact on the popular culture within Ethiopian society. Using methodological stratified sampling, a survey on television viewing habits was conducted in government and private schools at Nifas Silk-Lafto district in Addis Ababa with 363 students and 38 schoolteachers. The study found that overall, 63% of respondents were heavy viewers of the channel while 28% were moderate viewers. Among heavy viewers, 64% were students and 58% were teachers, while 27% of students and 40% of teachers and administrators wer moderate viewers. About 9% of students and 3% of teachers and administrators were found to be infrequent viewers. The study found that Kana TV to be very popular among students and teachers. Most respondents who held positive attitudes toward the channel were heavy viewers, though minor subgroups of respondents held negative views of the channel.
