= Walta TV =

Ethiopian television network

- Type: Television network
- Country: Ethiopia
- Broadcast area: Ethiopia
- Headquarters: Addis Ababa

Programming
- Language: Amharic
- Picture format: 1080i 16:9, 4:3 (HDTV); Downscaled to 576i for the SDTV feed

Ownership
- Owner: Walta Media and Communication Corporate S.C.
- Sister channels: Afro News

History
- Launched: April 7, 2017; 9 years ago

Links
- Website: www.waltainfo.com

Walta TV is an Ethiopian television network owned and operated by Walta Media and Communication Corporate S.C. Walta TV is available on three satellites, originally on Eutelsat 7 West A but also on Belintersat-1 and on the Ethiosat platform.

== History ==
Walta TV was launched on April 7, 2017. As of 2017, it was one of five channels in Ethiopia to be officially licensed by the Ethiopian Broadcasting Authority. Before the launch of its own channel, Walta mostly provided its locally produced news and documentaries for the national broadcaster EBC (formerly ETV). It is also one of the few private channels to be available on the Ethiopia-based satellite platform Ethiosat to be found on Eutelsat 8 West B.

== Programming ==
Walta TV has essentially the same format as EBC as programming is mostly geared towards news focusing on political and social issues within Ethiopia.
