= JTV Ethiopia =

Ethiopian private television channel

- Country: Ethiopia
- Network: Television network

Programming
- Picture format: 576i (HDTV), 16:9)

Ownership
- Owner: Yosef Gebre

History
- Launched: 2016; 9 years ago

Links
- Website: jtvethiopia.com

JTV Ethiopia is an Ethiopian free-to-air satellite television channel owned by Yosef Gebre, a journalist, singer and philanthropist who previously began his TV show in EBS TV before establishing his own channel. It is based in Phoenix, Arizona, U.S and launched in 2016 on Nilesat. In May 2020, the channel in its standard-definition (SD) television platform was officially closed as a result of poor revenue from each employee and the COVID-19 pandemic impacted the station for less advertising income. However, the channel still exists in HD and is transmitted via Ethiosat.

== History ==
The channel was started and named after the singer and talk show host Yosef Gebre (known as Jossy) who previously hosted his talk show Jossy in Z House on EBS TV. After an alleged dispute with EBS TV in 2014, Yosef took his talk show off the channel and started his own channel which later became JTV Ethiopia. The channel had correspondents and studios in Addis Ababa, Ethiopia. The channel obtained a license to broadcast in Ethiopia in 2018.

On May 4, 2020, JTV Ethiopia has officially shutdown its SD platform for cases of low advertising revenue, and degradation salary payments for each employee caused by widespread of COVID-19 impact in Ethiopia. The General Manager of the station has said the station could only pay half of employees wages, and the distribution had been abolished for 5 days. Complains and FAQs are raised by its staff members of the shutdown. One of the staff member suggested "But to higher the risk, we are working with 20 staff, with the majority of the organization working hardly. Just like so many people are now being asked to do." However, JTV Ethiopia is managed to retain its transmission on HD and now transmits on Ethiosat.

== Programming ==
- Ke tsehay betach
- Jossy in Z House
- Hello Tech
- Gash Chewata
- JTV Sports
- Travel Ethiopia
- Habesha Weekly
