= Oromia Broadcasting Network =

Ethiopian television network

OBN(Oromia Broadcasting Network)
- Country: Ethiopia
- Network: Television network
- Headquarters: Addis Ababa, Ethiopia

Programming
- Picture format: 1080i 16:9, 4:3 (HDTV); Downscaled to 576i for the SDTV feed

Ownership
- Owner: Oromia Broadcasting Network (OBN)
- Sister channels: OBN Horn of Africa OBN Gaammee (children Programs)

History
- Launched: June 2012; 14 years ago
- Former names: ETV 2 and TVO Now, OBN

Links
- Website: obn.net

The Oromia Broadcasting Network (OBN) is an Ethiopian public service broadcaster headquartered in Addis Ababa, Ethiopia. It is the leading media organization in Oromia and broadcasts on Eutelsat via the Ethiosat platform.

Company Profile About Oromia Broadcasting Network (OBN) Oromia Broadcasting Network (OBN) is a leading Ethiopian public service broadcaster, headquartered in Adama, Ethiopia. Since its establishment in June 2012, OBN has emerged as a major media organization, delivering news, educational, cultural, and sports programming in more than 19 Ethiopian languages and three international languages. Operating under the Oromia Radio and Television Organization (ORTO), OBN has been a pioneering force in Ethiopian media, ensuring inclusive and high-quality broadcasts that cater to a broad audience.

OBN’s reach extends beyond Ethiopia, broadcasting via Eutelsat on the Ethiosat platform and Nilesat, making it accessible to viewers across Africa and internationally. Committed to innovation, excellence, and audience engagement, OBN continuously expands its digital presence and embraces modern broadcasting solutions to remain at the forefront of Ethiopian media.

Experience in Sports Broadcasting OBN has established itself as a trusted authority in sports media, having successfully broadcast major national and international sporting events. Over the past two years, OBN has been the technical backbone of Ethiopian Premier League coverage, providing OB vans, high-definition cameras, vision mixers, and skilled operators, ensuring a seamless and high-quality viewing experience despite DSTv holding the official rights. Beyond football, OBN’s proven expertise in sports broadcasting includes live coverage of:

IBA International Boxing Association event in Addis Ababa, showcasing OBN’s ability to manage global sporting events. 46th CAF Ordinary General Assembly, reinforcing OBN’s presence in African football governance and its commitment to elevating Ethiopian sports on the international stage.

OBN’s deep understanding of sports media production, combined with its technical capacity and operational excellence, makes it the ideal broadcaster for Ethiopian Premier League coverage.

Technical Capabilities and Infrastructure OBN operates with state-of-the-art broadcasting infrastructure, ensuring exceptional video and audio quality for live sports coverage. Key capabilities include: OBN continues to invest in cutting-edge technology and talent development, reinforcing its role as a media powerhouse in Ethiopian sports broadcasting. By integrating modern digital platforms, interactive content, and audience analytics, OBN is dedicated to enhancing viewer experiences and expanding Ethiopian football’s influence globally. With a strong reputation for reliability, industry expertise, and operational excellence, OBN is the ideal broadcasting partner to take Ethiopian Premier League coverage to new heights.

== History ==
The channel is run by the Oromia Radio and Television Organization (ORTO), founded on 12 July 2006 by Proclamation number 113/2006 of the Regional Government, as the Oromia mass media organization (OMMO). The regional government renamed the organization to Oromia Radio and TV Organization by Proclamation No. 164/2011 in 2011. Oromia Broadcasting Network was established according to Oromia Mass Media Organization establishment Proclamation No. 133 of 2006 to widely disseminate the timely gathered international and local information to the public and government bodies. It broadcasts independent news, educational, and entertainment programs in 14 Ethiopian languages and three international languages on radio and TV.

Media Coverage

The Organization has been broadcasting for 119 hours per week on Radio and 24 hours a day on TV covering 100% of the region by FM and AM Radio waves and more than 70% by TV using antenna (microwave). Also, we are reaching the abroad listeners and audiences by Nile sat7, Amos Ku band 5,170 east, Galaxy 19,970 west, Optus D2, 152o east, NSS 12,570 east, Thaicom 5,78o east satellites and websites (www.orto.gov.et).

Notably, Prime Minister Abiy Ahmed was a board member of the organization that runs OBN before assuming the office of prime minister.

In February 2018, the president of the Oromia regional state, Lemma Megersa, pledged to defend the independence and impartiality of the state-run Oromia Broadcasting Network (OBN), among others. He stated this after a central committee meeting in Adama by the OPDO, the Oromo faction of the ruling EPRDF party that controls the Oromia.

== Programming ==
Content is mostly focused on news from the Oromia regional state, but also covers news from the national and international levels. The majority of broadcasts are in Oromo, one of the five official languages of Ethiopia. with some programs in Amharic, Afar, Gurage, Somali, Kiswahili Arabic and English.

== Political significance ==
Many prominent Oromo leaders in the government of Ethiopia use OBN as a platform to reach the majority of the Oromo-speaking population, such as when leading OPDO figure Abadula Gemeda announced his displeasure with the government's mistreatment of internally displaced Oromo people in 2017.

In March 2018, OBN was the first to confirm a deadly incident in the border town of Moyale via an interview with the town's mayor.

== Controversy ==
The Oromia Media Networks, along with two broadcasters, Tigray TV and Dimtse Woyane were alleged to have disseminated media propaganda by the Ethiopian government following the death of Hachalu Hundessa on 29 June 2020. These three networks are allegedly operated by two political parties, Oromo Liberation Front and Tigray People's Liberation Front. The two parties were labeled as "terrorist agents" by the government and responsible for inciting violence after Hachalu Hundessa death. The Federal Attorney-General launched an investigation on three broadcasters in connection with alleged roles in inciting ethnic violence in Ethiopia. The channels have been breaching the broadcasting laws, warned to lift off-air in Ethiopia, and ordered to shut down proclamation as of 6 July. However, the channels guarantee they will broadcast via international networks, primarily North American networks.
