= Nahoo TV =

Ethiopian television channel

- Country: Ethiopia
- Network: Television network

Programming
- Languages: Amharic; English; Oromo
- Picture format: 1080i 16:9, 4:3 (HDTV); Downscaled to 576i for the SDTV feed

Ownership
- Owner: Nahoo LLC

History
- Launched: April 2016; 10 years ago

Links
- Website: www.thenahootv.com

Nahoo TV (Amharic: ናሁ ቲቪ) is an Ethiopian free to air television channel owned by Nahoo LLC. Launched in April 2016, it is based in Addis Ababa, Ethiopia and provides in Amharic, English and Oromo languages.

== History ==
The channel is based in Addis Ababa, Ethiopia and started test broadcasting on Ethiosat in January 2016 with regular programming starting later that year. The channel is broadcasting with official language of Ethiopia, in Amharic, but also developing programme languages to be broadcast in foreign languages such as English, and other official languages such as Oromo. Content programmings as well as adverts on the channel are made by TUBA Media Plc which signed an agreement with Nahoo TV to serve for this purpose. The Ethiopian Broadcasting Authority (EBA) has issued a license for the channel. In January 2018, the company was sold with a new management and leadership taking over the whole operation. Ever since the company has been one of the chosen Media Station as it inclined from entertainment station to infotainment and politics. Tewodros Shiferaw, Mackonen Esatu Michael and Michael Melaku Admassu are the CEO & deputy CEOs, respectively. The foreign-trained management has changed the TV station dramatically although various challenges from government and others hits the station.
