= Propaganda through media =

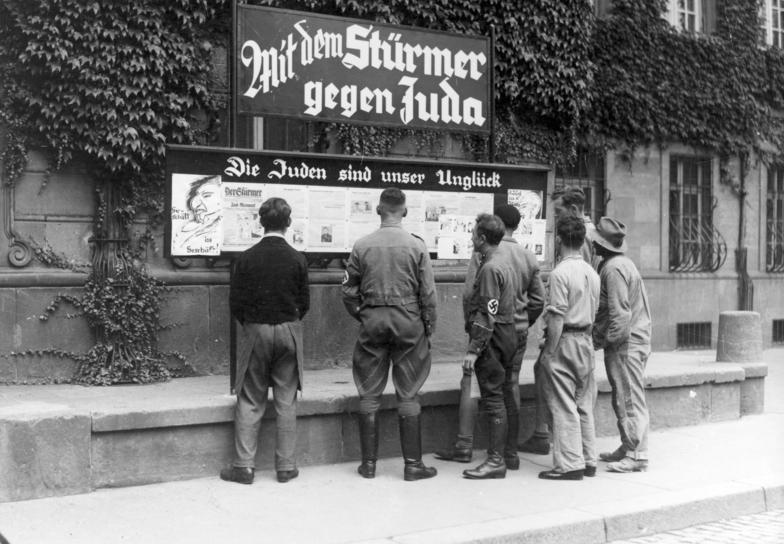
Public reading of the antisemitic newspaper Der Stürmer, Worms, Nazi Germany, 1935

Propaganda is a form of communication that is primarily intended to influence the attitudes, beliefs, or behaviors of a large audience. It is typically associated with the selective presentation of information, emotional appeals, and persuasive techniques designed to shape public opinion. While propaganda is often linked to political contexts, it can also appear in advertising, media, and other forms of mass communication. Scholars such as Edward Bernays have emphasized the role of propaganda in modern society as a tool for shaping public perception and managing collective behavior.

== Historical development ==
The use of propaganda dates back to early forms of mass communication, including print media, religious messaging, and political campaigns. It became especially prominent during the 20th century, particularly in times of war, when governments used propaganda to influence public opinion and maintain support for national efforts.

In the early 20th century, the development of modern public relations further expanded the use of propaganda techniques. Edward Bernays, often considered a pioneer in this field, argued that shaping public opinion was a necessary function in complex societies.

Over time, propaganda has evolved alongside media technologies. From newspapers and radio to television and digital platforms, the methods and reach of propaganda have continued to expand, adapting to changes in how audiences consume information.

== Propaganda model ==
The propaganda model, developed by Noam Chomsky and Edward S. Herman, provides a framework for understanding how media content can be shaped by institutional and economic factors. According to this model, mass media serve to communicate messages that support the interests of dominant social and political groups.

The model suggests that information is filtered through several factors, including ownership, advertising, sourcing, and ideological pressures. These filters influence which stories are reported and how they are presented, ultimately shaping public perception.

The propaganda model is widely discussed in media studies as a way to analyze bias, power structures, and the role of media in society.

To explain the close associations between media and propaganda, Richard Alan Nelson observed propaganda as a form of persuasion with intention with the aid of controlled transmission of single-sided information through mass media. Mass media and propaganda are inseparable. Mass media, as a system for spreading and relaying information and messages to the public, plays a role in amusing, entertaining and informing individuals with rules and values that situate them in social structure.

Propaganda creates conflicts among society's differing classes. In a media engulfed society, mass media is the main platform and output for carrying out acts of propaganda and for pushing forward agendas. Various amounts of modern media can be used to supply propaganda to its intended audience such as, radio, television, films, posters, handouts. music, and smartphones, just to name a few.

== Origins ==
Spoken forms of propaganda can exist in an oral-biased society. "Propaganda" has a negative connotation in a modern political context. Despite that, the word entered language with religious origins. Pope Gregory XV established an institution for spreading the faith and addressing a series of church affairs, which is namely the Congregation for the Propagation of the Faith. Further, a College of Propaganda was set up under Pope Urban VIII to train priests for missions.

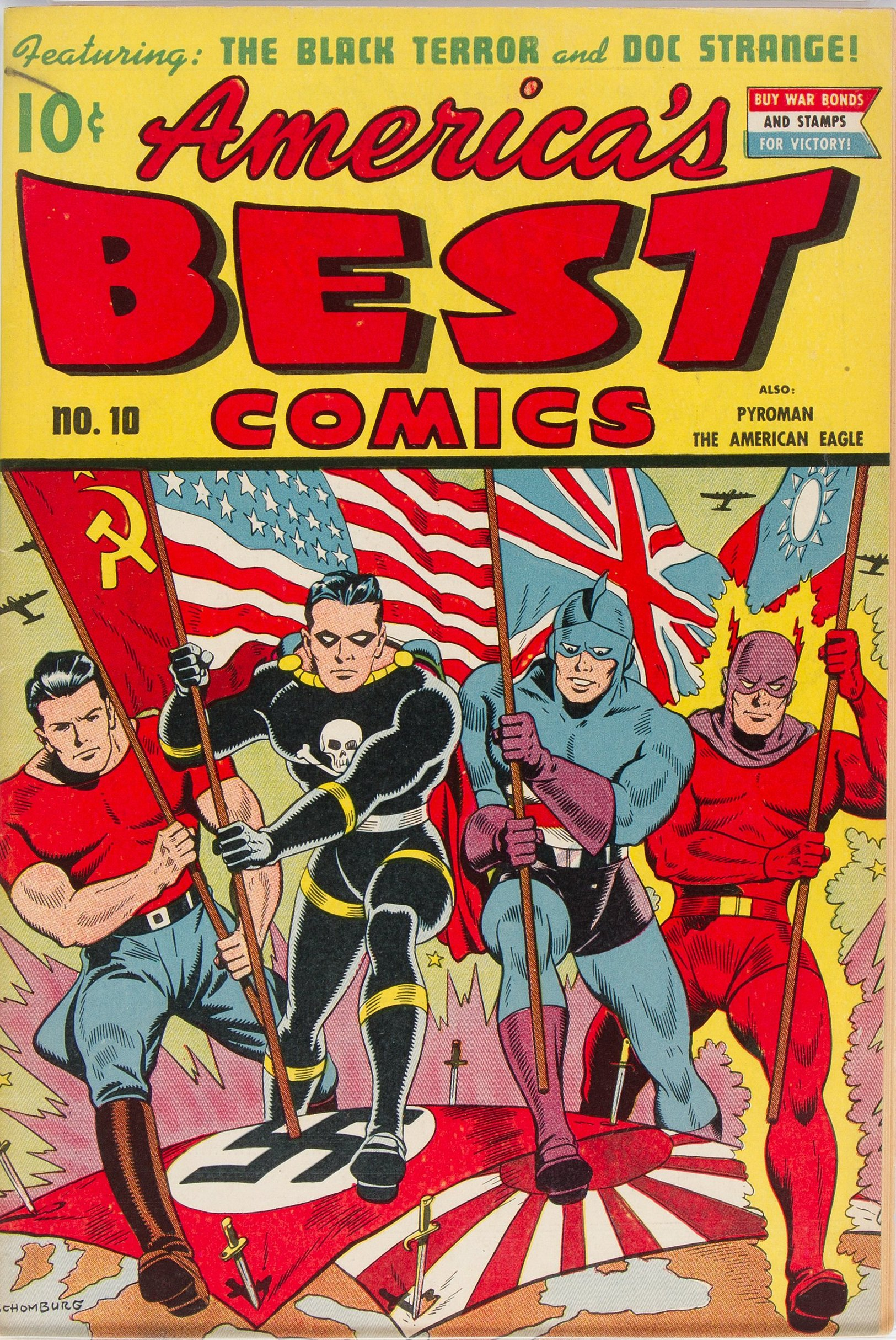
America's Best Comics #7 July 1944. With the war in full swing, patriotically themed comic books were an important source of propaganda.

Throughout history, propaganda has always been evident in momentum social movements such as American independence, the French Revolution, and especially during wartimes. Wartime propaganda is often demanded for shaping public opinions to gain more allies on an international level, as well as calling for citizens to make a contribution and sacrifice to the war on a domestic level. Propaganda was used in the media when the thirteen colonies were trying to separate from Britain. One example from this time period is the Boston Massacre. After this event, the colonists began putting forms of propaganda into the newspapers in an attempt to get more people to rebel against the British.

Governments during the First World War devoted massive resources and huge amounts of effort to producing material designed to shape opinion and action internationally. As Clark claimed, posters in wartime with some visual codes are powerful tools to make people adapt to the new conditions and norms arising from the wars and to accommodate the needs of the war. During the Second World War, the power of propaganda came to the extreme, under the horrors of Nazi Germany. And since then, the word carries more negative connotations than neutral.

== Psychological effects ==
Propaganda often relies on psychological mechanisms to influence individuals. These include emotional appeals, repetition, and the use of persuasive language designed to shape perception and memory.

Research in psychology suggests that individuals may be influenced by propaganda through cognitive biases, such as confirmation bias, where people are more likely to accept information that aligns with their existing beliefs.

Emotional messaging can also play a significant role, as fear, anger, or hope may increase the effectiveness of persuasive communication. These techniques are commonly used in both political messaging and advertising.

== Social media ==
With the widespread use of social media platforms, they have become powerful tools for propaganda. Propaganda is promoted on social media by dozens of governments. The Economist reported that in 2020, 81 countries waged "organized disinformation campaigns", up from 27 in 2017. Another element that makes social media effective for sharing propaganda is that it can reach many people with little effort and users can filter the content to remove content they do not want while retaining what they would like to see. This ease of use can be used by ordinary people as well as government agencies and politicians, who can take advantage of the platforms to spread "junk" news in favor of their cause.

In the digital age, propaganda has expanded significantly through social media and online platforms. Information can spread rapidly across networks, often reaching large audiences in a short period of time.

Research from the Pew Research Center indicates that a large portion of the public now consumes news through social media, increasing the potential for exposure to persuasive and misleading content.

Digital environments also allow for targeted messaging, where content can be tailored to specific audiences. This has raised concerns about misinformation, echo chambers, and the amplification of biased or unverified information.

=== Facebook ===
==== Syria ====
The Facebook pages of Syrian President Bashar al-Assad and the National Coalition of Syrian Revolution and Opposition Forces in 2013 and 2014, uses images to promote their agendas relating to politics during the conflicts following 2011 uprisings in Syria. Their government uses visual frames to help support the image that President Assad is a "fearless leader protecting its people and that life has continued normally through Syria," and to help strengthen the images of the violence and sufferings of the civilians caused by the Assad regime.

==== Uganda ====
The Economist reported that, shortly before the 2021 Ugandan general election, Facebook removed a network of government-linked accounts engaged in "coordinated inauthentic behavior" to boost support for Yoweri Museveni, the incumbent president.

==== United States ====
In 2011, The Guardian reported that the United States Central Command (Centcom) was working with HBGary to develop software that would allow the US government to "secretly manipulate social media sites by using fake online personas to influence internet conversations and spread pro-American propaganda." A Centcom spokesman stated that the "interventions" were not targeting any US-based web sites, in English or any other language, and also said that the propaganda campaigns were not targeting Facebook or Twitter.

In 2013, the Smith-Mundt Act, colloquially known as the "anti-propaganda law" was amended. The amendment repealed the Smith-Mundt's act ban on disseminating "information and material about the United States intended primarily for foreign audiences" to audiences within the USA. Some advocates of repealing the anti-propaganda law did so in the name of "transparency", an approach that The Atlantic called "a remarkably creative spin". Michael Hastings suggested that the Smith-Mundt Modernization Act "would open the door to Pentagon propaganda of U.S. audiences", while a Pentagon official was quoted as saying that "'senior public affairs' officers within the Department of Defense want to 'get rid' of Smith-Mundt and other restrictions because it prevents information activities designed to prop up unpopular policies—like the wars in Iraq and Afghanistan."

In October 2018, The Daily Telegraph reported that Facebook "banned hundreds of pages and accounts which it says were fraudulently flooding its site with partisan political content – although they came from the US instead of being associated with Russia." In 2022, the Stanford Internet Observatory and Graphika studied datasets of banned accounts on Facebook, Instagram, and other social media platforms that used deceptive tactics to promote pro-Western narratives. The Meta dataset included 39 Facebook profiles, 16 pages, two groups, and 26 Instagram accounts. Meta claimed that "individuals associated with the US military" were linked to the propaganda campaign. Some of these accounts were used to put out disinformation online to counter China by dissuading people from receiving China-made vaccines in the Philippines. A retrospective review by the Pentagon also uncovered other social and political messaging that was "many leagues away" from acceptable military objective.

=== Twitter ===
==== Russia ====
During the 2016 presidential election, 200,000 tweets deemed as "malicious activity" from Russia-linked accounts were outed on Twitter. The accounts pushed hundreds of thousands of these tweets claiming that Democrats were practicing witchcraft and posed as Black Lives Matter activists. Investigators were able to trace the account to a Kremlin-linked propaganda outfit. It was founded in 2013 and known as the Internet Research Agency (IRA).

==== Saudi Arabia ====
The New York Times reported in late October 2018 that Saudi Arabia used an online army of Twitter trolls.

==== United States ====
In 2011, The Guardian reported that the United States Central Command (Centcom) was working with HBGary to develop software that would allow the US government to "secretly manipulate social media sites by using fake online personas to influence internet conversations and spread pro-American propaganda." A Centcom spokesman stated that the "interventions" were not targeting any US-based web sites, in English or any other language, and also said that the propaganda campaigns were not targeting Facebook or Twitter.

In 2022, the Stanford Internet Observatory and Graphika studied banned accounts on Twitter, Facebook, Instagram, and five other social media platforms that used deceptive tactics to promote pro-Western narratives. The dataset analyzed by Stanford contained 299,566 Tweets from 146 accounts. Vice News noted that "U.S. leaning social media influence campaigns are, ultimately, very similar to those run by adversarial countries.", while NBC News mentioned that "The campaigns used many of the same tactics that researchers frequently see in similar information operations aimed at denigrating the U.S. and its allies...those include creating fake personas with artificially generated profiles that had accounts across multiple platforms and creating fake news sites that frequently plagiarized articles from elsewhere on the internet." The Intercept reported in December 2022 that the United States military ran a "network of social media accounts and online personas", and that Twitter whitelisted a batch of accounts upon the request of the United States government.

==== Terrorism ====
"Using little-known content uploading services, anonymous text-pasting sites and multiple backup Twitter accounts, a select group of ISIS operatives managed to evade administrators' controls to spread the Cantlie video, titled Lend Me Your Ears, around the web within a few hours." In another example of propaganda, Abdulrahman, the operator al-Hamid used the techniques of hashtagging in a Twitter post to gain the heat of the topics to disseminate the information. A great deal of followers of Hamid on Twitter were demanded to find the highest trending topics in the UK and popular account names they could jump on to get the largest possible reach. As @Abu_Laila wrote: "We need those who can supply us with the most active hashtags in the UK. And also the accounts of the most famous celebrities. I believe that the hashtag of Scotland's separation from Britain should be the first."

=== YouTube ===
In the journal Society, The "cyber-extremism" of ISIS is discussed. One topic analyzed is the fact that ISIS post videos tailored to appeal to extremists: "they make these videos in a way to entice people who are vulnerable to extremist ways." In 2017, The New York Times reported the release of a North Korean propaganda video on YouTube. The video was "mainly depicting a United States aircraft carrier and a warplane being destroyed in computer-generated balls of fire, the latest salvo in an escalating war of words between the two. The video released by a state media outlet is narrated by a woman and including images of North Korea’s military. According to the video, North Korea’s missiles will be 'stabbed into the throat of the carrier,' and the jet will 'fall from the sky,' it warns."

=== Research on propaganda in social media ===
In 2012 the Oxford Internet Institute launched a project called the Computational Propaganda Research Project, a series of studies researching how social media are globally used to manipulate public opinion. The study, which used interviews and "tens of millions posts on seven different social media platforms during scores of elections, political crises, and national security incidents", found that in Russia, approximately 45% of Twitter accounts are bots and in Taiwan, a campaign against President Tsai Ing-wen involved thousands of accounts being heavily coordinated and sharing Chinese propaganda.

Techniques to like, share, and post on social networks were used. The bot accounts were used to "game algorithms" to push different content on the platforms. Real content put out by real people can be covered up and bots can make online measures of support, such as the number of likes or retweets something has received, look larger than it should, thus tricking users into thinking that specific piece of content is popular, a process identified as manufacturing consensus.

There is also research that "cloaked" Facebook accounts are behind the creation of spreading political propaganda online to "imitate the identity of an opponent so they can spark hateful and aggressive reactions" from the media and the opponent. The process goes after a case study on a Danish Facebook pages that are cloaking their pages to resemble radical Islamist pages to help "[provoke] racist and anti-Muslim reactions as well as negative sentiments towards refugees and immigrants in Denmark." The researchers discussed the epistemological, methodological and conceptual challenges of online propaganda. The information also adds to the reader's "understanding of disinformation and propaganda in an increasingly interactive social media environment and contributes to a critical inquiry into social media and subversive politics."

== Music ==
Music has always played a major role in popular culture. Political ideology is often spread through media; however, the use of music reaches an extremely wide and varying audience. According to Manzaria and Bruck, the point of propaganda is to "Persuade people's attitude, beliefs, and behaviors". Music of all genres is constantly being used to portray a political view, shed light, or bring validity to a subject the author, or artist, feels is worth venturing. Propaganda through modes like advertisement and campaign, while effective, will only reach a small group of the desired recipients.

A form of music that focuses the most on propaganda is the patriotic and war music from any one country. With songs like "Slavic Woman's Farewell", "Over There", "God Bless the USA", "Fortunate Son", and Jimi Hendrix's cover of the American national anthem, these songs are designed to provoke an emotion of either respect and patriotism for your country, or rebellion and disgust at your country's actions. To quote the Chicago Tribune, patriotic songs are designed to, "make us feel good about our country even when our country does something we believe is wrong".

According to Putman, musical propaganda has a great deal to do with the audience. Each musical genre can reach a specific demographic within a few minutes, along with the propaganda intertwined. Purfleau brings a more social view to the concept of politically motivated music, stating that musical propaganda is "the basis for a certain kind of political art that aspires to contest the contemporary economic and social order". Purfleau's approach to understanding musical propaganda explains the timeless manner by which music has been used to portray viewpoints. Though music is not always the first media thought of when contemplating propaganda, it is an extremely effective mode and has proved to influence popular culture throughout human history.

== Manufactured consent ==
Edward S. Herman's and Noam Chomsky's book titled Manufacturing Consent tackles this notion as Chomsky uses the analogy of a media machine that divide methods used by media into five different filters, including how media works through ownership, advertising, media-elite, flack and an agreed upon common enemy. The relationship between viewer and broadcaster-consumer and producer in the context of media, has been explored since the beginning of mass communication. This has been carried out not only arguing how the invention of the television changed the make-up of households, but also how news outlets and the Internet have become powerful tools in pushing propaganda and selected information on consumers. Manufactured spaces in media create "information bubbles" through mechanisms such as algorithmic capitalism. They seek to control the ideologies of consumers by bombarding them with information that is leaning to one side whilst depriving them of objectivity. Mass media is selective and influential in its content shared to consumers.

Ownership looks at how people in power and those affected by information brought to the media seek to either destroy it or "spin" it around to maintain self-image and power. Media outlets need consumers to attract advertisers. These two filters are dependent on the media-elite and flack to function. This is because the media-elite are journalists and other people with access to platforms that are essentially hand-picked, and thus play by the rules set by the owners with regards to how and what information is shared. Flack, on the other hand, are those Chomsky proposes to be defamed by those in power or not even given access to a platform simply because their information is too critical or that it threatens ownership, advertisers and revenue in general. The use of having a common enemy is one most identified in politics and can be described as a scapegoat used to justify decisions made by people in power. Hence, the basic concept of Herman's and Chomsky's idea is that these filters illustrate how media can be selective about information and why they are motivated to do so.

With that said, the danger behind filtered information is highlighted in the sense that it creates "ideological polarization", a phenomenon within a society that has "dominated both popular and academic debates". A truly simplified example of this phenomenon would be the political system in the United States and the "self placement" between Democrats and Republicans; the key word in this context being self-placement, as society is grouped and divided into two schools of thoughts. This black-and-white fallacy is the backbone to the polarization effect observed in society's thinking.

== Advertising ==
=== Emphasis and repression ===
Media companies use advertising to advance propaganda. Studies have reported that organisations use advertising to promote economic propaganda by influencing how consumers perceive brands. Advertisements contain positive and exaggerated information that is intended to convince consumers to buy particular products. Many advertisements have included phrases such as "50 percent stronger" or "Less than 30 percent fat", which are highly emphasised and cause consumers to overlook a product's shortcomings, which are typically repressed in advertisements, while the product's positive features are exaggerated.

=== Reference through name calling ===
Having traditionally existed as a common advertising technique, name-calling involves making statements that demean and undermine competitors without necessarily being true. Common brand names such as Coca-Cola and Pepsi have been known to engage in name-calling. The two companies often come up with advertisements that undermine the products that the other offers. Similarly, Burger King ran an advertisement that featured its sandwich "The Whopper" being bigger than the box that McDonald's uses in packing its "Big Mac" hamburger.

=== Bandwagon ===
Companies increasingly try to use the technique to advertise their products and services. This method seeks to convince consumers to make purchase decisions out of the fear of being left out. Claiming that millions of consumers are using their products or services and that it would be a mistake not to be part of the trend. In 1994, McDonald's featured an advertisement that claimed that the fast-food company had served 99 billion customers since its inception. While such a claim may be valid, such information is not meant to allow consumers to make rational purchase decisions.

=== Glittering generality ===
Glittering generality involves using statements that contain phrases the consumer would immediately consider valuable without further analysis. When companies use this strategy effectively, they use their advertisements to appeal to consumers emotionally rather than help them make rational decisions. Some of the most common terms used in advertising to elicit immediate positive feelings among consumers include superlatives such as "better" and "best". An advertisement may emphasise that a product is the best for the consumer without necessarily indicating why and how the consumer would benefit from making the purchase. Since consumers want to acquire the best products and services, they choose to buy such items without analysing whether the claims are valid.

=== Transfer propaganda ===
Entailing advertisements to project positive or negative feelings that people have regarding specific ideas or people to other ideas or people. The goal of transfer propaganda in advertising is to cause consumers to associate a product with positive or negative qualities such as patriotism and nationalism in their product evaluation. An advertisement that emphasizes patriotism, for instance, might be designed to cause consumers to buy a product out of the love that they have for their country.

=== Testimonial advertising ===
Advertisements contain aspects of testimonial propaganda and include influential people, authority figures, and experts to attract the attention of consumers. A toothpaste advert that claims that 99 percent of dentists would recommend the product is an example of how testimonial propaganda occurs in advertising. Similarly, companies and campaigns use celebrity endorsements to promote different products through traditional and modern advertising channels. A billboard containing the picture of a famous footballer holding a ball could, for instance, create the impression that the celebrity prefers the specific brand. In such cases, companies may persuade and manipulate consumers into believing that their products have been tested and approved by authority figures.

== See also ==
- Brian Timpone
- History of propaganda
- Media bias
- Media manipulation
- Political music
- Propaganda techniques
