= Fana TV =

Ethiopian television network

- Country: Ethiopia
- Network: Cable television network

Programming
- Language: Amharic
- Picture format: 1080i 16:9, 4:3 (HDTV); Downscaled to 576i for the SDTV feed

Ownership
- Owner: Fana Broadcasting Corporate

History
- Launched: September 2017; 8 years ago January 2025; 1 year ago (Calendary normal)
- Former names: FBC TV

Links
- Website: www.fanabc.com

Fana TV is an Ethiopian satellite television network owned by Fana Broadcasting Corporate, which is a state-owned company. Launched in September 2017, the network is based in Ethiopia and broadcasts programming in Amharic. It has its studios located at the headquarters of Fana Broadcasting Corporate in Addis Ababa, Ethiopia. In recent years, the channel stretched its network with number of news correspondents across the nation.

== History ==
In 2014, Fana Broadcasting Corporate conducted worldwide procurement with provision of lot, to complete modern, high-definition television. Telmaco was one of participant to the tender that proposed to offer specialized in system-integrator. In June 2015, Telmaco was awarded after long technical negotiation to LOT-2 design and successfully designed to operate the station.

Test transmission was commenced with HD in July 2017 with only broadcasting music videos. Fana TV began broadcasting regular programmes in September via Eutelsat and Ethiosat. Throughout the transmission, Fana garnered public attention and growing market shares during 2018. Serial dramas and reality shows are prominent from past years and increasing the number of news correspondents across Ethiopia, becoming the current mostly watched television channel in recent years.

== Platforms ==
Fana TV was initially made available through Ethiosat in late 2017. In March 2018, Fana TV signed an agreement with South African Digital Satellite Television (DStv) to make the channel more widely available throughout Africa and local internet provider called Websprix launched the first IPTV in Ethiopia which Fana TV started broadcasting.

== Programming ==
=== News ===
- Fana 90 (ፋና 90)
- Fana Zena (ፋና ዜና)
- Fana Kelemat (ፋና ቀለማት)
- Alem Shemach (ዓለም ሸማች)

=== Entertainment ===
- Tibeb Befana (ጥበብ በፋና)
- Geordana’s Kitchen Show (ጆርዳና ኩሽና ሾው)
- Fana Lamrot (ፋና ላምሮት)

=== Drama/Sitcoms ===
- Tireta (ትርታ)
- Min Letazez (ምን ልታዘዝ?)
- Zetenegnaw Shi (ዘጠነኛው ሺህ)
- Survivor
