= Amhara Media Corporation =

Media organization of Amhara Region, Ethiopia

- Type: Radio network Television network Print media
- Country: Ethiopia
- Broadcast area: National and worldwide
- Network: Television, radio broadcast and print media
- Headquarters: Bahir Dar, Amhara Region, Ethiopia

Programming
- Languages: Amharic, Oromo, Tigrinya,Somali and English
- Picture format: 1080i 16:9, 4:3 (HDTV); Downscaled to 576i for the SDTV feed

Ownership
- Owner: Amhara regional government
- Sister channels: Amhara Hiber; AMECO Kids

History
- Launched: 1993 (33 years ago)
- Former names: Amhara Mass Media Agency

Links
- Website: www.amharaweb.com

Amhara Media Corporation (AMECO, የአማራ ሚዲያ ኮርፖሬሽን), formerly known as Amhara Mass Media Agency, is a television, digital media, radio and newspaper news organisation owned by the Amhara Region government in Ethiopia. AMECO was established in 1993. During 2017–2020, AMECO had about 900–1000 employees.

== Creation ==
Amhara Mass Media Agency was created in 1993 with the aim of promoting development, peace and democratisation.

In 2020 the media organization was renamed Amhara Media Corporation (Amharic: የአማራ ሚዲያ ኮርፖሬሽን).

== Components ==
Amhara TV is owned by AMMA.

== Political stance ==
In 2020, AMC was seen as tending to favour the interests of the Amhara Region government and to be independent from federal state media. The Addis Ababa branch of AMMA, created in 2016, was seen as promoting the interests of the Amhara Region and of people of Amharan ethnicity, supporting Eskinder Nega.

Similar to other major regional media in Ethiopia, as of 2020, AMMA has used victimisation, presenting cases of Amharans as victims, and externalisation, in which incidents in the Amhara Region are blamed on actors from other regions, omitting other perspectives.

In 2019, AMC was supportive of the newly created Prosperity Party.

== Programs ==
In 2010, AMC created a program, "Yeketemoch Mederek" (Cities' Forum), involved public discussion forums between local officials and the public and broadcasts of material from the forums. The forums were generally seen positively by the public and as having an influence on improving local governance.
