= Ethiopian Broadcasting Corporation =

Ethiopian public broadcaster

Ethiopian Broadcasting Corporations ኢትዮጵያ ብሮድካስቲንግ ኮርፖሬሽን

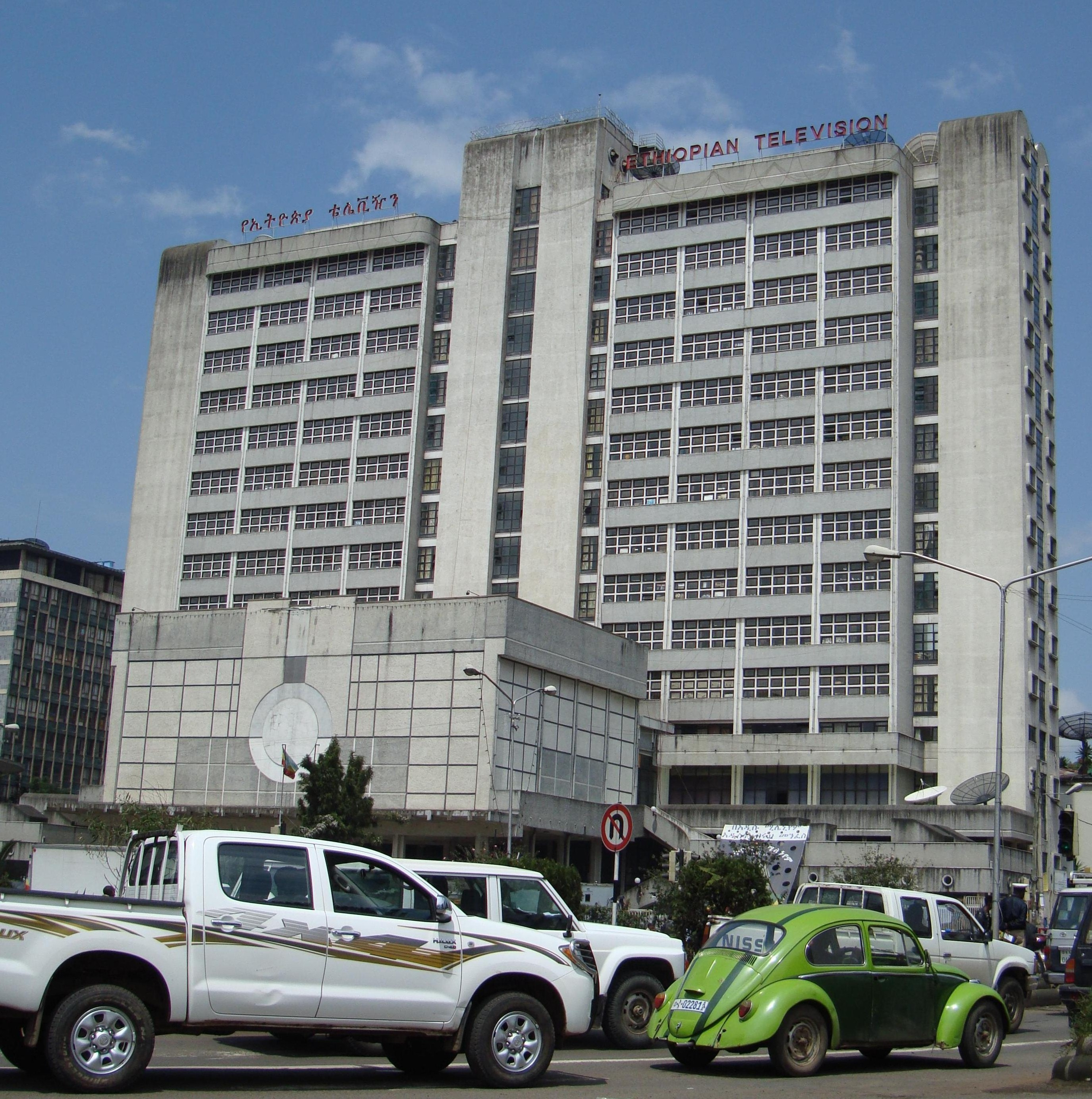
- Old EBC headquarters in Addis Ababa
- Type: Broadcast television network
- Country: Ethiopia
- Availability: Worldwide
- Founded: Radio: 1935; 91 years ago Television: 1962; 64 years ago
- Market share: ETV News: 14%; ETV Entertainment: 7%; ETV Languages: < 1%; ETV Sports:<1
- Licence area: Africa
- Headquarters: Addis Ababa, Ethiopia
- Broadcast area: Worldwide
- Area: Ethiopia
- Owner: Ethiopian government
- Launch date: 2 November 1964; 61 years ago
- Former names: ERTA (1935–2014)
- Official website: www.ebc.et

The Ethiopian Broadcasting Corporations (EBC; Amharic: ኢትዮጵያ ብሮድካስቲንግ ኮርፖሬሽን, romanized: ītiyop’iya birodikasitīnigi koriporēshini), now rebranded as ETV (stylized in all uppercase), is an Ethiopian government-owned public service broadcaster. It is headquartered in Addis Ababa, Ethiopia, and is the country's oldest and largest broadcaster.

EBC was established by order of Emperor Haile Selassie and initially operated by Thomson, a British firm. It is fully owned by the Ethiopian government. Its programming includes news, sport, music and other entertainment. The majority of the programming is broadcast in Amharic, official languages of Ethiopia. Some news segments are broadcast in other languages, such as Oromo, Somali, Tigrinya, Afar, and English.

EBC has entertainment programs like Ethiopian Idol, which features similar content to American got talent show American Idol. In recent this days ETV Entertainment channel stars to broadcast the biggest and the newest entertainment show Ehud Bet (Amharic: እሑድ ቤት), Mulualem Taddesse, Michael Tamere and other young and prominent actors are working as the host of the show. In recent years, ETV has transmitted a few matches a week from European Football Leagues (Spanish La Liga and English Premier League), plus some international matches. EBC transmits its programmes on 4 satellite stations.

EBC has engaged in a continuous content reform leading under EBC towards content motto. Getnet Taddesse is the current CEO of EBC.

== History ==
Ethiopian Television was initially established during Haile Selassie reign era in 1962 with assistance from the British firm, Thomson Television International. Regular transmission began on 2 November 1964. It was created to highlight the Organization of African Unity (OAU) meeting that took place in Addis Ababa that same year. Color television started on an tests in 1979, with regular colour transmissions beginning in 1984 in commemoration of the founding of Workers' Party of Ethiopia (WPE). The current structure and goals of were established 1987 with Proclamation 114/87. In 1995 ERTA(Ethiopian Radio and Television Agency) was created in as the result of the merge between the Ethiopian Radio and the ETV (Ethiopian Television). With the aim of liberalizing the Ethiopian television market, the government upgraded ETV's status to be commercially viable. The station rearranged its transmissions from 6pm to 10pm in two local languages, two of which allotted to Amharic programming. Viewers were concerned that the channel's new schedule concentrated heavily on news - especially regarding its war with Eritrea - and little entertainment. In 2014, the channel changed its name from ETV to EBC, also changing its logo in the process. In 2015, EBC and other regional channels upgraded their news studios with more modern equipment. In March 2018, EBC's logo was transferred to ETV and made a new transmission of frequency and sister's channel contents, and it is now broadcasting on Ethiosat and Nilesat.

During the 2022 FIFA World Cup, FIFA accused EBC of pirating a large number of matches and threatened to permanently withdraw its broadcasting rights. EBC claimed that it was granted the broadcasting rights for all matches, while FIFA claimed it gave a warning before.

=== Facebook page hacking incident ===
Ethiopian Broadcasting Corporation's official Facebook page was hacked and deleted on 4 October 2021. It also ensued losing 2 million followers. The Ministry of Innovation and Technology said that they are working to restore the page. EBC later restored its Facebook account within weeks.

== TV channels ==
=== ETV News HD ===
ETV News (etv ዜና) is the main news channel with 24 hours coverage, with content on culture, politics, documentaries, and economy. Broadcast mostly in Amharic with the exception of some news segments which are broadcast in other languages. ETV News (etv ዜና) is the main news channel with 24 hours coverage, with content on culture, politics, documentaries, and economy.

=== ETV Languages HD ===
ETV Languages is a channel which focuses on news in the varied languages of Ethiopia along with 3 international languages.

=== ETV Entertainment HD ===
ETV Entertainment (ETV መዝናኛ) is a channel which focuses on dramas, as well as lifestyle programming. The channel is most known for broadcasting Ethiopian first family sitcom, Betoch. This channel also airs a lot of popular foreign content including soap operas and Hollywood films.

=== ETV Sport ===
ETV Sport only focuses on broadcasting sport matches and highlights of the English Premier League, European leagues, the Ethiopian Premier League and other international sport tournaments.

=== ETV Afaan Oromo ===
ETV Afaan Oromo is a channel that focuses on news, sports and entertainment in the Afaan Oromo language.

=== ETV Yelijochalem ===
ETV Yelijochalem is a channel that focuses on children's programming.

== Logos ==
Experimental logo

Yelijoch alem

== Radio stations in Ethiopia ==
- Fana FM 90.0
- Awash FM 90.7
- Debub FM 91.6
- Ethiopian National Radio 93.1
- Ahadu FM 94.3
- FM Addis 97.1
- Jimma Fana FM 98.1
- Civil Services FM 100.5
- Bisrat FM 101.1
- Sheger FM 102.1
- Tsedey FM 102.9
- EBC FM 104.7
- Ethio FM 107.8

== Other subsidiary media organizations ==
- OBN (Oromiyaa Broadcast Network)
- Addis TV
- Amhara TV
- Tigray TV
- Somali TV
- Dire TV
- Debub TV
- Harar TV
- Afar TV
- nati Amina 430
