= Amiya =

Amiya may refer to:

== People ==
Amiya is an Indian masculine given name of Sanskrit origin:

- Amiya Bhushan Majumdar (1918-2001), Indian writer
- Amiya Chakravarty (1901–1986), Indian literary critic
- Amiya Chakravarty (director) (1912–1957), Indian filmmaker
- Amiya Deb (1917–1983), Indian sportsman
- Amiya Kanti Bhattacharjee, Indian politician
- Amiya Kumar Bagchi (1936–2024), Indian economic historian
- Amiya Kumar Bhuyan, Indian politician
- Amiya Kumar Dasgupta (1903–1992), Indian developmental economist, father of economist Partha Dasgupta
- Amiya Kumar Kisku, Indian politician
- Amiya Kumar Mallick, Indian sprinter
- Amiya Kumari Padhi (1933-2012), Indian jurist
- Amiya Nath Bose (1915–1996), Indian politician
- Amiya Patnaik, Indian filmmaker
- Amiya Patra, Indian politician
- Amiya Prosad Sen (born 1952), Indian historian
- Amiya Pujari (1948–2003), Indian computer scientist and information technology pioneer
- Amiya Sen (disambiguation)
- Amiya Tagore, Indian musician

== Other uses ==
- العامية, al-ʿāmmiyya, also transliterated as amiya, a local colloquial variety of Arabic
- Amiya, a character from the Arknights video game

== See also ==
- Amya (disambiguation)
- Amaya (disambiguation)
- Ameya or Ananya (actress), Indian actress
- Baby Ameya (born 2018), Indian child actress
- Ameya Pawar, Indian-American politician
- Ameya Vaidyanathan, Indian racing driver
