= Waliso (woreda) =

District in Oromia Region, Ethiopia

Coordinates: 8°25′N 38°05′E

Waliso is one of the woredas in the Oromia Region of Ethiopia. It was part of former Walisona Goro Aanaa what was separated for Goro (Aanaa) and Waliso Aanaa and Waliso Town. Part of the Southwest Shewa Zone, it was bordered on the south by the Southern Nations, Nationalities and Peoples Region, on the west by Amaya, on the northwest by Wonchi, on the north by Dawo, on the northeast by Becho and on the east by Saden Soddo. Towns in Waliso include Waliso and Walee (Former Dilala).

Although coffee is an important cash crop of this woreda, less than 2,000 hectares is planted with this crop.

== Demographics ==
The 2007 national census reported a total population for this woreda of 143,391, of whom 71,567 were men and 71,824 were women; 2,584 or 1.8% of its population were urban dwellers. The majority of the inhabitants said they practised Ethiopian Orthodox Christianity, with 67.05% of the population reporting they observed this belief, while 22.31% of the population were Muslim, and 9.42% were Protestant.

Based on figures published by the Central Statistical Agency in 2005, this woreda has an estimated total population of 262,700, of whom 134,655 are men and 128,045 are women; 53,612 or 20.41% of its population are urban dwellers, which is greater than the Zone average of 12.3%. With an estimated area of 1,115.01 square kilometers, Walisona Goro has an estimated population density of 235.6 people per square kilometer, which is greater than the Zone average of 152.8.

The 1994 national census reported a total population for this woreda of 182,184, of whom 88,913 were men and 93,271 women; 30,017 or 16.48% of its population were urban dwellers at the time. The five largest ethnic groups reported in Walisona Goro were the Oromo (77.51%), Sebat Bet Gurage (12.63%), the Amhara (3.75%), the Silte (3.71%), and the Soddo Gurage (0.99%); all other ethnic groups made up 0.41% of the population. Oromiffa was spoken as a first language by 76.12%, 10% spoke Sebat Bet Gurage, 9.22% spoke Amharic, 2.97% spoke Silte, and 0.79% spoke Soddo; the remaining 0.9% spoke all other primary languages reported. The majority of the inhabitants professed Ethiopian Orthodox Christianity, with 67.43% of the population reporting they practiced that belief, while 30.93% of the population said they were Muslim, and 1.37% were Protestant.
