= Goro =

Goro may refer to:

== Places ==
=== Benin ===
- Goro, Benin, an arrondissement in the Commune of Tchaourou, Borgou

=== Ethiopia ===
- Ejersa Goro, a town in Misraq Hararghe Zone, Oromia
- Goro, Bale, a town in Bale Zone, Oromia
- Goro, Mirab Shewa, a town in Mirab Shewa Zone, Oromia
- Goro, Oromia (woreda), a woreda in Bale Zone of Oromia Region
- Goro, Oromia, Debub Mirab Shewa (woreda), a woreda in Debub Mirab Shewa of Oromia Region
- Goro, SNNPR (woreda), a woreda in Southern Nations, Nationalities and Peoples Region

=== Italy ===
- Goro, Emilia–Romagna, a comune in the Province of Ferrara

=== New Caledonia ===
- Goro, New Caledonia, a community in South Province

== People with the name ==
- Goro Adachi (安達 五郎; 1913–1999), Japanese ski jumper
- Goro Azumaya (東屋 五郎; 1920–2010), Japanese mathematician
- Ijuin Gorō (伊集院 五郎; 1852–1921), Japanese naval officer
- Goro Inagaki (稲垣 吾郎; born 1973), Japanese singer
- Goro Kumagai (熊谷吾良, 1932–2017), Japanese printmaker, educator
- Gorō Matsui (松井 五郎; born 1957), Japanese lyricist
- Gorō Miyazaki (宮崎 吾朗; born 1967), Japanese film director
- Gorō Nakamura (中村 梧郎, Nakamura Gorō; born 1940), Japanese photographer
- Gorō Naya (納谷悟朗, Naya Gorō; 1929-2013), Japanese voice actor
- Goro Nishida (西田 吾郎; 1943–2014), Japanese mathematician
- Goro Noguchi (野口 五郎; born 1956), Japanese singer and actor
- Shiba Gorō (柴 五郎; 1860–1945), Japanese samurai
- Goro Shibutani (渋谷 五郎; 1937–2020), Japanese table tennis player
- Goro Shimura (志村 五郎; 1930–2019), Japanese mathematician
- Gorō Taniguchi (谷口 悟朗; born 1966), Japanese anime director
- Gorō Tsuruta (鶴田 吾郎; 1890–1969), Japanese painter
- Goro Yamada (山田 午郎; 1894–1958), Japanese footballer and manager
- Gorō Yamaguchi (山口 五郎; 1933–1999), Japanese shakuhachi player

== Fictional characters ==
- Goro (Mortal Kombat), a character in the Mortal Kombat video game series
- Goro Akechi, a character in the video game Persona 5
- Goro Daimon, a character in the King of Fighters video game series
- Goro Majima, a character from the Yakuza video game series
- Goro, a role in the opera Madama Butterfly
- Goro, the U.S. name of Nyamco in Mappy
- Goro, a character in the anime Darling in the Franxx
- Goro, a character in the video game Dark Cloud
- Goro Hoshino, a character in the television series Chōriki Sentai Ohranger
- Goro Makiba, a character in the Grendizer
- Goro Sakurai, a character in the J.A.K.Q. Dengekitai
- Goro Yura, a character in the Kamen Rider Ryuki
- Goro Takemura, a character in the video game Cyberpunk 2077
- Gorou (五郎), a character in the video game Genshin Impact

== Other ==
- Goro (sweet bread), a Norwegian sweet bread

== See also ==
- Goroawase
