= Tole (woreda) =

District in Oromia Region, Ethiopia

Coordinates: 8°35′N 38°20′E

Tole is one of the woredas in Oromia Region, Ethiopia. Part of the Southwest Shewa Zone, it is bordered on the southwest by Kokir, on the west by Becho, on the northwest by Elu, on the northeast by the Awash which separates it from Alem Gena, and on the east and south by Kersana Kondaltiti. The major town in Tole is Bentu Liben.

== Demographics ==
The 2007 national census reported a total population for this woreda, of 62,895, of whom 31,798 were men and 31,097 were women; 2,895 or 4.6% of its population were urban dwellers. The majority of the inhabitants said they practised Ethiopian Orthodox Christianity, with 98.48% of the population reporting they observed this belief, while 5.37% of the population were Muslim, 4.57% observed traditional beliefs, and 2.44% were Protestant.

Based on figures published by the Central Statistical Agency in 2005, this woreda has an estimated total population of 62,252, of whom 30,960 are men and 31,292 are women; 2,272 or 3.65% of its population are urban dwellers, which is less than the Zone average of 12.3%. With an estimated area of 438.6 square kilometers, Tole has an estimated population density of 141.9 people per square kilometer, which is less than the Zone average of 152.8.

The 1994 national census reported a total population for this woreda of 44,932, of whom 22,719 were men and 22,213 women; 1,273 or 2.83% of its population were urban dwellers at the time. The two largest ethnic groups reported in Tole were the Oromo (94.97%), and the Amhara (4.54%); all other ethnic groups made up 0.49% of the population. Oromo was spoken as a first language by 97.91%, while 1.91% spoke Amharic; the remaining 0.18% spoke all other primary languages reported. The majority of the inhabitants professed Ethiopian Orthodox Christianity, with 99.18% of the population reporting they practiced that belief.
