= Amya =

Amya may refer to:

- Amya, Dawei, a village in Dawei District, Taninthayi Division, Myanmar
- Amya, Hama, a village located in Al-Saan Subdistrict in Salamiyah District, Hama, Syria
- Amya, an alternative and derivative of the Spanish given name and surname Amaya

== See also ==
- Amaya (disambiguation)
- Amyas, a name
