= Wenchi Project =

National project in Ethiopia established in 2020

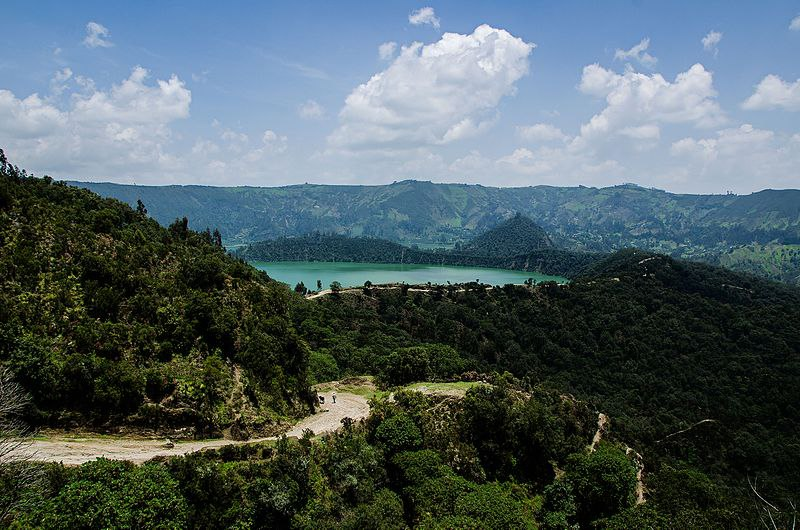
- Wenchi Crater Lake in Wanchi, Oromia Region
- Location: Wanchi, Dendi Oromia Region
- Owner: Ethiopian government
- Country: Ethiopia
- Prime Minister(s): Abiy Ahmed
- Established: 20 August 2020
- Website: www.wenchi-crater-lake.com/about.php

Wenchi Project (Amharic: ወንጪ ፕሮጀክት) is a national project launched by the Ethiopian government "Dine for Ethiopia" initiatives under Prime Minister Abiy Ahmed on 20 August 2020. Alongside Gorgora and Koysha Projects, Wenchi Project aimed to promote sustainable ecosystem and tourism in Wenchi town in Oromia Region. In March 2021, Prime Minister Abiy Ahmed launched Wenchi tourist attraction development project, which incorporates Wonchi-Dedi Project between Wenchi and Dendi woredas.

The project is handled by the China Communications Construction Company (CCCC) and costs 4.2 billion birr.

== History ==
Wenchi Project was a part of Dine for Ethiopia initiatives, alongside Gorgora and Koysha Projects launched on 20 August 2020 by Prime Minister Abiy Ahmed. On 20 March 2021, Prime Minister Abiy Ahmed launched Wenchi tourist attraction development project. Wonchi-Dedi Project is one of integrated projects in Wenchi and Dendi woredas launched in 2021 to contribute benefits for local residents of the area with maintaining and protecting abundant natural resources. The other entity is Wenchi Eco-Tourism Association (WETA), which was established in 2002, to promote ecotourism by presenting village's natural resource to local residents. The Project is handled by the China Communications Construction Company (CCCC) and costs 4.2 billion birr.
