= Bentu Liben =

Town in Oromia Region, Ethiopia

Bentu Liben Bantuu liiban (Oromo)
- Town
- Location within Ethiopia
- Coordinates: 8°37′N 38°22′E
- Country: Ethiopia
- Region: Oromia
- Zone: West Shewa
- Elevation: 2,234 m (7,329 ft)

Population (2005)
  - Total: 2,381
- Time zone: UTC+3 (EAT)

Bentu Liben (also known as Liben) is a town in central Oromia Region, Ethiopia. Located in the Southwest Shewa Zone about 40 kilometers south-west of Addis Ababa, this town has a latitude and longitude of 8°37′N 38°22′E with an elevation of 2234 meters above sea level.

Based on figures from the Central Statistical Agency in 2005, Bentu Liben has an estimated total population of 2,381 of whom 1,113 were males and 1,268 were females. The 1994 census reported this town had a total population of 1,273 of whom 576 were males and 697 were females. It is the largest town in Tole woreda.

Records at the Nordic Africa Institute website provide details of a primary school in Bentu Liben during the year 1968.
