= Amiyah =

Amiyah may refer to:

- Amaya (disambiguation)
- A local colloquial variety of Arabic, called العامية, al-ʿāmmiyya, in Modern Standard Arabic
