= Gorgora Project =

National project in Ethiopia launched in 2020

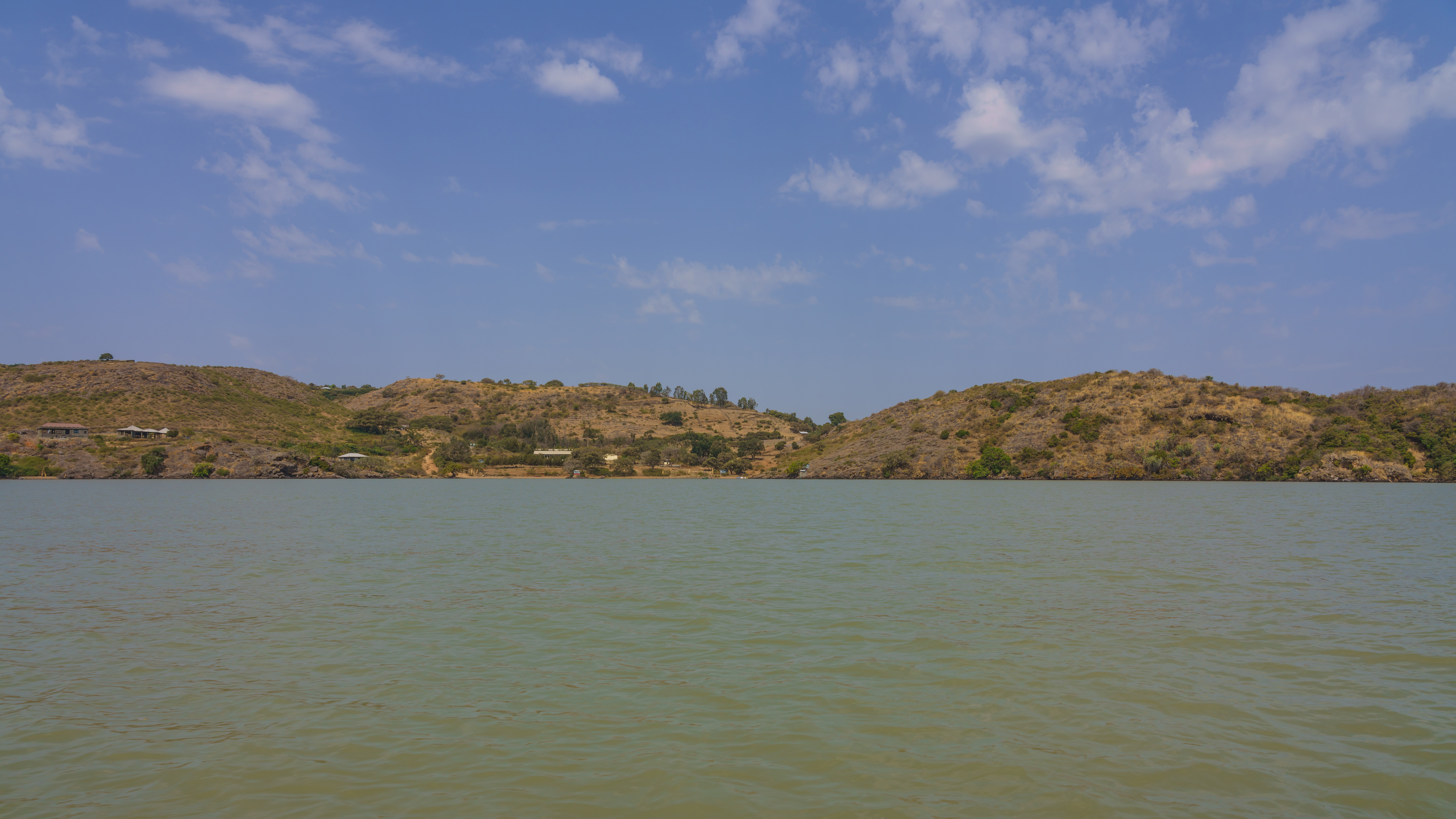
- Lake Tana at Gorgora town in Amhara Region
- Location: Gorgora, Amhara Region
- Owner: Ethiopian government
- Country: Ethiopia
- Prime Minister(s): Abiy Ahmed
- Key people: Fiseha Assefa (Manager)
- Established: 20 August 2020

Gorgora Project (Amharic: ጎርጎራ ፕሮጀክት) is a national project initiated by the Ethiopian government "Dine for Nation" initiatives under Prime Minister Abiy Ahmed on 20 August 2020. The project took place in Gorgora town in Amhara Region with 4.2 billion birr expenditure along with sister projects in Wenchi and Koysha.

The first phase of project was started in March 2021 by Ahmed. On 13 July 2024, Gorgora Eco Resort has been inaugurated by Prime Minister Abiy Ahmed.

== History ==
Gorgora Project took place in Gorgora, a town in Amhara Region. Along with Wenchi and Koysha Projects, Gorgora is part of national project launched on 20 August 2020 by Prime Minister Abiy Ahmed to facilitate tourism sector and preserving natural resources of the country. Part of Dine for Nation initiatives, the construction took place in Lake Tana and its port. On 17 January 2023, the project manager Fiseha Assefa announced the progress near completion. In his statement, the project was at good progress with good speed and quality. On 13 July 2024, Gorgora Eco Resort was inaugurated by Prime Minister Abiy Ahmed.. The first phase of project was launched on 7 March 2021 by Ahmed. Gorgora Project costs 4.2 billion birr along with other projects.
