= Dawo =

Administrative division of Ethiopia

Coordinates: 8°45′N 38°10′E

Dawo is one of the Aanaas in the Oromia of Ethiopia. Part of the Southwest Shewa Zone, Dawo is bordered on the southwest by Waliso, on the west and north by Dendi, on the east by Elu, and on the southeast by Becho. The major town in Dawo is Busa.

Dawo is well known for its quality teff, which is marketed in Addis Ababa. However the woreda is located 96 kilometers from the capital (80 kilometers paved with asphalt and 16 kilometers gravel).

== Demographics ==
The 2007 national census reported a total population for this woreda of 84,336, of whom 42,815 were men and 41,521 were women; 3,779 or 4.48% of its population were urban dwellers. The majority of the inhabitants said they practised Ethiopian Orthodox Christianity, with 94.78% of the population reporting they observed this belief, while 2.78% of the population practiced Islam, and 1.89% were Protestant.

Based on figures published by the Central Statistical Agency in 2005, this woreda had an estimated total population of 80,529, of whom 40,270 were men and 40,259 were women; 2,032 or 2.52% of its population were urban dwellers, which is less than the Zone average of 12.3%. With an estimated area of 426.88 square kilometers, Dawo has an estimated population density of 188.6 people per square kilometer, which is greater than the Zone average of 152.8.

The 1994 national census reported a total population for this woreda of 58,276, of whom 29,317 were men and 28,969 women; 1,140 or 1.96% of its population were urban dwellers at the time. The two largest ethnic groups reported in Dawo were the Oromo (93.35%), and the Amhara (6.17%); all other ethnic groups made up 0.48% of the population. Oromiffa was spoken as a first language by 98.04%, while 1.88% spoke Amharic; the remaining 0.48% spoke all other primary languages reported. The majority of the inhabitants were Orthodox Christians, with 99.58% of the population reporting they embraced that belief.
