= Sodo Dacha =

District in Oromia Region, Ethiopia

Sodo Dachi is one of the district in the Oromia Region of Ethiopia. Its capital city is Terre. it was part of Kersa Malima district. It is part of the south west Shewa Zone.

== Demographics ==
The 2007 national census reported a total population for this woreda of 43,607, of whom 22,178 were men and 21,429 were women; 2,732 or 6.23% of its population were urban dwellers. The majority of the inhabitants said they practised Ethiopian Orthodox Christianity, with 97.4% of the population reporting they observed this belief, while 1.53% were Protestant.most population is Gurage ethnic backgrounds
