= Kersana Malima =

District in Oromia Region, Ethiopia

Coordinates: 8°30′N 38°35′E

Kersa Malima or Kersa and Malima, is a Aanaa in Oromia, Ethiopia. Part of the Southwest Shewa Zone, Kersana Mailma is bordered on the south by the Southern Nations, Nationalities and Peoples Region, on the west by Kokir, on the northwest by Tole, on the northeast by Sebeta Hawas, and on the east by the East Shewa Zone; the Awash defines the boundary between this woreda and Alem Gena and the Misraq Shewa Zone. The major town in Kersana Malima is Leman. Sodo Dacha woreda was separated from Kersana Malima.

The altitude of this woreda ranges from 1500 to 2900 meters above sea level. Local landmarks include the Melka Kunture prehistoric archeological site, where finds from the Paleolithic through the Neolithic periods have been recovered, and Adadi Maryam church, the southernmost existing rock-hewn church in the style of the better known monolithic churches of the Tigray Region.

== Demographics ==
The 2007 national census reported a total population for this woreda of 81,015, of whom 41,366 were men and 39,649 were women; 6,536 or 8.07% of its population were urban dwellers. The majority of the inhabitants said they practised Ethiopian Orthodox Christianity, with 98.23% of the population reporting they observed this belief, while 1.48% of the population were Protestant.

Based on figures published by the Central Statistical Agency in 2005, this woreda has an estimated total population of 127,704, of whom 63,442 are men and 64,262 are women; 3,534 or 2.77% of its population are urban dwellers, which is less than the Zone average of 12.3%. With an estimated area of 975.94 square kilometers, Kersana Kondaltiti has an estimated population density of 130.9 people per square kilometer, which is less than the Zone average of 152.8.

The 1994 national census reported a total population for this woreda of 92,364, of whom 46,762 were men and 45,602 women; 1,981 or 2.14% of its population were urban dwellers at the time. The three largest ethnic groups reported in Kersana Kondaltiti were the Oromo (94.01%), the Amhara (3.21%), and the Soddo Gurage (2.44%); all other ethnic groups made up 0.34% of the population. Oromiffa was spoken as a first language by 93.86%, 3.21% spoke Soddo, and 2.8% spoke Amharic; the remaining 1.13% spoke all other primary languages reported. The majority of the inhabitants professed Ethiopian Orthodox Christianity, with 99.22% of the population reporting they practiced that belief.
