= Wanchi =

District in Oromia Region, Ethiopia

Coordinates: 8°40′N 37°55′E

Wancii, also spelled Wancii in Oromo, is a woreda in the central Oromia Region of Ethiopia. It is located in the Southwest Shewa Zone; bordered on the southwest by Amaya, on the north by West Shewa Zone (Ambo district), and on the southeast by Waliso district and Goro District. The administrative centre of Wanchi is Chitu. Dariyan and Haroo-Wancii have emerged as rapidly growing rural towns. Specially Haroo-Wancii town, which is located at a distance of 5 km from Wancii Crater lake, is attracting the attention of many investors and booming.

The highest point in Wanchi is Wonchi volcano, which is about 3,450 metres (11,320 ft) above sea level. The volcano contains a caldera and crater lake with islands and an ancient monastery, all which makes the caldera a popular tourist destination. Warqee (also known as Enset) is by far the most important staple crop in the area.

== Demographics ==
The 2007 national census reported a total population for this woreda of 93,624, of whom 46,915 were men and 46,709 were women; 1,905 or 2.04% of its population were urban dwellers. The majority of the inhabitants said they practised Ethiopian Orthodox Christianity, with 70.12% of the population reporting they observed this belief, while 28.41% of the population were Protestant, and 1.28% were Muslim.

Based on figures published by the Central Statistical Agency in 2005, this woreda has an estimated total population of 108,550, of whom 55,090 are men and 53,460 are women; 1,574 or 1.45% of its population are urban dwellers, which is less than the Zone average of 12.3%. With an estimated area of 457.51 square kilometers, Wonchi has an estimated population density of 237.3 people per square kilometer, which is greater than the Zone average of 152.8.

The 1994 national census reported a total population for this woreda of 78,736, of whom 39,009 were men and 39,727 women; 880 or 1.12% of its population were urban dwellers at the time. The two largest ethnic groups reported in Wonchi were the Oromo (98.87%), and the Amhara (0.84%); all other ethnic groups made up 0.29% of the population. Oromo was spoken as a first language by 99.46%. The majority of the inhabitants professed Ethiopian Orthodox Christianity, with 93.18% of the population reporting they practiced that belief, while 5.23% of the population said they were Protestant, and 1.1% were Muslim.
