= Becho =

District in Oromia Region, Ethiopia

Coordinates: 8°35′N 38°15′E

Becho is one of the woredas in the Oromia Region of Ethiopia. Part of the Southwest Shewa Zone, Becho is bordered on the south by Saden Sodo, on the west by Waliso, on the northwest by Dawo, on the north by Elu, and on the east by Tole. The major town in Becho is Tulu Bolo.

== Demographics ==
The 2007 national census reported a total population for this woreda of 74,016, of whom 37,481 were men and 36,535 were women; 14,476 or 19.56% of its population were urban dwellers. The majority of the inhabitants said they practised Ethiopian Orthodox Christianity, with 95.17% of the population reporting they observed this belief, while 2.18% of the population were Muslim, 1.46% were Protestant, and 1.09% observed traditional beliefs.

Based on figures published by the Central Statistical Agency in 2005, this woreda has an estimated total population of 75,279, of whom 37,702 are men and 37,577 are women; 14,307 or 19.01% of its population are urban dwellers, which is greater than the Zone average of 12.3%. With an estimated area of 426.72 square kilometers, Becho has an estimated population density of 176.4 people per square kilometer, which is greater than the Zone average of 152.8.

The 1994 national census reported a total population for this woreda of 52,393, of whom 26,225 were men and 26,168 women; 8,011 or 15.29% of its population were urban dwellers at the time. The three largest ethnic groups reported in Becho were the Oromo (90.32%), the Amhara (6.87%), and the Siltʼe (1.66%); all other ethnic groups made up 1.15% of the population. Oromo was spoken as a first language by 90.35%, 8.13% spoke Amharic, and 1.05% Siltʼe; the remaining 0.47% spoke all other primary languages reported. The majority of the inhabitants professed Ethiopian Orthodox Christianity, with 96.93% of the population reporting they practiced that belief, while 2.31% of the population said they were Muslim.
