= Amaya (Burgos) =

- Village
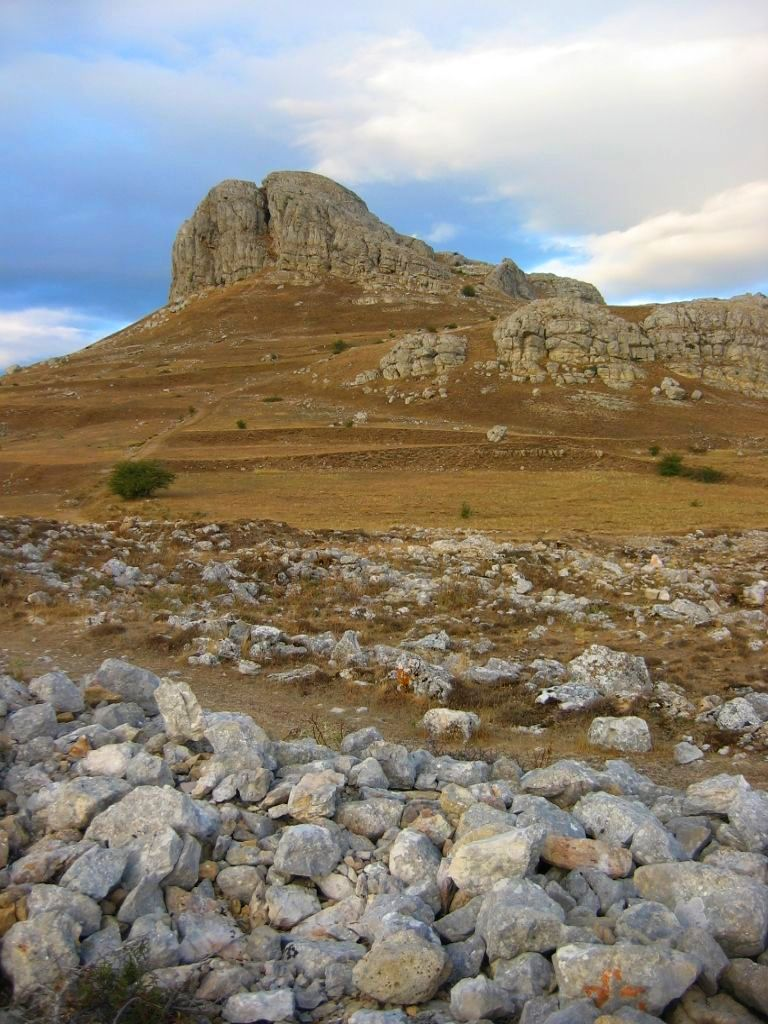
- Peña Amaya in Castile and León

- Location in Spain
- Coordinates: 42.64167°N 4.16389°W
- Country: Spain
- Autonomous community: Castile and León
- Province: Burgos
- Municipality: Sotresgudo
- First mentioned: 574 AD

Government
  - Pedáneo: José Roberto Bustillo Arroyo

Population (2024)
  - Total: 37
- Postal code: 09136

There are other meanings for Amaya.

Amaya is a village (pop. 67 (as of 2002)) located in the municipality of Sotresgudo, Burgos, in the region of Castile-Leon, Spain.

== Geography ==
Located in the municipality of Sotresgudo, in the province of Burgos, within the autonomous community of Castile and León, northern Spain. Amaya sits on a strategic hilltop overlooking the Odra River valley, at approximately 1,000 meters (3,280 feet) above sea level. Its historical importance as a fortified settlement during the pre-Roman, Roman, and Visigothic periods. Amaya lies about 8.8 km from the municipal center of Sotresgudo and is accessible via local roads connecting it to nearby towns in the Burgos province.

The name of the village has Indo-European roots and means "am (ma)" or "mother". The suffix io-ia is also used to form action names or toponyms, implying that the meaning of Amaya or Amaia is "mother city", as it will be called later "the capital". An alternative hypothesis states that the name derives from the Proto-Basque or Basque word Amaia, meaning "the end".

== History ==
=== Prehistory ===
Amaya was one of the main villages of the Cantabri Celtic tribes, and played a key role in the Cantabrian wars during the Roman conquest of Hispania, and later, during the Visigothic Kingdom, as the capital of the Duchy of Cantabria.

Amaya is mentioned in the Chronicle of John of Biclaro, as a town captured by the Visigothic king Liuvigild in 574.

=== Ancient History ===
According to the Muslim chroniclers, in the year 714, Musa ibn Nusair sacked Amaya for the second time after Tariq did the year before. Peter, the provincial dux, led his people into refuge in the mountains, and after the local noble Pelayo of Asturias in the neighbor region of Asturias started a rebellion against the Berber garrison, Dux Peter as other western Galician nobles supported the election of him as new King or Princeps in the lead against the common enemy.

=== Middle Ages ===
In the first stages of the Reconquista, the city was part of the repopulating efforts of the Kingdom of Asturias in the border region of Bardulia, the primitive territories of Castile. After the campaigns of Alfonso I of Asturias (739-757) against the Moors, the city lay an abandoned in the largely empty buffer zone between Moors and Christians known at the time as "The Desert of the Duero" and was part of the repopulation campaign carried out a century later, during the reign of Ordoño I of Asturias (850-866).

At that time it was an important and significant place, as a very old saying states: "Harto era Castilla pequeño rincón, cuando Amaya era la cabeza y Montes de Oca el mojón" (A very small corner was Castile, when Amaya was the head and Montes de Oca the boundary stone).

=== Modern Age ===
Amaya was historically a short-lived bishopric, which is no longer an active residential diocese. Presently, the Catholic Church recognizes Amaya as a titular see, which means it holds symbolic significance within the Church hierarchy.
