= Goro, West Shewa Zone =

Goro is a town in central Ethiopia. Located in the West Shewa Zone of the Oromia Regional State, this town has a latitude and longitude of 8°23′N 37°51′E.

Based on figures from the Central Statistical Agency in 2005, this town has an estimated total population of 2,030 of whom 983 were males and 1,047 were females. The 1994 census reported this town had a total population of 1,136 of whom 533 were males and 603 were females. It is one of two towns in Goro woreda.
