= Sebastiano Castagna =

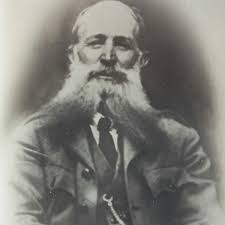
Portrait of Sebastiano Castagna, c. 1936–1938

Sebastiano Castagna (27 August 1868 – 5 October 1938) was an Italian engineer decorated with the Gold Medal of Military Valour for his service in Italian East Africa.

== Biography ==
Sebastiano Castagna was born in Aidone, Sicily on 27 August 1868, son of Adolfo Castagna and Emma De Vecchi. He enlisted in the Royal Army in 1889 and was promoted to sergeant the following year, he was then assigned to the sappers of the Cacciatori d'Africa in Massawa on 28 October 1890. Four years later he was transferred to the Royal Corps of Eritrean Colonial Troops and after having participated in the campaign of 1895-1896, he was discharged in 1905 with the rank of quartermaster major.

Castagna then settled in Ethiopia and married a local Ethiopian noblewoman. He subsequently entered into the service of the Ethiopian government and was appointed Head of Public Works, designing and building bridges, roads, aqueducts and other public works. He designed St George's Cathedral, an Ethiopian Orthodox cathedral in Addis Ababa, Ethiopia.

After the Italian conquest of Ethiopia, Castagna was entrusted by the Italian government with important peacemaking missions involving the Ethiopian rebels. On 28 December 1936, he met with Ras Desta Damtew to discuss submission to the Italians. Castagna reported to Rodolfo Graziani that Ras Desta was inclined to submit but feared the reaction of his roughly 3,000 followers, who expected no mercy from the Italians. In May 1938, he mediated negotiations between Abebe Aregai and Ugo Cavallero. After visiting Abebe's camp, Castagna reported that the rebels suffered from low morale and were opened to a compromise. On 5 October 1938, Castagna was murdered in Cusae, after having escaped an attempted kidnapping by the brigands of Geresu Duki. He was posthumously awarded the Gold Medal of Military Valour. His medal citation reads:

A veteran of the first campaigns in Africa, a pioneer in very difficult times in Ethiopia, an advocate of noble Italianness in countries still barbarous, a valuable collaborator of our government bodies, he placed all his abilities at the service of his country, making himself a worthy architect of that work which led to the conquest of the empire. For the definitive pacification of the conquered lands, he often, with unparalleled courage, volunteered to go, without any defense and without certain guarantees, to enemy or rebel leaders. Having fallen into the vile trap of a traitorous rebel leader, who invited him with a flattering letter to present himself for a parley and then take him hostage, the seventy-year-old managed to elude surveillance and regain his freedom by fleeing. Searched for and caught through the bush, he did not bow his heroic head and fell under enemy fire rather than accept the surrender offered to him by a barbarian. Cusae, 5 October 1938.
