= Saitama University =

Japanese national university

- 埼玉大学
- Motto: Japanese: 研こう！知と技
- Motto in English: Let's cultivate! Knowledge and skill
- Type: National
- Established: 1873 (chartered 1949)
- President: Takafumi Sakai
- Undergraduates: 6821
- Postgraduates: 1520
- Location: Saitama, Saitama, Japan; 35°51′47″N 139°36′27″E
- Campus: Urban
- Website: English
- Japan Saitama Prefecture

Academic rankings

National
- U.S. News & World Report: 64

Global
- QS: 1001-1200
- THE: 1501+
- U.S. News & World Report: 1960

Saitama University (埼玉大学, Saitama Daigaku) is a Japanese national university located in a suburban area of Sakura-ku, Saitama City, capital of Saitama Prefecture in Tokyo Metropolitan Area.

Founded in 1873, it became a national university is 1949, and currently has five faculties (schools) for undergraduate education: Liberal Arts, Education, Economics, Science, and Engineering; and four graduate schools: Cultural Science, Education, Economic Science, and Science and Engineering. All of these schools offer programs leading to doctorates as well as master's degrees. The total enrollment in the university is more than 8,500 with more than 500 overseas students pursuing undergraduate and postgraduate studies. Its abbreviated form is Saidai (埼大).

== History ==
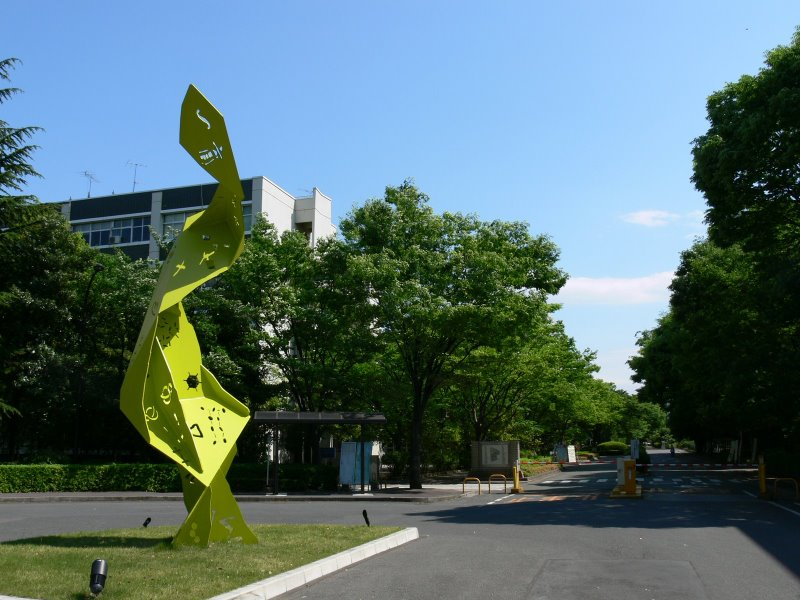
Saitama university

The predecessor of the university, Saitama Normal School, was founded in 1873. It was chartered as a national university in 1949 by the merger of Urawa Higher School (浦和高等学校, Urawa Kōtō Gakkō) established 1929, Saitama Normal School (埼玉師範学校, Saitama Shihan Gakkō), and Saitama Youth Normal School (埼玉青年師範学校, Saitama Seinen Shihan Gakkō) established 1922.

== Campuses ==
=== Ōkubo campus ===
Ōkubo campus is the main campus in Saitama university and can be accessed by bus or walking from Minami-Yono Station, Kita-Urawa Station, or Shiki Station.

=== Satellite campuses ===
Saitama university has two satellite campuses:

- Omiya Sonic City College (accessed from Ōmiya Station)
- Tokyo Station College (accessed from Tōkyō Station)

== International Graduate Program ==
To provide aspiring overseas students an opportunity to pursue higher education in Japan, International Graduate Program on Civil and Environmental Engineering was launched by the Graduate School of Science and Engineering in 1992. It offers opportunities to highly qualified students from overseas to pursue graduate studies and do research in various disciplines of environmental science and civil engineering. The fields of study include Infrastructure Management, Transportation Planning, Environmental Engineering, Ecological Engineering, Coastal, and Ocean Engineering, Hydraulics and Water Resources Engineering, Geotechnical and Geological Engineering, Concrete and Material Engineering, Structural and Wind Engineering, Earthquake Engineering.

The graduate program includes courses specially designed for international students, in which class instruction and research supervision are given in English and/or Japanese. Master thesis and doctoral dissertation are accepted in English. Japanese language courses are also offered for foreign students and their spouses. So far, 215 students from different countries have graduated from this program and are now engaged in academic and professional activities in different parts of the world.

There are also graduate programs in English in the Graduate School of Humanities and Social Sciences. In April 2015, Saitama University launched the Department of Japanese and Asian Studies, an English based MA program. The MEcon program in Japanese and Asian Economy and Management was later released. These were designed specifically to attract international students.

== Department of Diversity Studies ==
In April 2026, Saitama University released a brand new graduate school focusing on diversity studies. Although its currently limited to MA, it is the first university in Japan to offer a program directly on DEI related topics.

== Merin-chan ==
Saitama university's mascot is a sprout named "Merin-chan". Merin-chan is lime green with a light blue star on her chest. Her birthday is November 1 and her hobby is basking in the sun. She's also terrified of ghosts.

Merin-chan was created as part of a contest to select a mascot character for Saitama University’s 60th anniversary. She was designed to resemble a fresh sprout to reflect Saitama University’s signature lime green color while symbolizing the blossoming and growth of talent. The star recommends the 5 academic schools as well as their radiance.

== Notable people ==
=== Notable alumni ===
- Milojko Spajić (born 1987), Montenegrin politician, Prime Minister of Montenegro
- Takaaki Kajita (born 1959), physicist, 2015 Nobel Prize in Physics winner
- Lê Minh Hưng (born 1970), Vietnamese politician, governor of the State Bank of Vietnam, Prime Minister of Vietnam

=== Notable faculty ===
- Goro Kumagai (1932–2017) woodcut printmaker, educator, illustrator; taught from 1961 until 1998

== Gallery ==
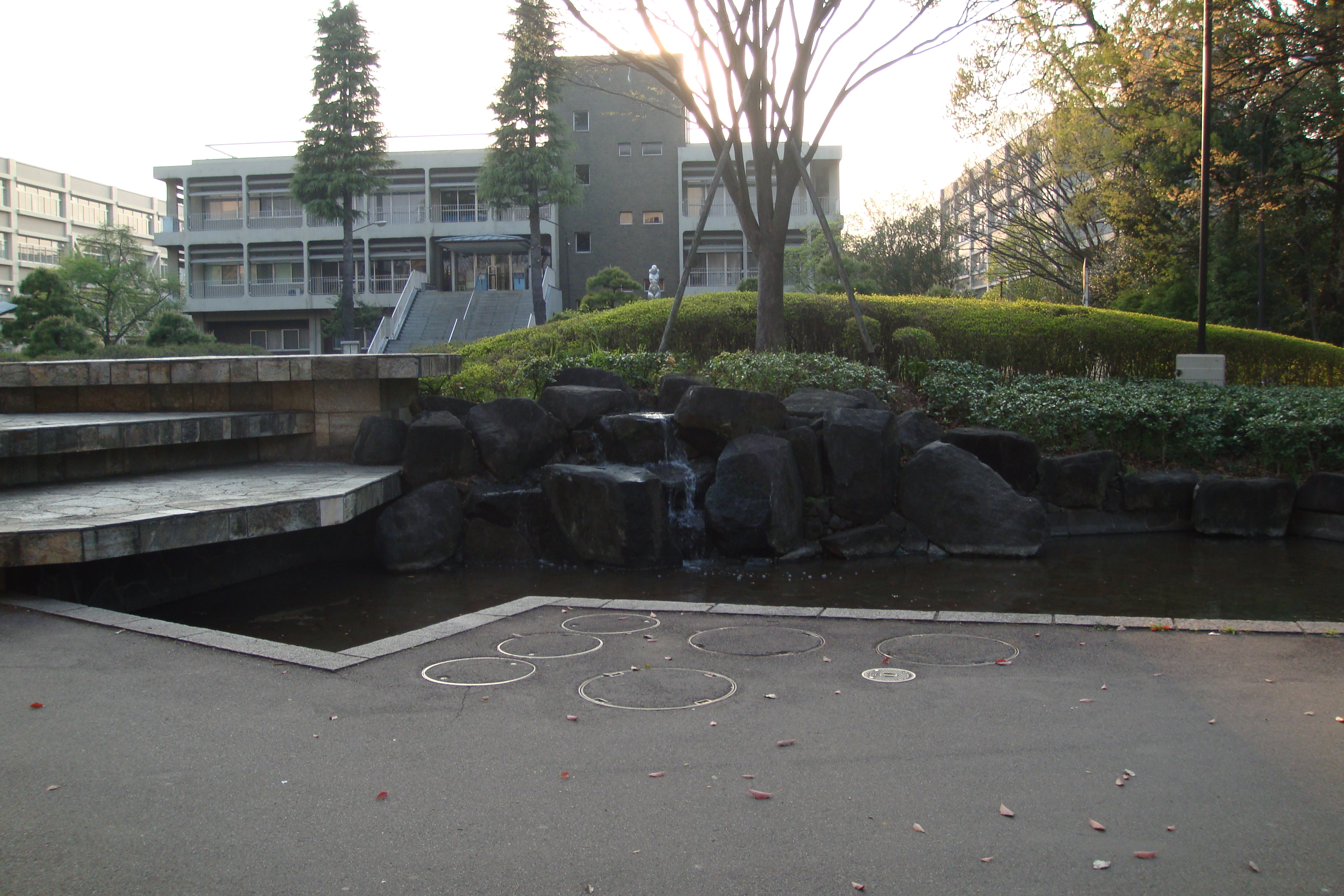
Front of Library

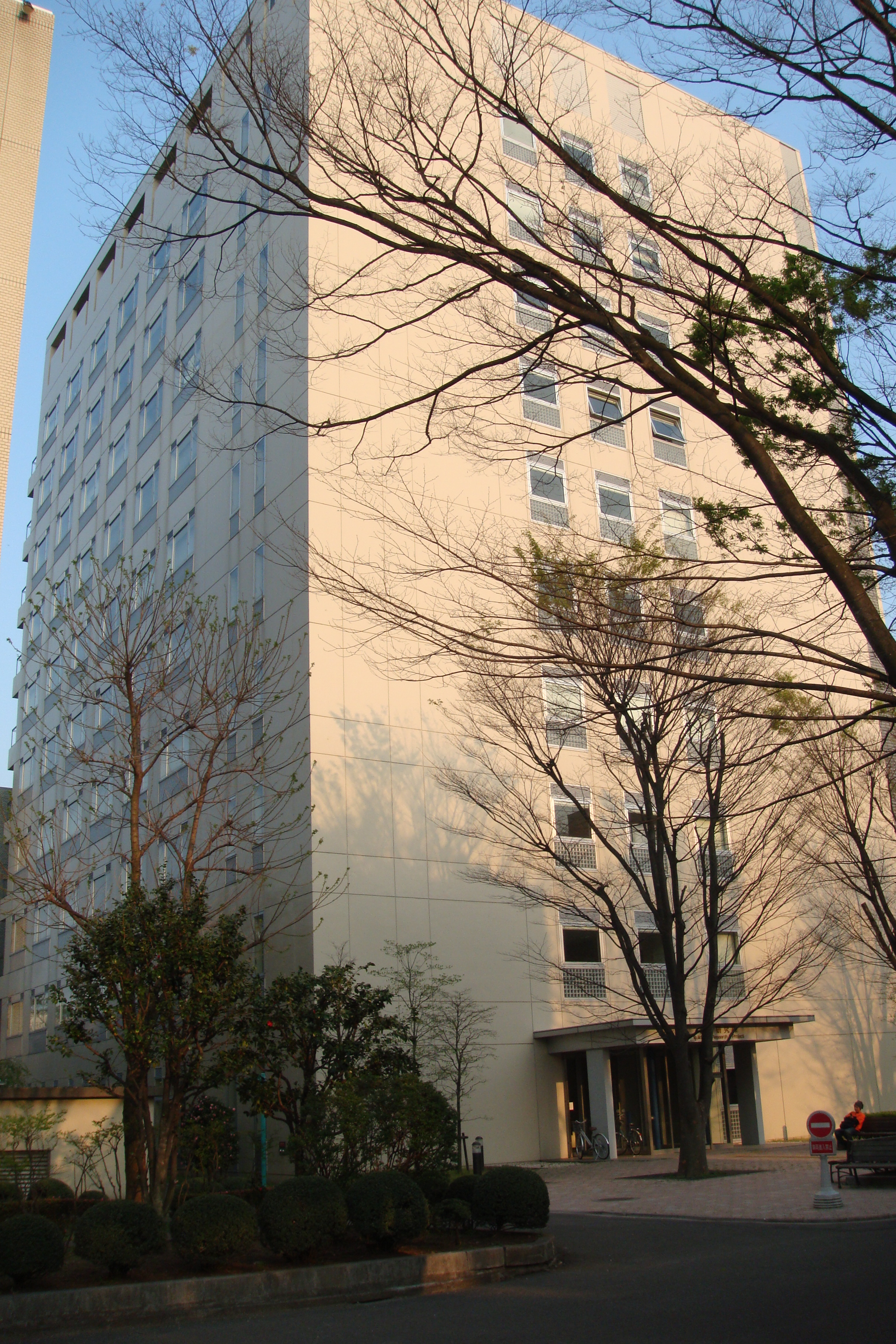
Research and Project building

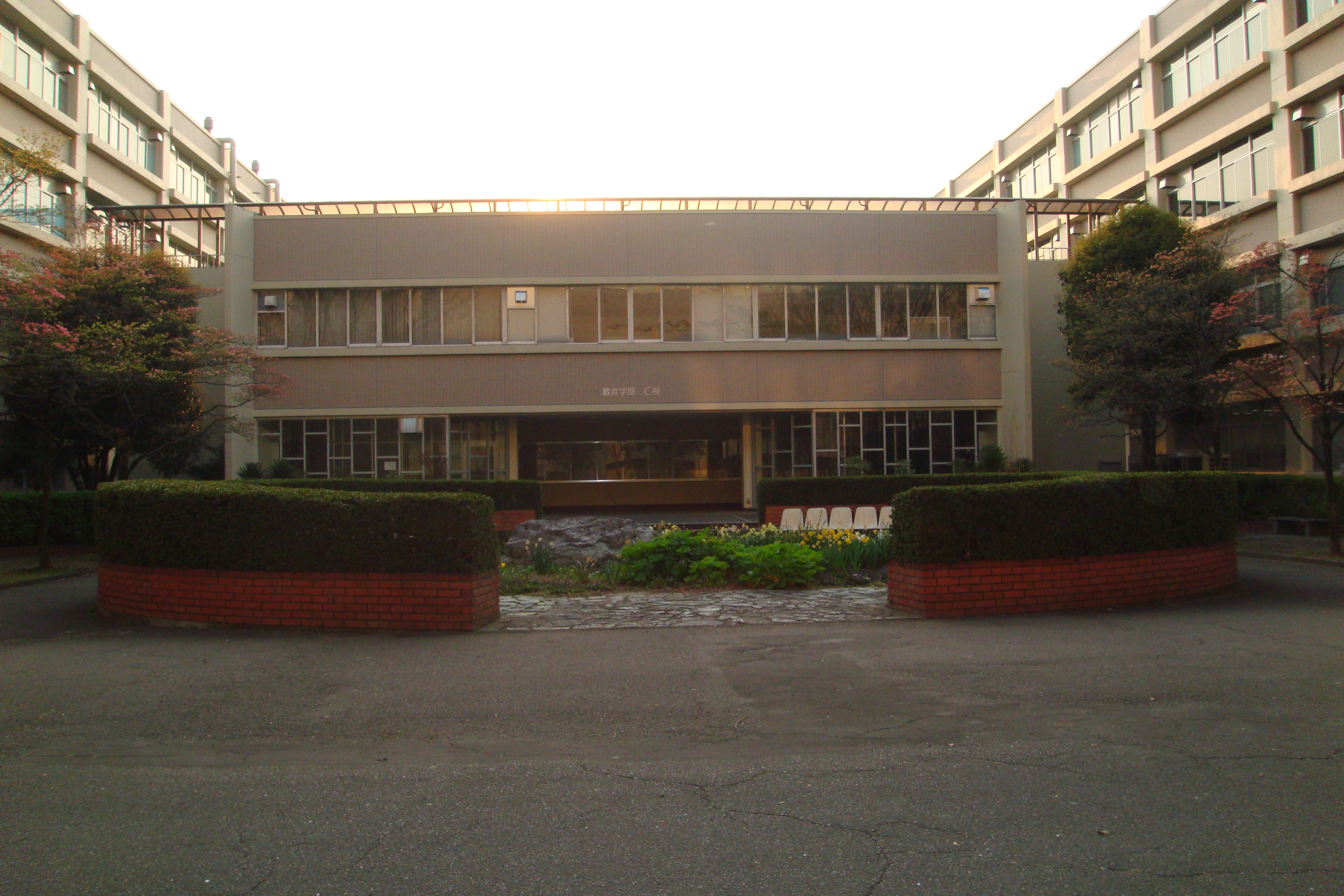
View of Saitama University

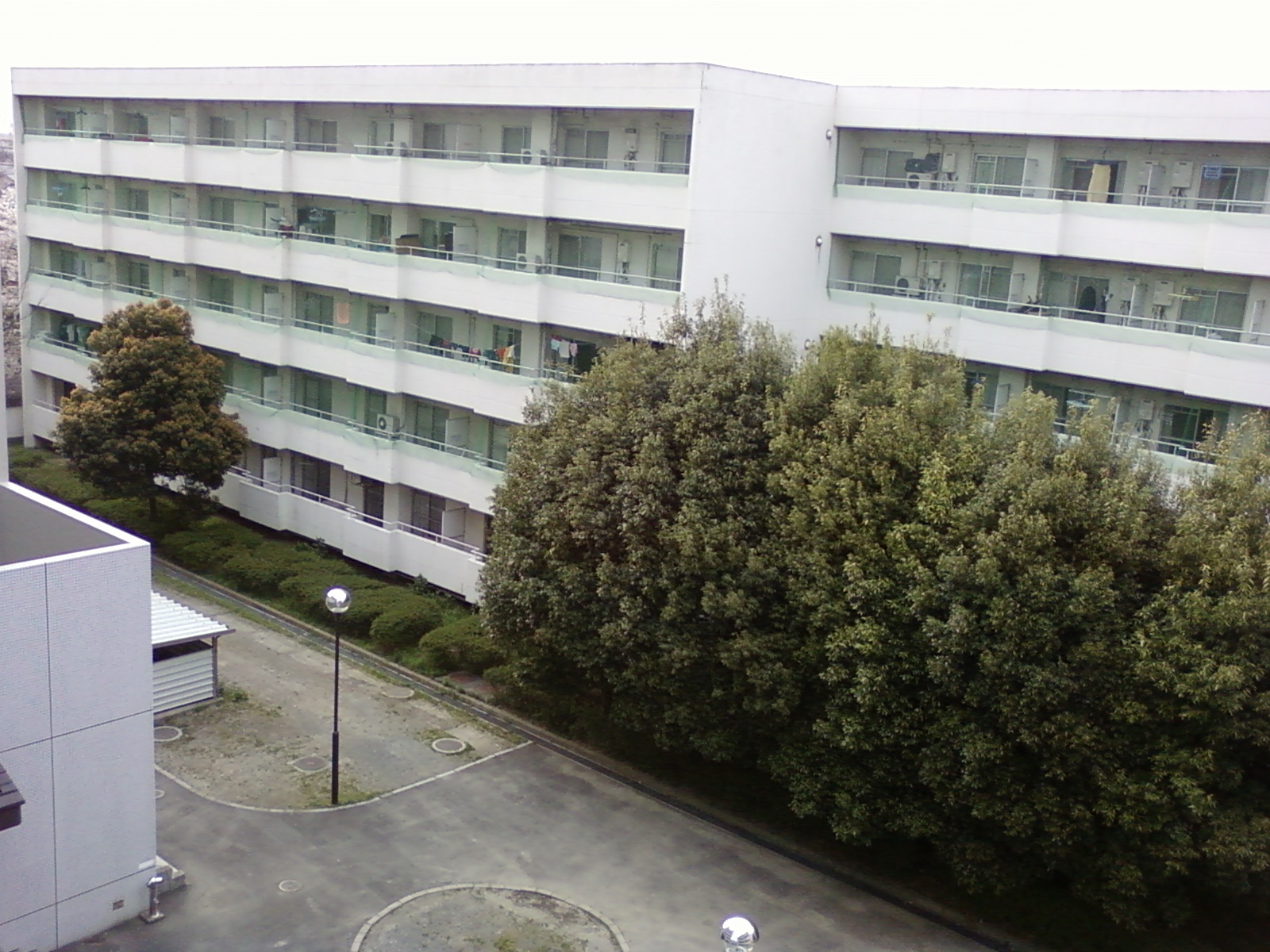
International House 1

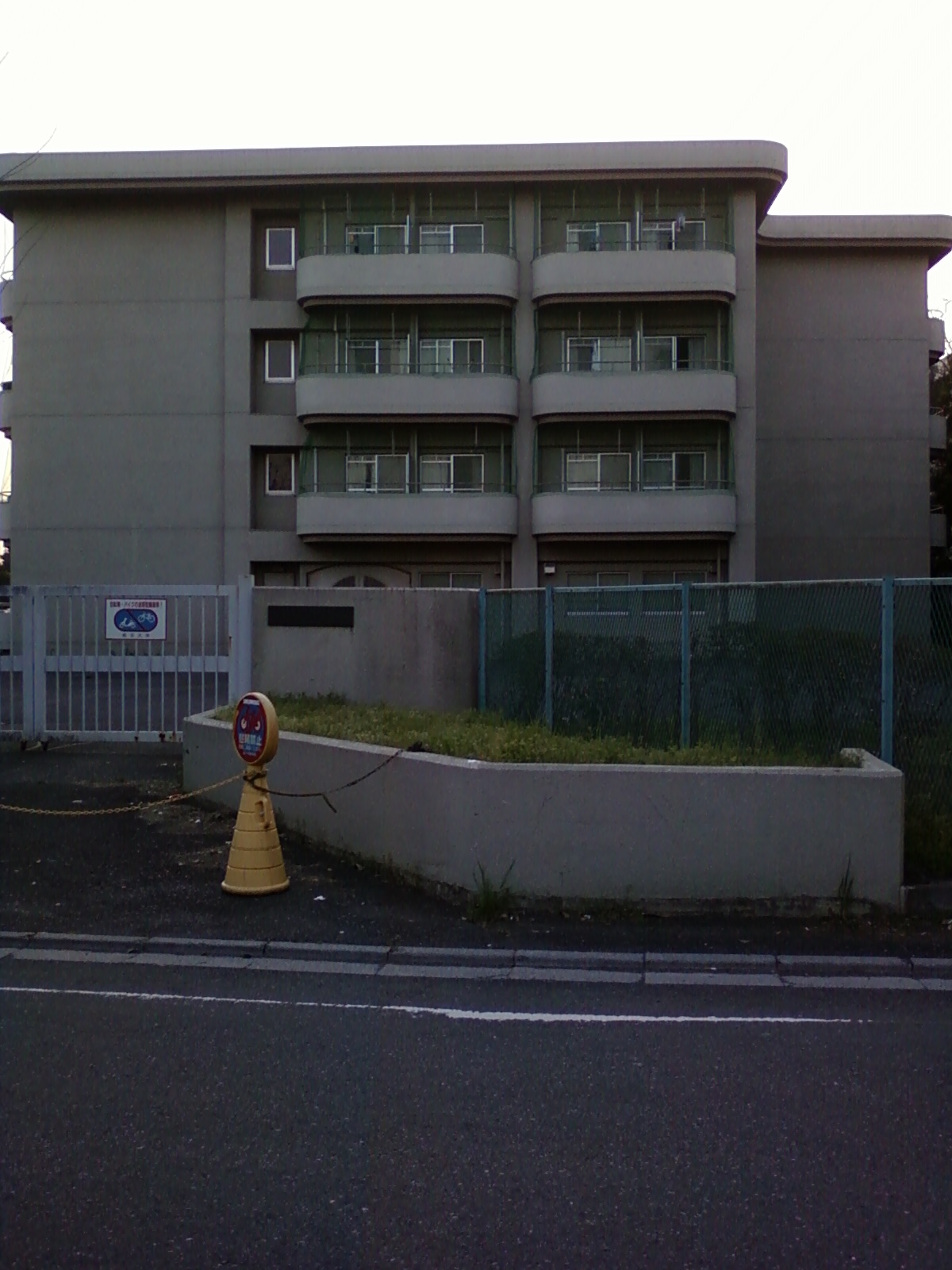
International House 2

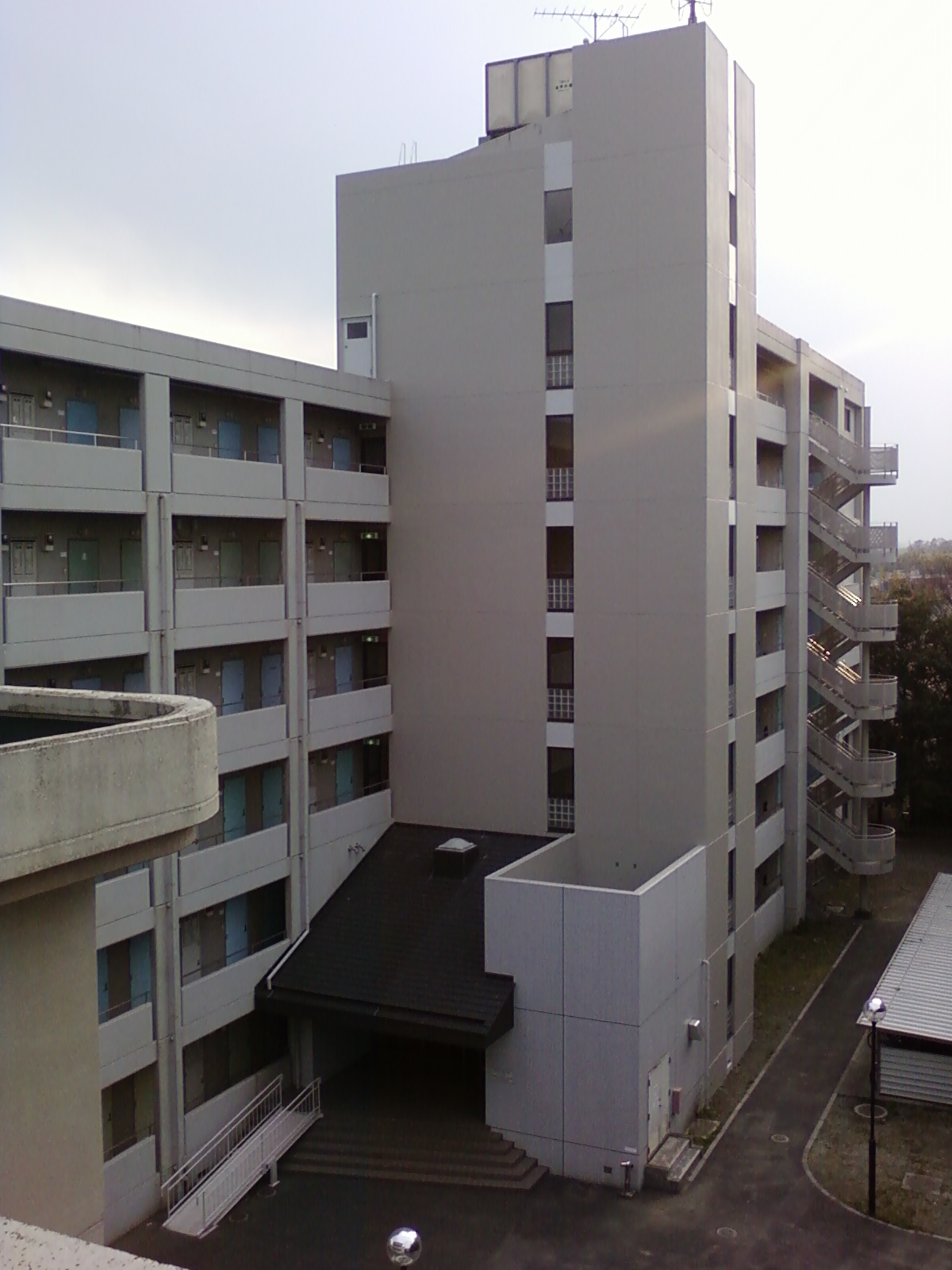
International House 3

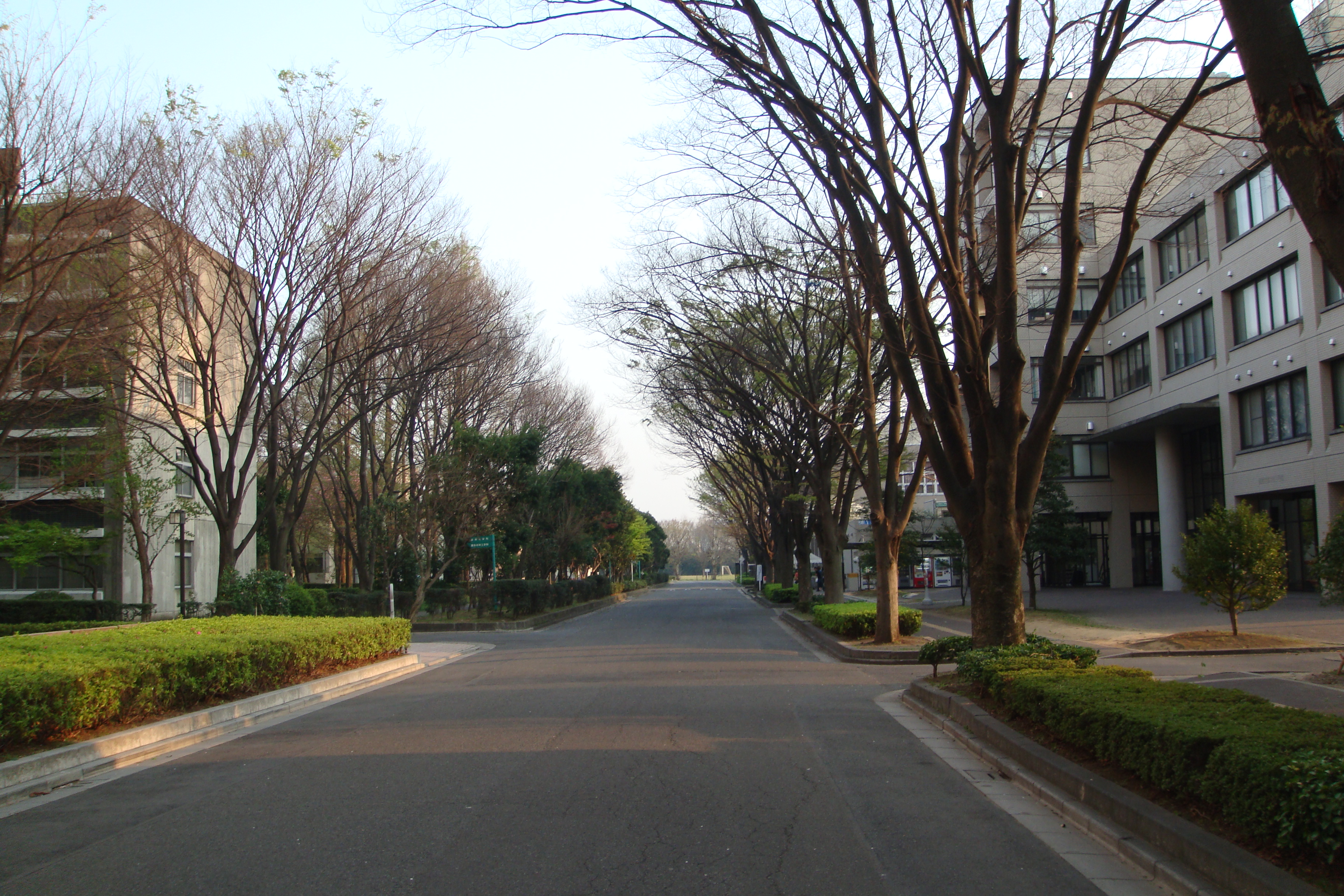
A street

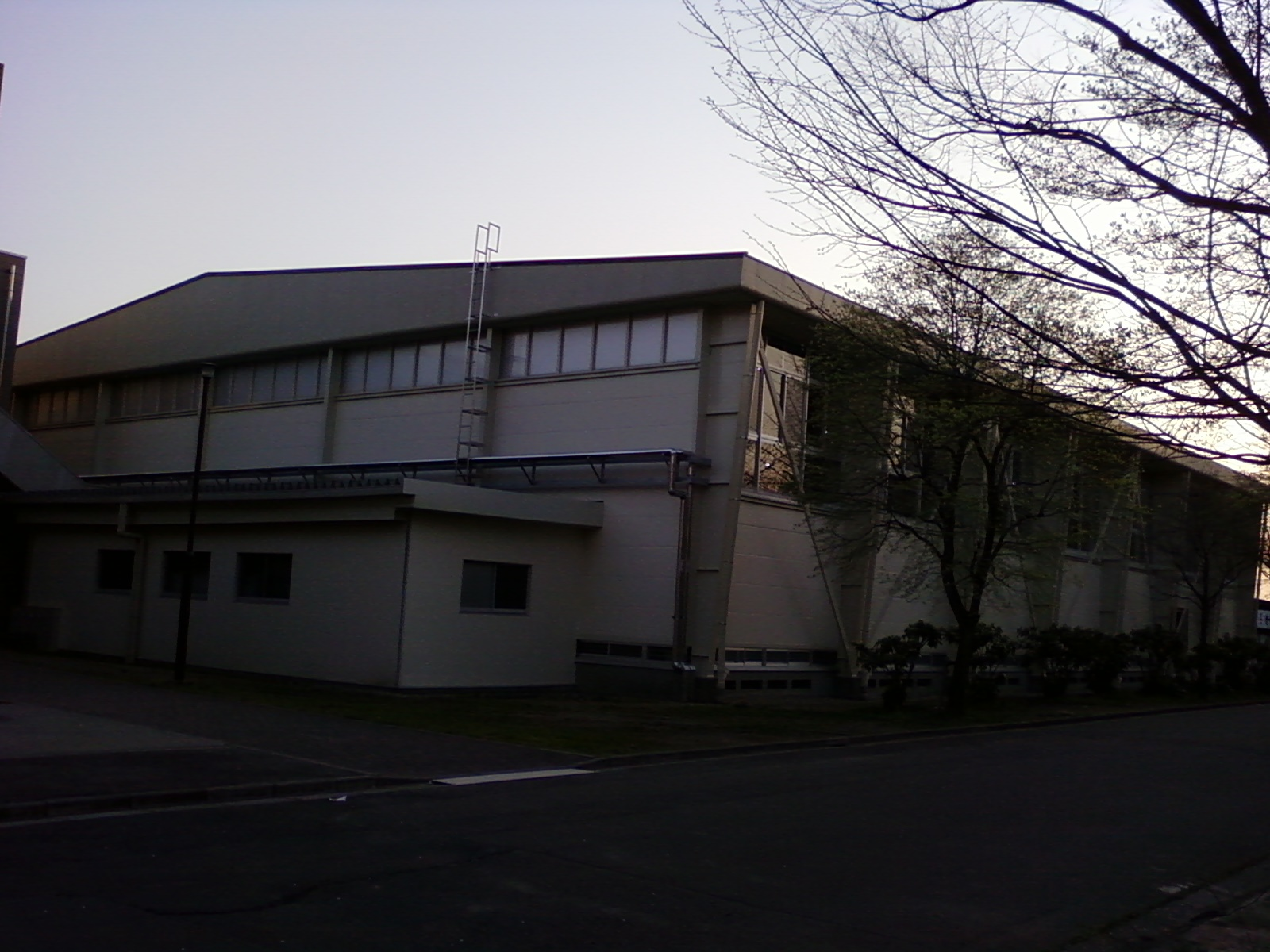
Gymnasium
