= Geresu Duki =

Dejazmach Geresu Duki (Oromo: Garasuu Dhukii; Amharic: ገረሱ ዱኪ; June 1905 – 7 June 1966) also known by his horse name Abba Borraa was one of the leaders of the resistance Arbegnoch movement against the Italians during the Italian occupation of Ethiopia.

== Biography ==
Geresu Duki was born in the town of Waliso in western Shewa in June 1905. During the Second Italo-Ethiopian War, he fought the Italians at the First Battle of Tembien, the Second Battle of Tembien and the Battle of Maychew. After the Ethiopian army was defeated, he fled to his homeland of western Shewa where by mid 1937 he began raising a force among his Oromo kinsmen. On 7 November 1937, he was responsible for a notable ambush of an Italian column at Waliso.

Geresu gained notoriety after he orchestrated the brutal murder of Sebastiano Castagna on 5 October 1938, an Italian engineer that served as a mediator between the Italian authorities and the Ethiopian guerrillas. After this, the Italian colonial government put a bounty of 50,000 lira on Geresu's head by the special order of Prince Amedeo, Duke of Aosta. Later that month, on 23 October 1938 four Groupo de Bande moved into western Shewa to capture the rebel leader. Despite suffering significant losses during the operations, Geresu managed to evade capture.

On 1 January 1939, Benito Mussolini sent a message to Prince Amedeo, Duke of Aosta telling him "We have six months before the rainy season to liquidate Abebe, Mangsha and Garassu, names which are already appearing in the European press."

Geresu would emerge again during the East African campaign, when he participated in the liberation of Jimma and then led a daring crossing of the Omo River to liberate southern Ethiopia. After the liberation of Ethiopia in 1941, Emperor Haile Selassie granted him the rank of Dejazmach and appointed him as the governor of the provinces of Arsi, Gamu-Gofa and Illubabor.

Later in life, Geresu served as a senator in the Imperial Parliament of Ethiopia. He died on 7 June 1966 and was buried in his hometown of Waliso.
