= Duchy of Cantabria =

Dukedom of Spain

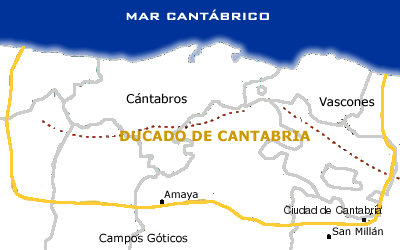
Approximate limits of the Duchy of Cantabria

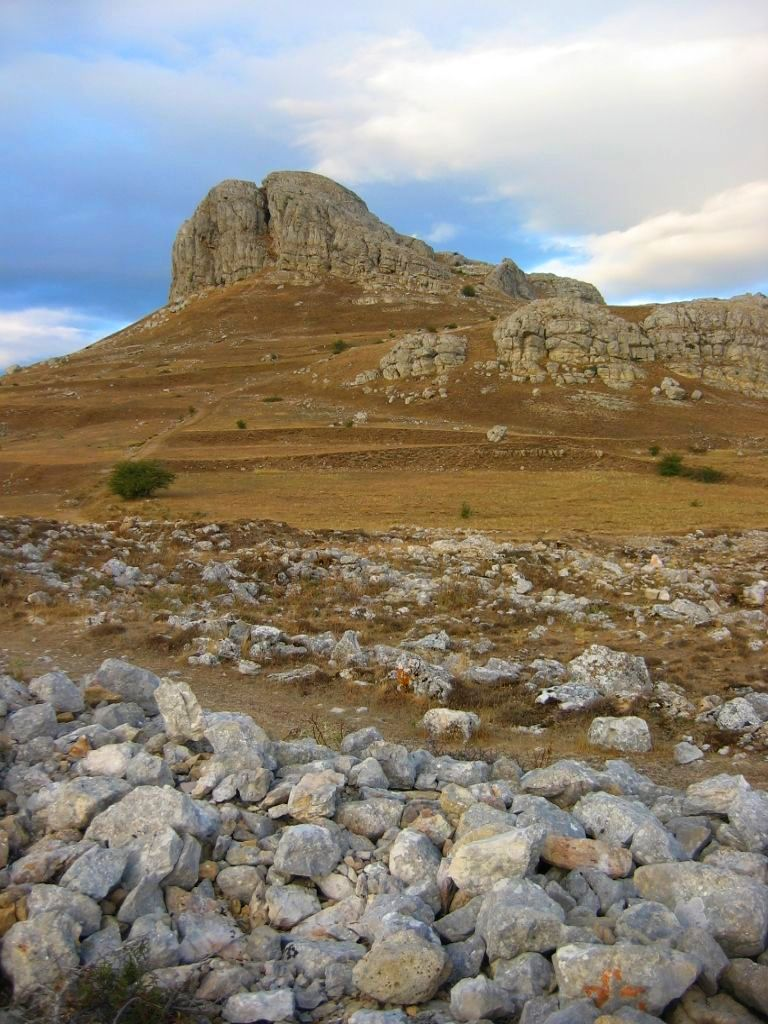
Peña Amaya, where the ancient Cantabrian town of Amaya was located. Situated on the southern end of the Duchy, looks like a forward watchtower on the Castilian countryside.

The Duchy of Cantabria was created by the Visigoths in northern Spain. Its precise extension is unclear in the different periods, but it seems likely that it included Cantabria, parts of Northern Castile, La Rioja, and probably western areas of Biscay and Álava.

The two main towns of Cantabria before its conquest by the Goths were Amaya (in northern Burgos) and the City of Cantabria, believed to have been near modern Logroño. Both towns were destroyed in 574 by Liuvigild, who massacred many of their inhabitants. The legend of this destruction remained for long in the memory of the affected peoples. Bishop Braulio of Zaragoza (631-651) wrote in his Life of St. Emilianus how the saint prophesied the destruction of Cantabria because of their alleged sins. It is held in popular belief that the converted refugees from the City of Cantabria founded the monastery of Our Lady of Codés in Navarre.

A Senate of Cantabria mentioned in the Life of St. Emilianus bears witness to a local nobility and a governing diet which may have been one of the last independent Hispano-Roman provincial authorities. Some names are provided too, such as autochthonous Sicorius or Tuentius, with no clear ethnic affiliation, and Latin names Honorius and Nepotianus.

== See also ==
- Visigoth
- Cantabri
- Cantabria
