= Minami-Yono Station =

Railway station in Saitama, Japan

JA23 Minami-Yono Station 南与野駅
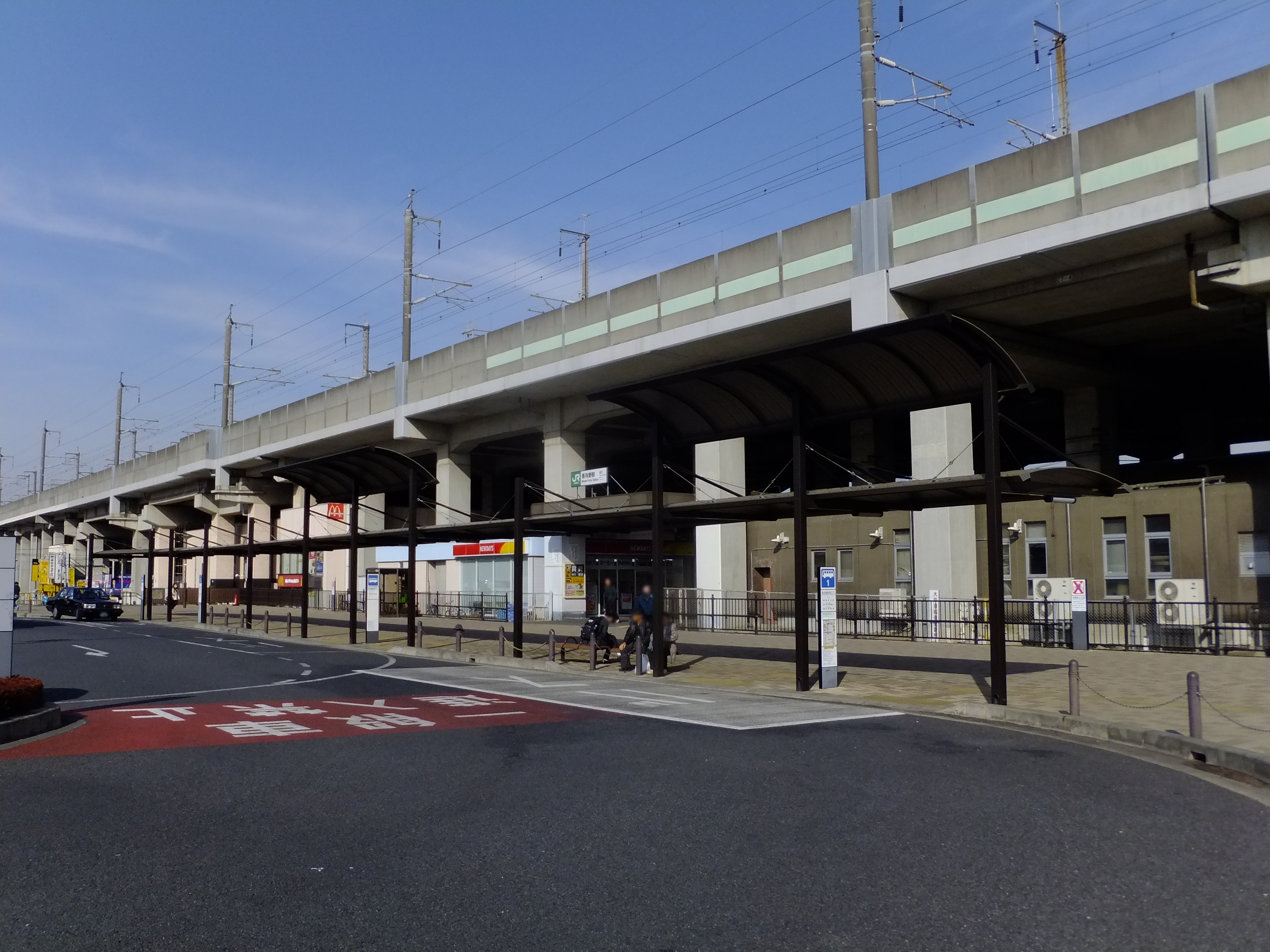
- Entrance of Minami-Yono Station in February 2015

General information
- Location: 2-547 Suzuya, Chūō-ku, Saitama-shi, Saitama-ken 338-0013; Japan
- Coordinates: 35°52′2.73″N 139°37′52.29″E
- Operator: JR East
- Line: Saikyō Line
- Distance: 19.0 km from Ikebukuro
- Platforms: 1 island platform
- Connections: Bus stop

Other information
- Status: Staffed
- Station code: JA23
- Website: Official website

History
- Opened: 30 September 1985

Passengers
- FY2019: 18,917 daily

Services
Preceding station	JR East	Following station
Naka-Urawa JA22 towards Ōsaki	Saikyō Line Rapid Local	Yonohommachi JA24 towards Ōmiya
Location
- Location within Saitama Prefecture Location within Japan

Minami-Yono Station (南与野駅, Minami-Yono-eki) is a passenger railway station on the Saikyō Line located in Chūō-ku, Saitama, Saitama Prefecture, Japan, operated by the East Japan Railway Company (JR East).

== Lines ==
Minami-Yono Station is served by the Saikyō Line which runs between Ōsaki in Tokyo and Ōmiya in Saitama Prefecture. Some trains continue northward to Kawagoe via the Kawagoe Line and southward to Shin-Kiba via the TWR Rinkai Line. The station is located 19.0 km from Ikebukuro Station. The station identification colour is "tokiwa green".

== Station layout ==
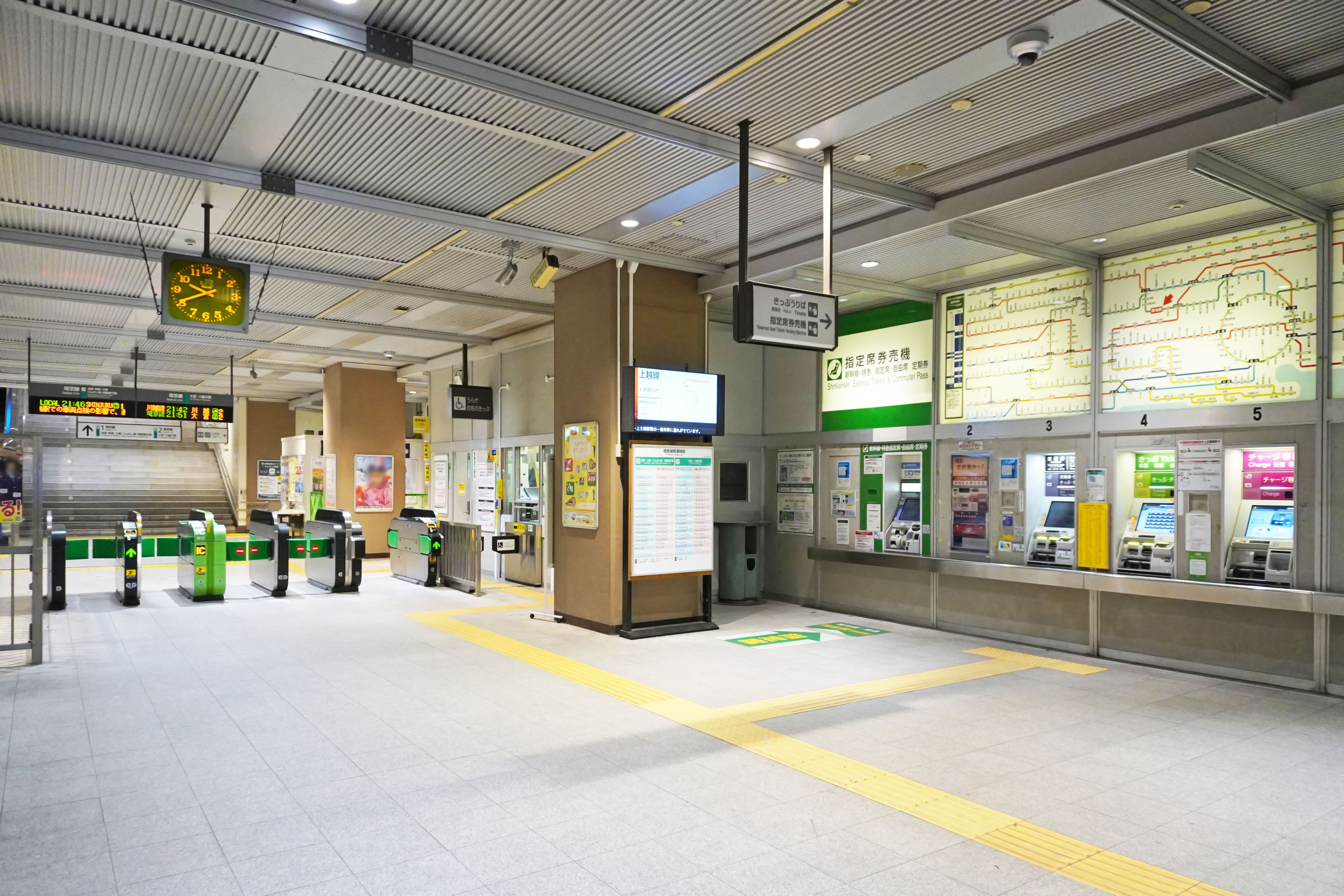
Station concourse and ticket barriers in January 2023

The station consists of one elevated island platform serving two tracks, with the station building located underneath. Additional passing tracks lie on either side of the station for non-stop rapid services. The tracks of the Tōhoku Shinkansen also run adjacent to this station, on the west side.

The station used to have a "Midori no Madoguchi" staffed ticket office, but this closed on 31 October 2007.

=== Platforms ===
1	Saikyō Line	for Musashi-Urawa, Akabane, Shinjuku and Ōsaki; Rinkai Line for Shin-Kiba
2	Saikyō Line	for Ōmiya and Kawagoe

== History ==
The station opened on 30 September 1985.

== Passenger statistics ==
In fiscal 2019, the station was used by an average of 18,917 passengers daily (boarding passengers only).

The passenger figures for previous years are as shown below.

Fiscal year	Daily average
2000	14,297
2005	14,960
2010	15,565
2015	17,046

== Surrounding area ==
- Saitama University
- National Route 463

== See also ==
- List of railway stations in Japan
