= Elu (woreda) =

Administrative division of Ethiopia

Coordinates: 8°45′N 38°20′E

Elu is one of the woredas in the Oromia Region of Ethiopia. Part of the Southwest Shewa Zone, Elu is bordered on the south by Becho, on the west by Dawo, on the north by West Shewa Zone, and on the east by the Awash which separates it from Alem Gena. Towns in Elu include Asgori and Taji.

The August 2006 floods affected Elu, causing widespread damage. In this woreda—combined with Sebata, Awas, and Ejerie woredas—14,790 persons were affected and 2,052 people displaced.

== Demographics ==
The 2007 national census reported a total population for this woreda of 61,985, of whom 31,484 were men and 30,501 were women; 7,485 or 12.08% of its population were urban dwellers. The majority of the inhabitants said they practised Ethiopian Orthodox Christianity, with 81.3% of the population reporting they observed this belief, while 16.25% of the population practiced traditional beliefs, and 1.93% were Protestant.

Based on figures published by the Central Statistical Agency in 2005, this woreda has an estimated total population of 66,758, of whom 33,273 were males and 33,485 were females; 8,596 or 12.88% of its population are urban dwellers, which is about the same as the Zone average of 12.3%. With an estimated area of 312.5 square kilometers, Elu has an estimated population density of 213.6 people per square kilometer, which is greater than the Zone average of 152.8.

The 1994 national census reported a total population for this woreda of 47,148, of whom 23,741 were men and 23,407 women; 4,812 or 10.21% of its population were urban dwellers at the time. The two largest ethnic groups reported in Elu were the Oromo (94.46%), and the Amhara (4.88%); all other ethnic groups made up 0.66% of the population. Oromiffa was spoken as a first language by 96.24%, and 3.53% spoke Amharic; the remaining 0.23% spoke all other primary languages reported. The majority of the inhabitants professed Ethiopian Orthodox Christianity, with 99.44% of the population reporting they practiced that belief. Well, but it is out of date demography of the wereda (Kebede Lemu Bekelcha)
