= Naka-Urawa Station =

Railway station in Saitama, Japan

JA22 Naka-Urawa Station 中浦和駅
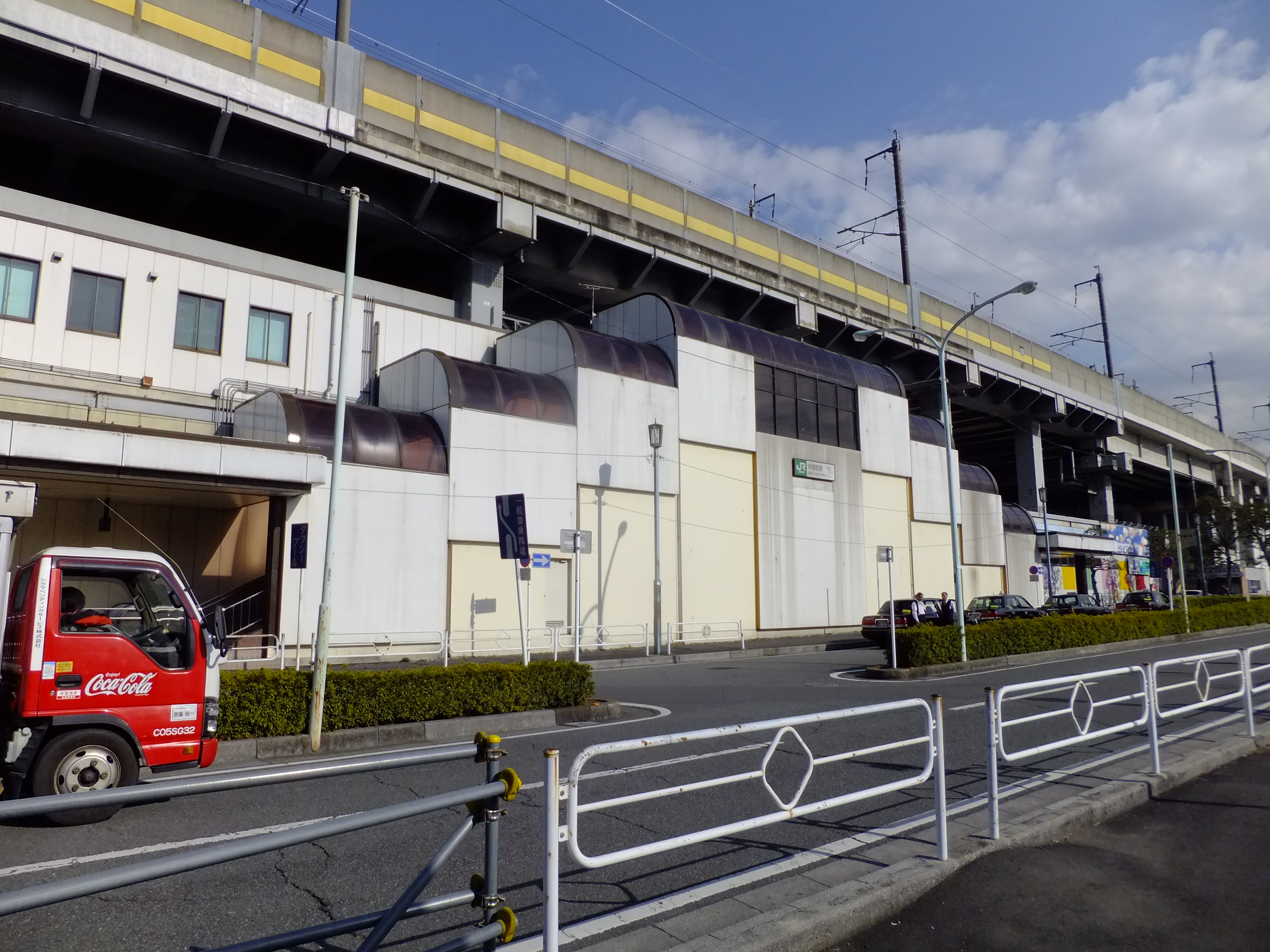
- Naka-Urawa Station west exit, February 2015

General information
- Location: 1 Shikatebukuro, Minami-ku, Saitama-shi, Saitama-ken 336-0031; Japan
- Coordinates: 35°51′13.71″N 139°38′14.79″E
- Operator: JR East
- Line: Saikyō Line
- Platforms: 1 island platform
- Connections: Bus stop

Other information
- Status: Staffed
- Website: Official website

History
- Opened: 30 September 1985

Passengers
- FY2019: 13,537 daily

Services
Preceding station	JR East	Following station
Musashi-Urawa JA21 towards Ōsaki	Saikyō Line Rapid Local	Minami-Yono JA23 towards Ōmiya
Location
- Location within Saitama Prefecture Location within Japan

Naka-Urawa Station (中浦和駅, Naka-Urawa-eki) is a passenger railway station on the Saikyō Line in Minami-ku, Saitama, Saitama Prefecture, Japan, operated by the East Japan Railway Company.

== Lines ==
Naka-Urawa Station is served by the Saikyō Line which runs between Ōsaki in Tokyo and Ōmiya in Saitama Prefecture. Some trains continue northward to Kawagoe via the Kawagoe Line and southward to Shin-Kiba via the TWR Rinkai Line. The station is located 17.3 km from Ikebukuro Station. The station identification colour is "canary yellow".

== Station layout ==
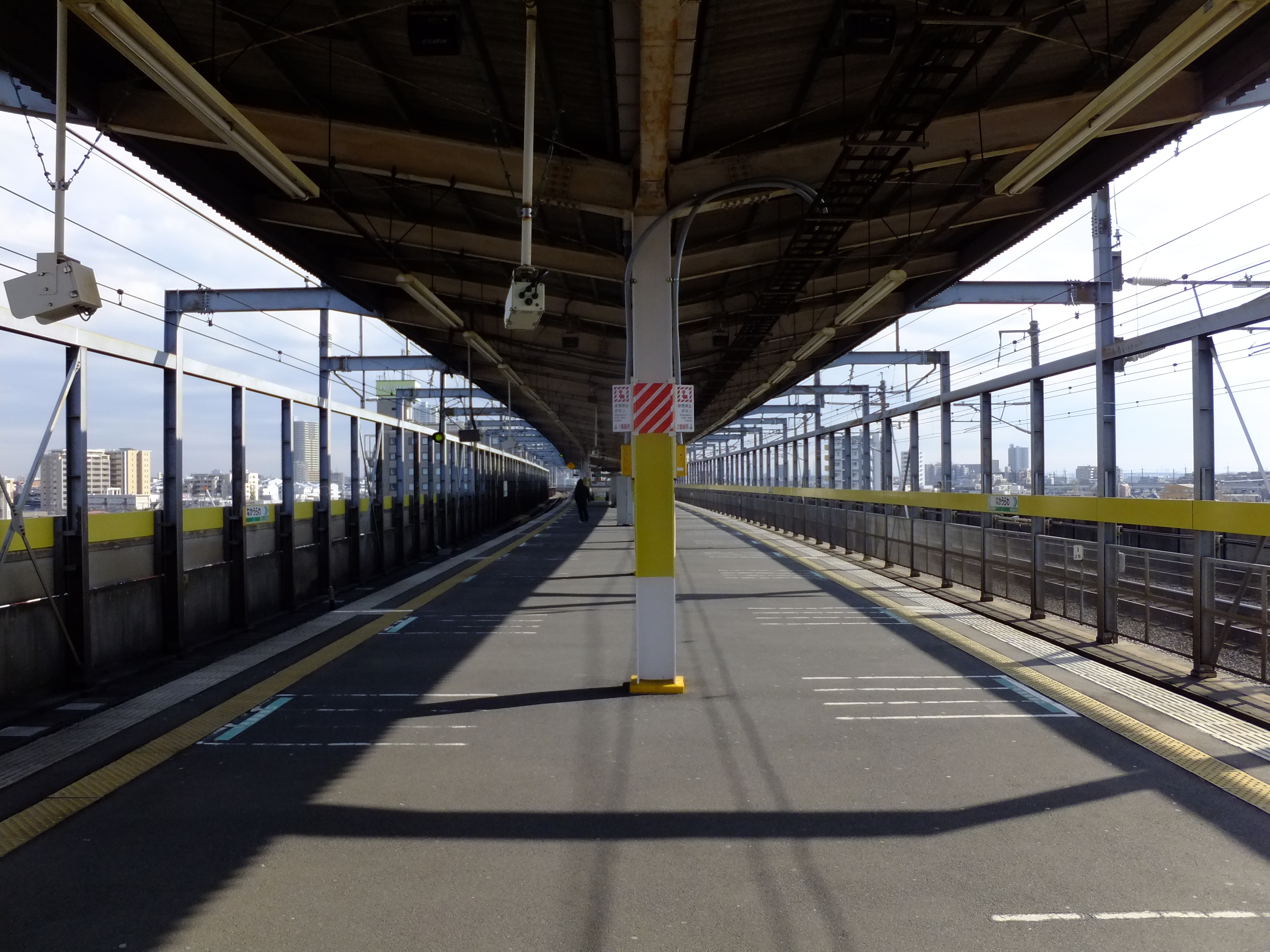
View of the platforms, February 2015

The station consists of one elevated island platform serving two tracks. The tracks of the Tōhoku Shinkansen also run adjacent to this station, on the west side. The station is staffed.

=== Platforms ===
1	Saikyō Line	for Musashi-Urawa, Akabane, Shinjuku and Ōsaki; Rinkai Line for Shin-Kiba
2	Saikyō Line	for Ōmiya and Kawagoe

== History ==
The station opened on 30 September 1985.

== Passenger statistics ==
In fiscal 2019, the station was used by an average of 13,537 passengers daily (boarding passengers only).

The passenger figures for previous years are shown below.

Fiscal year	Daily average
2000	10,778
2005	11,399
2010	12,214
2015	12,843

== Surrounding area ==
- Saitama Prefectural Government Office
- Saitama City Office
- Saitama Urawa Ward Office

== See also ==
- List of railway stations in Japan
