= Tulu Bolo =

Town in Oromia Region, Ethiopia

- Town
- Location within Ethiopia Tulu Bolo (Africa)
- Coordinates: 8°40′N 38°13′E
- Country: Ethiopia
- Region: Oromia
- Zone: Southwest Shewa
- Woreda: Becho
- Elevation: 7,195 ft (2,193 m)
- Time zone: UTC+3 (EAT)

Tulu Bolo is a city in the Oromia Region of Ethiopia. It is located about 70 kilometers south of Addis Ababa

Its name comes from the words for mountain (tulu) and sink (bolo) called Caldera in the King Aba Gifar of Jimma visited on his trip to Addis Ababa. The town contains churches and mosques.

== Demographics ==
Based on figures from the Central Statistical Agency in 2005, Tulu Bolo had an estimated population of 14,307 including 6,837 men and 7,470 women. The 1994 national census reported this town had a population of 8,011 (3,708 men, 4,303 women).

== Education ==
Schools include Hibret Firee Senior secondary school, Fitawrari Habte Giorgis school (named after a patriot in the battle of Adwoa against Italy), and Tulu Bolo elementary school. Kindergartens are available.

Hibret Firee Senior secondary school was constructed using contributions from farmers of the then Dawo, Illu, Bacho, Arbu cholule, Tole and Bussa Woredas in 1976 E.C.

== Geography ==
A natural hot spring (Tsebele) offers aesthetic and medicinal value in the eastern part of the town and for bath. It supplies potable water through pipes (oo, named after oromic word ho'a means hot water).

Seasonal river Meja passes through the outskirts of Addis Ababa Kenteri Sefer and Busa Sefer.

== Amenities ==
A sports field and other recreational sites are available in the central vicinity (Menafesha). Hotels are present.

== Economy ==
Construction is a major industry.

== History ==
The oldest part of the town was the center for a long time (Aroge Sefer and qochi sefer). It is situated near the Mazegaga and eyesus betekrstian.
