= Amiya Sen =

Amiya Sen may refer to:

- Amiya Sen (cricketer) (1925–2000), Indian cricketer
- Amiya Prosad Sen (born 1952), historian and religious scholar
