= Amiya Sen (cricketer) =

Indian cricketer (1925–2000)

Amiya Sen (July 1925 – 28 June 2000) was an Indian cricketer. He was a right-handed batsman and a right-arm medium-pace bowler who played for Bengal. He was born and died in Calcutta.

Sen made a single first-class appearance for the team, during the 1957–58 season. From the tailend, he scored five runs in the only innings in which he batted, as Bengal won the match by an innings margin.
