= Sotresgudo =

Coordinates: 42°35′N 4°10′W

- Municipality and town
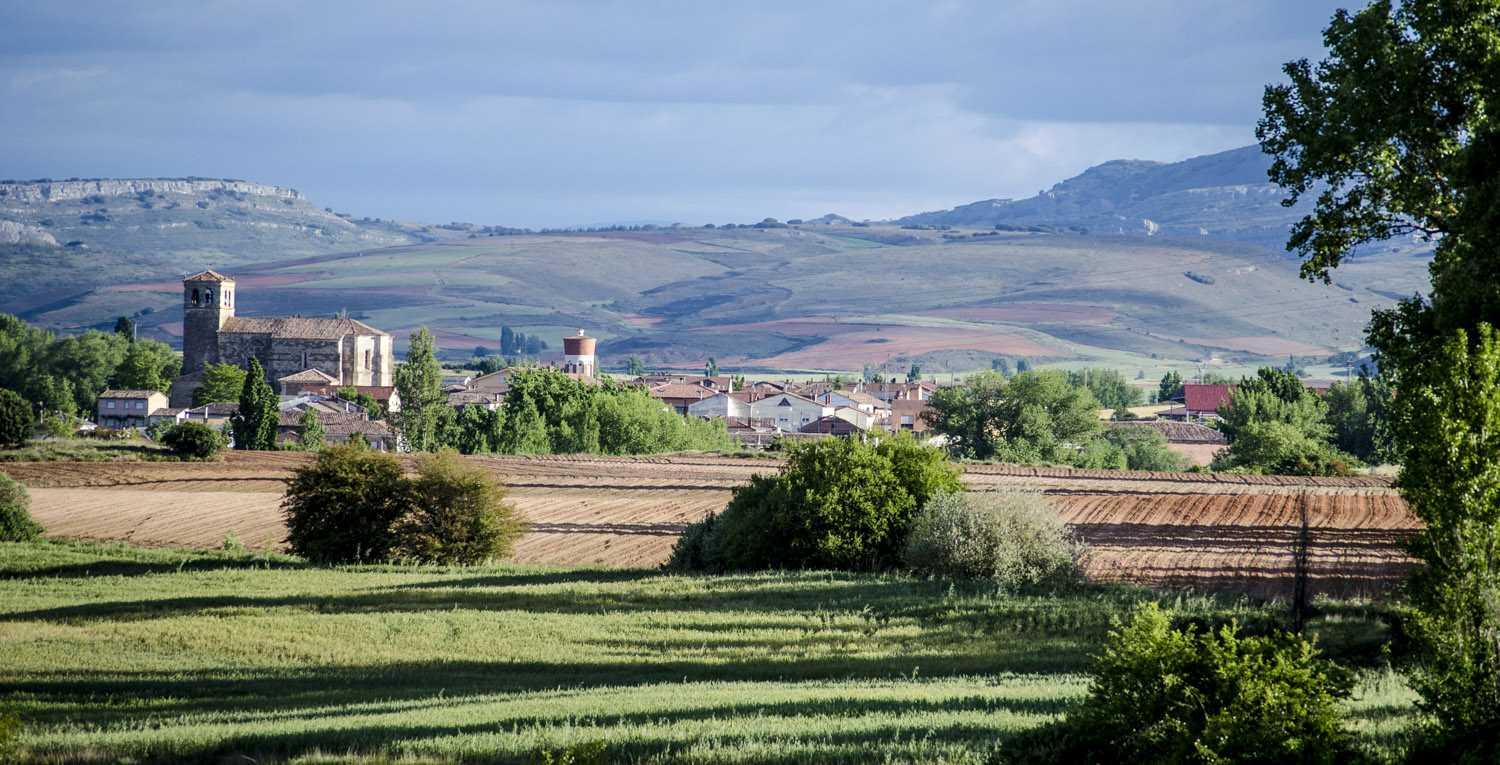
- View of Sotresgudo
- Interactive map of Sotresgudo
- Country: Spain
- Autonomous community: Castile and León
- Province: Burgos
- Comarca: Odra-Pisuerga

Area
  - Total: 172 km^{2} (66 sq mi)
- Elevation: 874 m (2,867 ft)

Population (2025-01-01)
  - Total: 413
  - Density: 2.40/km^{2} (6.22/sq mi)
- Time zone: UTC+1 (CET)
  - Summer (DST): UTC+2 (CEST)
- Postal code: 09135
- Website: http://www.sotresgudo.es/

Sotresgudo is a municipality and town located in the province of Burgos, Castile and León, Spain. According to the 2004 census (INE), the municipality has a population of 645 inhabitants.
