= Amaya =

Amaya may refer to:

== People ==
- Amaya (Spanish-language name) lists people with the Spanish given name, Amaya
- Amaya (surname) lists people with the Japanese and Spanish surname, Amaya
- Maja Keuc (born 1992), Slovenian singer known as Amaya

== Places ==
- Amaya, town in Konta Zone, Ethiopia
- Amaya (Burgos), a small village in Spain
- Amaya Creek, Santa Cruz County, California
- Amaya (restaurant), in London
- Amaya Station, Aizuwakamatsu, Fukushima Prefecture, Japan
- Amaya (woreda), a district in the Oromia Region of Ethiopia

== The arts ==
- Amaya o los vascos en el siglo VIII, a novel by Francisco Navarro-Villoslada
- Amaya (1952 film), a 1952 Spanish film
- Amaya (TV series), a period drama set in pre-Hispanic Philippines
- Hong Kong Confidential (2010 film), also known as Amaya

== Other uses ==
- Amaya (orca) (born 2014), a captive killer whale at SeaWorld San Diego
- Amaya (web editor), a WYSIWYG web authoring tool by the W3C
- Amaya Inc., an online gaming company
- Amaya Resorts & Spas, a Sri Lankan hospitality brand

== See also ==
- Amya (disambiguation)
