= Amiya Kumari Padhi =

Indian jurist (1933-2012)

Hon'ble Justice Amiya Kumari Padhi

Judge Odisha High Court
- In office 18 April 1988 – 14 September 1995

Personal details
- Born: 15 September 1933 Dhenkenal
- Died: 30 April 2012 (aged 78) Cuttack
- Citizenship: Indian
- Parent: Justice J.K Mishra (father)
- Education: Ravenshaw College
- Website: Odisha High Court Judges

Amiya Kumari Padhi (15 September 1933–30 April 2012) was an eminent Indian jurist and the first woman to serve as a judge of the Odisha High Court. She was also the Odisha High Court representative under the Indian National Security Act.

== Early life and education ==
Padhi was born in Dhenekanal, Odisha on September 15, 1933. She completed her matriculation in Sambalpur and graduated from Ravenshaw College in 1953. Padhi studied law and enrolled at the Bar in 1964. On April 18, 1988, she was elevated to judge of the Orissa High Court and retired from that position on September 14, 1995.

Padhi was the only woman judge to serve at the Orissa High Court until the appointment of Sanju Panda in February 2007. There has been a demand for 50% women reservation in Odisha judiciary as against just 4.5 per cent women representation in the court.

== Family ==
Padhi was the daughter of late Justice JK Mishra and the niece of the former Chief Justice and Governor of Odisha, Gati Krushna Mishra.

She married Shyam Sundar Padhi, a three-term (1979 to 1987) Director General of Police of Odisha, who survived her. He died on January 31, 2015, at the age of 86. Together, they had two daughters and a son.

== Death ==
Padhi died at the family residence on Bhaskosh Lane in Cuttack after prolonged ailment on April 30, 2012. Her mortal remains were consigned to flames at Satichoura crematorium.

In honor of Padhi's career and service to the judiciary of the state, all legal proceedings and office work at Odisha High Court was suspended after the news of her death was made public.

== Memberships ==
Padhi served on the Board formed under the Indian National Security Act at the Odisha High Court. She was also a member of the Ethical Committee of the Regional Medical Research Centre, Bhubaneswar.
