= Goro Kumagai =

Japanese printmaker, educator (1932–2017)

- 熊谷吾良
- Born: 1932; Hirosaki, Aomori Prefecture, Empire of Japan (now Japan)
- Died: January 24, 2017 (aged 84–85); Hirosaki, Japan
- Other names: Gorō Kumagai
- Education: Musashino Art University
- Occupation(s): Visual artist, educator, illustrator
- Known for: Woodcuts

Goro Kumagai (Japanese: 熊谷吾良; 1932 – 2017) was a Japanese visual artist and educator. He is known for traditional Japanese woodcut prints. Kumagai taught woodblock printing for many years at Saitama University in Saitama City, Japan.

== Biography ==
Kumagai was born in 1932, in Hirosaki, Aomori Prefecture, Empire of Japan. He graduated in 1956 from the department of Western painting at the Musashino Art University in Kodaira, Japan.

Kumagai taught woodblock printing at Saitama University, from 1961 until 1998. He was a member of the Japan Print Association, from 1961 until 1971; and a member of the Kokugakai (the National Painting Association) starting in 1963. In 1964, he exhibited at the 4th Tokyo International Print Biennale. In 2016, Kumagai illustrated a Japanese book of essays cover, "How to Find the Best Hirosaki" (2016) by faculty members of Hirosaki Gakuin University.

Kumagai's artwork is in museum collections, including at in the Art Institute of Chicago; the Philadelphia Museum of Art; the Minneapolis Institute of Art; the Art Gallery of Greater Victoria in Victoria, Canada; the National Museum of Asian Art in Washington, D.C.; and the National Gallery of Art in Washington, D.C..
