= Seden Sodo =

District in Oromia Region, Ethiopia

Coordinates: 8°25′N 38°15′E

Seden Sodo is one of the woredas in Oromia Region, Ethiopia. it is bordered on the Southern Nations, Nationalities and Peoples Region, Gedebeno Gutezer Wereda or Gurage zone on the west by weliso, by north by Bacho wereda on the northeast by Tole wereda, and on the east by Kersa Malima. The major town in Seden Sodo is Harbu Chulule.

== Demographics ==
The 2007 national census reported a total population for this woreda of 69,215, of whom 34,731 were men and 34,484 were women; 2,947 or 4.26% of its population were urban dwellers. The majority of the inhabitants said they practised Ethiopian Orthodox Christianity, with 80.69% of the population reporting they observed this belief, while 16.74% of the population were Muslim, and 2.43% were Protestant.

Based on figures published by the Central Statistical Agency in 2005, this woreda has an estimated total population of 77,418, of whom 39,183 are men and 38,235 are women; 1,913 or 2.47% of its population are urban dwellers, which is less than the Zone average of 12.3%. With an estimated area of 491.88 square kilometers, Kokir has an estimated population density of 157.4 people per square kilometer, which is greater than the Zone average of 152.8.

The 1994 national census reported a total population for this woreda of 56,027, of whom 27,844 were men and 28,183 women; 1,073 or 1.92% of its population were urban dwellers at the time. The three largest ethnic groups reported in Kokir were the Gurage (95.86%), the Siltʼe (1.99%), and the Oromo (1.61%); all other ethnic groups made up 0.54% of the population. Oromo was spoken as a first language by 59.03%, 23.04% spoke Siltʼe, and 17.29% spoke Soddo; the remaining 0.64% spoke all other primary languages reported. The majority of the inhabitants professed Ethiopian Orthodox Christianity, with 80.43% of the population reporting they practiced that belief, while 18.8% of the population said they were Muslim.
