= Amya, Dawei =

Amya
- Village
- Location in Burma
- Coordinates: 13°49′N 99°0′E
- Country: Burma
- Region: Taninthayi Region
- District: Dawei District
- Township: Dawei Township
- Elevation: 126 m (415 ft)
- Time zone: UTC+6.30 (MST)

Amya is a village of Dawei District in the Taninthayi Division of Myanmar.

== Geography ==
It is located by the Tenasserim River on the western side of the Tenasserim Range near the border with Thailand.
