= Amyas =

Amyas is a surname and male forename thought to be derived either from the Latin verb amare or the French city of Amiens.

== People ==
- Sir Amyas Bampfylde (1560–1626), English politician and member of Parliament for Devon in 1597
- Amyas Borton (1886–1969), British air marshal
- Amyas Connell (1901–1980), New Zealand architect
- Amyas Godfrey, Canadian actor and British Army officer
- Sir Amyas Morse, British auditor, comptroller and auditor general of the National Audit Office
- Amyas Northcote (1864–1923), English writer
- Amias Paulet (1532–1588), English diplomat
- Amyas Preston (died 1609), English privateer

== In literature ==
- Amyas Burdett, architect and love interest in Call Dr. Margaret by Ray Dorien
- Amyas Crale, artist and victim of murder in Agatha Christie's crime-novel Five Little Pigs AKA Murder in Retrospect
- Amyas Leigh, protagonist in Westward Ho! by Charles Kingsley
- Amyas le Poulet, nicknamed Clarence, character in A Connecticut Yankee in King Arthur's Court by Mark Twain
