= Amiya Pujari =

Indian computer scientist

Dr. Amiya Kumar Pujari
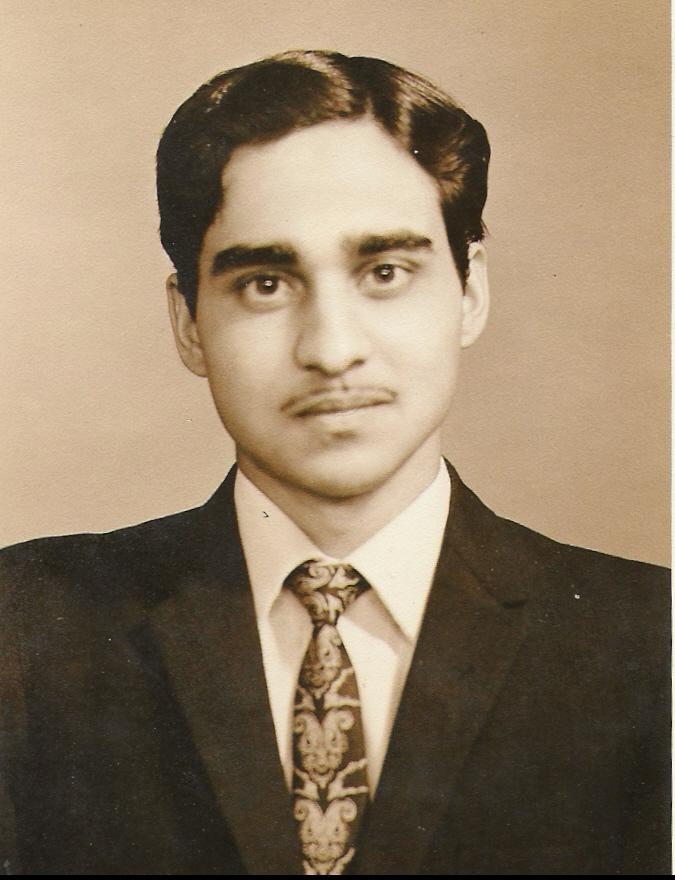
- Born: 19 June 1948; Sambalpur, Odisha
- Died: 4 March 2003 (aged 54); Pattaya, Thailand
- Education: Indian Institute of Science, Bangalore, Indian Institute of Technology, Bombay
- Known for: Computer Science and IT education in India
- Spouse: Nirupa Pujari
- Children: Ashis Kumar Pujari; Ashpruha Pujari

Amiya Kumar Pujari (19 June 1948 – 4 March 2003) was an Indian computer scientist and information technology pioneer and leader.

== Early life ==
Pujari was born into an Oriya Brahmin family in Sambalpur, India. He took an interest in science, mathematics and engineering from very early on in his life.

== Career ==
Pujari was a leading information technology pioneer in the states of Kerala and Odisha where he made significant contributions in e-governance and other computer science research. He dedicated most of his life to spreading computer and technology education in Indian society and government.

List of positions held :

1997–2003	Chief Executive Officer, Odisha Computer Application Centre, Bhubaneswar
1990–1997	Head of Department, University of Kerala, Trivandrum
1986–1990	General Manager, Odisha Computer Application Centre, Bhubaneswar
1977–1986	Head of Computer Centre & Director, Dept. of Computer Science, University of Kerala, Trivandrum
1972–1977	Technical Officer, Electronics Corporation of India

== Accomplishments ==
=== As Director Computer Centre, University of Kerala (August 1990 - 1997) ===
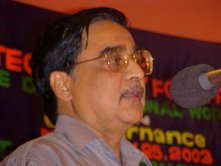
Dr. Pujari giving a talk

- Co-ordination of computer related activities in computer applications in all departments of the university including computerization of research projects, administrative applications and office automation,
- Chairman of Board of Studies in Computer Science in the University of Kerala for the period 1992-Jan 1995.
- Chairman/member of Doctoral Committee in Computer Science in the University of Kerala,
- Member of the Board of studies in Electronics, University of Kerala - 1994,
- Member of the Board of studies in Computer Science, Bharathiar University, Coimbatore - 1993,
- Member of the Board of studies in Computer Applications, Institute of Management in Government, Government of Kerala, Trivandrum,
- Guest Faculty member in the Institute of Management in Kerala. Department of Future Studies and Academic Staff College in the University of Kerala. Organized and taught self-financed courses in the Computer Centre,
- Member/Chairman of Board of examiners for examinations in Computer Science, Future Studies and other engineering subjects in the University of Kerala and University of Calicut, University of Jodhpur and Utkal University,
- Served as PhD and MTech, theses examiner of the Jawaharlal Nehru University, New Delhi,
- Guided six PhD students (in Applied Science faculty and Engineering faculty) and two students for MSc (Eng) by research,
- Served as expert member in the inspection commission of the Kerala University for granting affiliation to new course in college,
- Served in expert committees for inspection of academic institutions in the country formed by the UGC and AICTE.

=== As General Manager, OCAC (August 1986 - July 1990) ===
- Led the technical activities OCAC, in all aspects of computerization, including consultancy, hardware installation, software development, training in many government departments and public sector undertakings in Odisha,
- Associated with several universities, educational institutions and academic centers including:
  - Member of Board of Studies in Electronics and Computer Applications, Sambalpur University,
  - Member of the advisory board for Computer Science in the College of Engineering and Technology, OUAT, Odisha
  - Member of Committee for vocational courses (Computer Technology) SCERT, Odisha,
  - Member of sectoral panel (Physical sciences) of the State Council on Science and Technology, Government of Odisha,
  - Guest faculty member in the Odisha University of Agricultural and Technology, Gopabandhu Academy of Administration, Bhubaneswar,
  - Computer Counsellor in the Indira Gandhi National Open University, Bhubaneswar Centre,
  - External guide for two MTech theses submitted at IIT, Kharagpur.

=== As Head, Computer Centre and Director, Department of Computer Science, University of Kerala (March 1977 - July 1986) ===
- Responsible for the establishment and management of a new department of computer centre and undertook consultancy, system design and program development for the users belonging to the university, government departments and industries in Kerala,
- Taught computer related subjects in university departments,
- Guest faculty member in institutions including Institute of Management in Government, Institute of Engineers, LBS Centre, Computer Society of India etc.,
- Organised a new teaching department of Computer Science and taught the PGDCA students (as Director of the Computer Science Department (1985–86)).

=== As Technical Officer in Computer Division of ECIL (March 1972 - March 1977) ===
- Design and development of the first indigenously developed 3rd generation computer TDC - 316 and 4th generation computer MICRO 78 in the country as a member of the design team for these computers,
- Real time software development of a micro computer based data logger,
- In-charge of a dual real time computer system integration and testing for the Fast Breeder Test Reactor project of BARC, Bombay,
- In-house customer training on computer applications,
- Feasibility studies and project implementation of computer based projects for many user organisations.

== Other positions held ==
- Item writer as well as an expert member to select items for inclusion in the Question Bank in Computer Science, of the Association of Indian Universities, New Delhi,
- Roster of specialists in the EXPERTBASE project of the Technology Information forecasting and Assessment Council (TIFAC) of the Department of Science and Technology, New Delhi,
- Proctor of the DoE-ACC accreditation scheme of the Department of Electronics, Government of India,
- Member of Advisory Committee for the software training and Development Centre of ER&DC, Thiruvananthapuram,
- Member of the expert committee for computer training, Shramik Vidyapeeth, Thiruvananthapuram,
- External expert for job and promotions interviews at organisations including VSSC, IHRD, Directorate of Tech. Education, LBS Centre, University of Kerala, University of Cochin, Centre for Development Studies, Trivandrum etc.

== Honours ==
- Dr. A. K. Pujari Award at CIT.

The Amiya K. Pujari Award is given for the best paper of the CIT conference held each year. The Conference on Information Technology is an international conference and forum for research in the area of Information Technology.

- Dr. A. K. Pujari Scholarship for best student in Science at DAV College Titilagarh

== Education ==
1989	PhD in Computer Science and Engg., Indian Institute of Technology, Bombay
1981	MTech Courses in Computer Science and Engg., Indian Institute of Technology, Bombay
1971	Bachelor or Engineering (First Class), Indian Institute of Science, Bangalore
1968	BSc Physics (First, Hons. with distinction.), Ravenshaw College, Cuttack, Odisha
1966	1st Yr. Degree (First), GM College, Sambalpur, Odisha
1965	P.U. Science (First), GM College, Sambalpur, Odisha
1964	H.S.C (First), Titlagarh High School, Odisha

== Research and publications ==
- Pujari A.K.: Successful computerization - A few guidelines and an appreciation; International Seminar on Computer Application in Industry and Management, University of Patras, Greece, 1979
- Pujari A.K., S.L. Mehndiratta: An evolutionary and adaptive database management system based on an integrated knowledge based data dictionary approach, 3rd joint BCS/ACM symposium, July 1984, University of Cambridge, U. K. (Presented in poster session)
- Pujari A.K., S.L. Mehndiratta: Architecture of an expert database management system, Proceeding of International Conference R I A O - 85, March 1985, Grenoble, France.
- Pujari A.K., S.L. Mehndiratta: A unified approach to database system specification and representation, Third International workshop on Software Specification and design, August 1985, U.K.
- Pujari A.K., S.L. Mehndiratta: Knowledge Engineering in the context of a large personnel database system, INFORMATICS - 85, International seminar, November 1985, Trivandrum.
- Pujari A.K., S.L. Mehndiratta: A unified approach to database system specification and design, Fourth International Workshop on software Specification and Design, April 1987, California, U.S.A., (Position paper selected for participation).
- Nayak M.R., Pujari A.K.: An expert Agricultural Planning And Decision System Proc. Of the Int. Conf. On Expert Systems for Development, March 1989, Kathmandu, Nepal.
- Pujari A.K., B. Murali Mohan, Dilip Kumar: A micro computer based general purpose data logger, Proceedings of the All India Seminar on Data Loggers and Signal Conditioners, February 1977, National Aeronautical Laboratory, Bangalore.
- Pujari A.K.: A report on the computer utilization in scientific field at the University of Kerala; Proceeding of seminar on Scientific Computer System, September 1977, Kurukshetra University
- Pujari A.K.: Computers and its applications, University Herald, July 1987, Kerala University, Trivandrum.
- Pujari A.K.: Trends in computer applications, CSI, Trivandrum Chapter Convention, April 1979, Trivandrum.
- Pujari A.K.: Directions of Research in computer Technology, (Radio talk broadcast on 20.11.82 from AIR, Trivandrum); Published in the CSI - Newsletter, 1983, Trivandrum Chapter.
- Pujari A.K.: Data Semantics and conceptual schema in Database Management System, Proc. Of the annual convention of the Computer Society of India, CSI-84, March, 1984, Hyderabad.
- Pujari A.K.: Prospects of growth in Computer software Industry, National Seminar on Scope for Industrial Growth in Odisha, November 1986, Bhubaneswar.
- Pujari A.K.: The KDDEN Expert System Shell, Proc. Of the seminar on AI and Expert Systems, conducted by M/s M. N. Dastur & Co. Ltd., 15–18 November 1989, Calcutta.
- Pujari A.K.: Computer and Education - a stimulus paper and call for participation in COMED 91, CSI Communication, February 1991, Bombay.
- Pujari A.K.: Computer and Education - an Overview, National Seminar on Computer and Education (COMED 91), Computer Society of India, May 1991, Trivandrum.
- Pujari A.K.: An introduction to Multimedia Technology, National Seminar on Multimedia '93. April 1993, Trivandrum.
- Pujari A.K., MIS Education - IT Perspective, Fifth Annual Management Education Convention, August 1993, Trivandrum.
- Pujari A.K., Ajith Kumar N.K. - Object Oriented LAN Design, National Conf. In software Engg. SOFTEN - December 93, IEEE Kerala Section, Trivandrum.
- N. K. Ajith Kumar, A.K. Pujari - Design Issues in communication Gateways, National Conference on Computer and Communication, May 1994, IETE Kerala Section, Trivandrum.
- V.N. Neelakandan, A.K. Pujari - A knowledge based Flood Control Information System, National Symposium on Geographic Information System, Jointly organized by the University of Madras and University of Waterloo, February 1995, Madras.
- Pujari A.K., Trends in Intelligent Information Systems, Seminar on Computer Aided Management, Society of R&D Managers, June 1995, Trivandrum.
- Pujari A.K., Tripathy P. K.:Oriya Design Guide, GiswaBharat@tdil ISSN 0972-6454 (5), Department of Information Technology, Govt. of India.

Government offices
Preceded by {{{before}}}	Odisha IT Leader	Succeeded by {{{after}}}
