= Amaya (woreda) =

District in Oromia Region, Ethiopia

Coordinates: 8°30′N 37°45′E

Amaya is one of the woredas in the Oromia Region of Ethiopia. Part of the Southwest Shewa Zone, Amaya is bordered on the south by the Southern Nations, Nationalities and Peoples Region, on the west and north by West Shewa Zone, on the northeast by Wonchi, and on the east by Wonchi and Goro. The major town in Amaya is Gindo.

Although coffee is an important cash crop of this woreda, less than 20 square kilometers are planted with this crop.

== Demographics ==
The 2007 national census reported a total population for this woreda of 122,056, of whom 61,578 were men and 60,478 were women; 6,257 or 5.13% of its population were urban dwellers. The majority of the inhabitants said they practised Ethiopian Orthodox Christianity, with 55.4% of the population reporting they observed this belief, while 26.33% of the population were Protestant, and 17.66% were Muslim.

Based on figures published by the Central Statistical Agency in 2005, this woreda has an estimated total population of 121,530, of whom 61,668 were males and 59,862 were females; 5,228 or 4.30% of its population are urban dwellers, which is less than the Zone average of 12.3%. With an estimated area of 945.47 square kilometers, Amaya has an estimated population density of 128.5 people per square kilometer, which is less than the Zone average of 152.8.

The 1994 national census reported a total population for this woreda of 87,579, of whom 43,404 were men and 44,175 women; 2,933 or 3.35% of its population were urban dwellers at the time. The three largest ethnic groups reported in Amaya were the Oromo (85.4%), the Amhara (12.71%), and the Sebat Bet Gurage (0.93%); all other ethnic groups made up 0.96% of the population. Oromiffa was spoken as a first language by 87.56%, 11.37% spoke Amharic, and 0.59% Sebat Bet Gurage; the remaining 0.48% spoke all other primary languages reported. The majority of the inhabitants professed Ethiopian Orthodox Christianity, with 77.17% of the population reporting they practiced that belief, while 18.12% of the population said they were Muslim, and 4.29% were Protestant.
