= Gorō Nakamura =

Japanese photographer (born 1940)

Gorō Nakamura (中村 梧郎, Nakamura Gorō; born December 8, 1940) is a Japanese photographer.

== See also ==
- List of Japanese photographers
- Photography in Japan
