= Amiya Patra =

Indian politician

Amiya Patra is an Indian politician belonging to Communist Party of India (Marxist). He was elected to West Bengal Legislative Assembly in 1987 and 1991 from Taldangra Assembly constituency. He is a member of Central Committee of CPI(M) since 22 April 2018.
