= Koysha Dam =

Gravity dam on the Omo River in Ethiopia

Koysha Hydroelectric Power
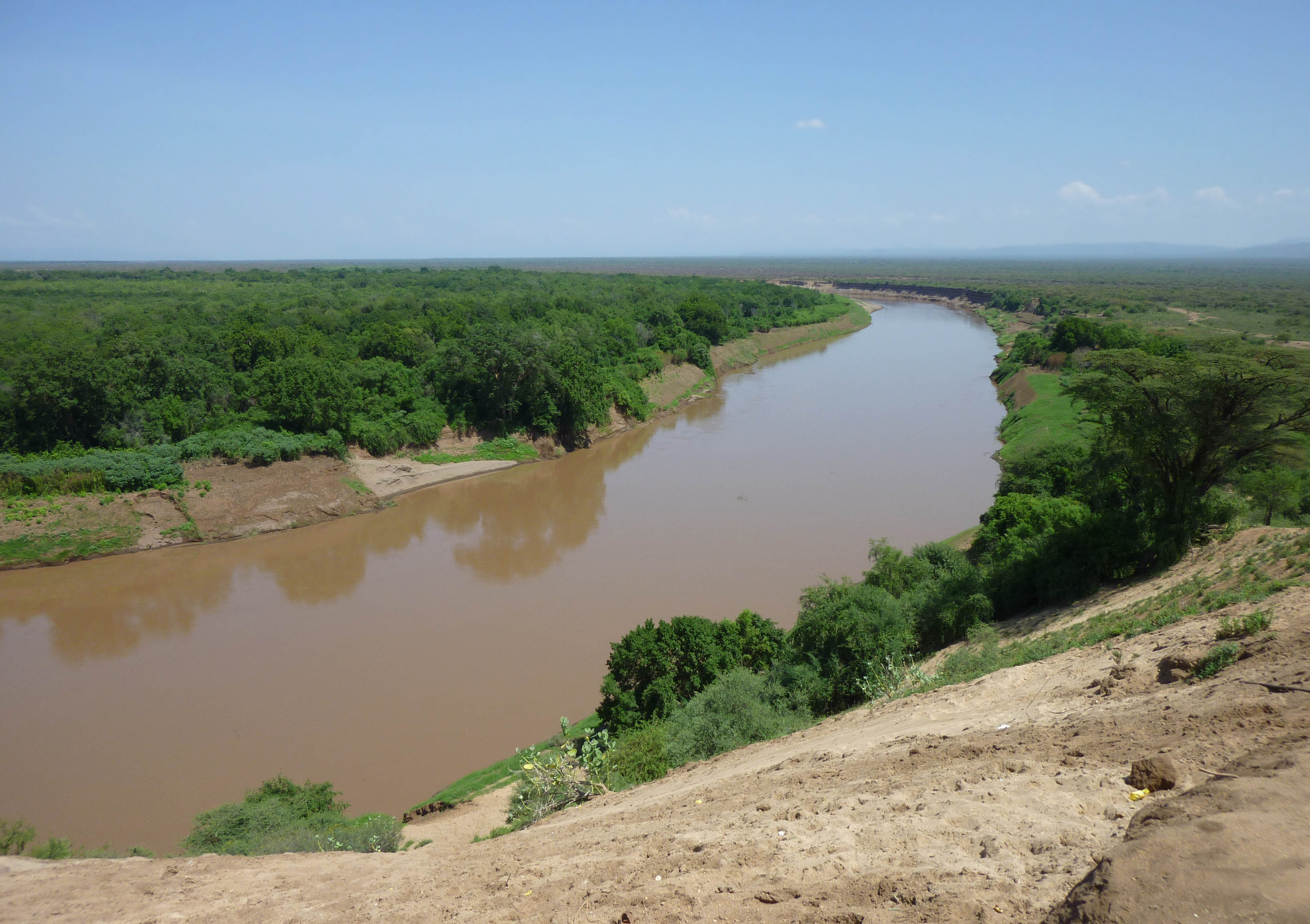
- Omo River in southwestern Ethiopia where the dam construction takes place
- Interactive map of Koysha Hydroelectric Power
- Country: Ethiopia
- Location: Omo River, South West Ethiopia Peoples' Region
- Coordinates: 6.578°N 36.550°E
- Status: Under construction
- Construction began: 28 March 2016
- Construction cost: $2.80 billion
- Owner: Ethiopian Electric Power

Dam and spillways
- Type of dam: Roller-compacted concrete
- Height (foundation): 180 m
- Length: 990 m
- Spillways: 6
- Spillway type: Gated
- Spillway capacity: 13100 m^{3}/s

Reservoir
- Total capacity: 9×10^{9} m^{3}
- Surface area: 200 km^{2}
- Maximum length: 130 km

Power Station
- Turbines: 8
- Installed capacity: 2.16 GW

Koysha Dam is a hydroelectric gravity dam that has been under construction since 2016 on the Omo River in South West Ethiopia Peoples' Region. Owned by Ethiopian Electric Power (EEP), the dam will produce up to 6460 GWh of electricity per year. In May 2016, the Italian firm Salini Impregilo contracted with EEP to build the dam, which will be 180 m high and made of rolled-compacted concrete (RCC). The reservoir volume will be 9×10^{9} m^{3}. Once completed, the dam will be the second-largest dam in Ethiopia after the Grand Ethiopian Renaissance Dam (GERD).

== Construction ==
According to the Project Deputy Manager Abayneh Getnet, the dam reached 60% completion in September 2023 and was expected to generate 1,800MW using six turbines. Getnet added that after completion of the project, an artificial lake 130 km long covering an area of 200 km^{2} be created. Addis Fortune reported in 2024 that the dam construction was postponed in several occasions due to recurrent forex crisis in the country.

In October 2025, officials announced that the project reached a height of 128 meters, with 70% of the civil works completed.
