= Waliso =

Town in Oromia Region, Ethiopia

Waliso ወሊሶ
- Town
- Location within Ethiopia
- Coordinates: 8°32′N 37°58′E
- Country: Ethiopia
- Region: Oromia
- Zone: Southwest Shewa
- Elevation: 2,063 m (6,768 ft)

Population (2007)
  - Total: 37,878
- Time zone: UTC+3 (EAT)

Waliso (Amharic: ወሊሶ) (Oromo: Walisoo) is a town in Southwest Shewa Zone of the Oromia Region in Ethiopia, 114 km southwest of Addis Ababa, it has a latitude and longitude of 8°32′N 37°58′E with an elevation of 2063 meters above sea level. Waliso is the administrative center of this Zone.

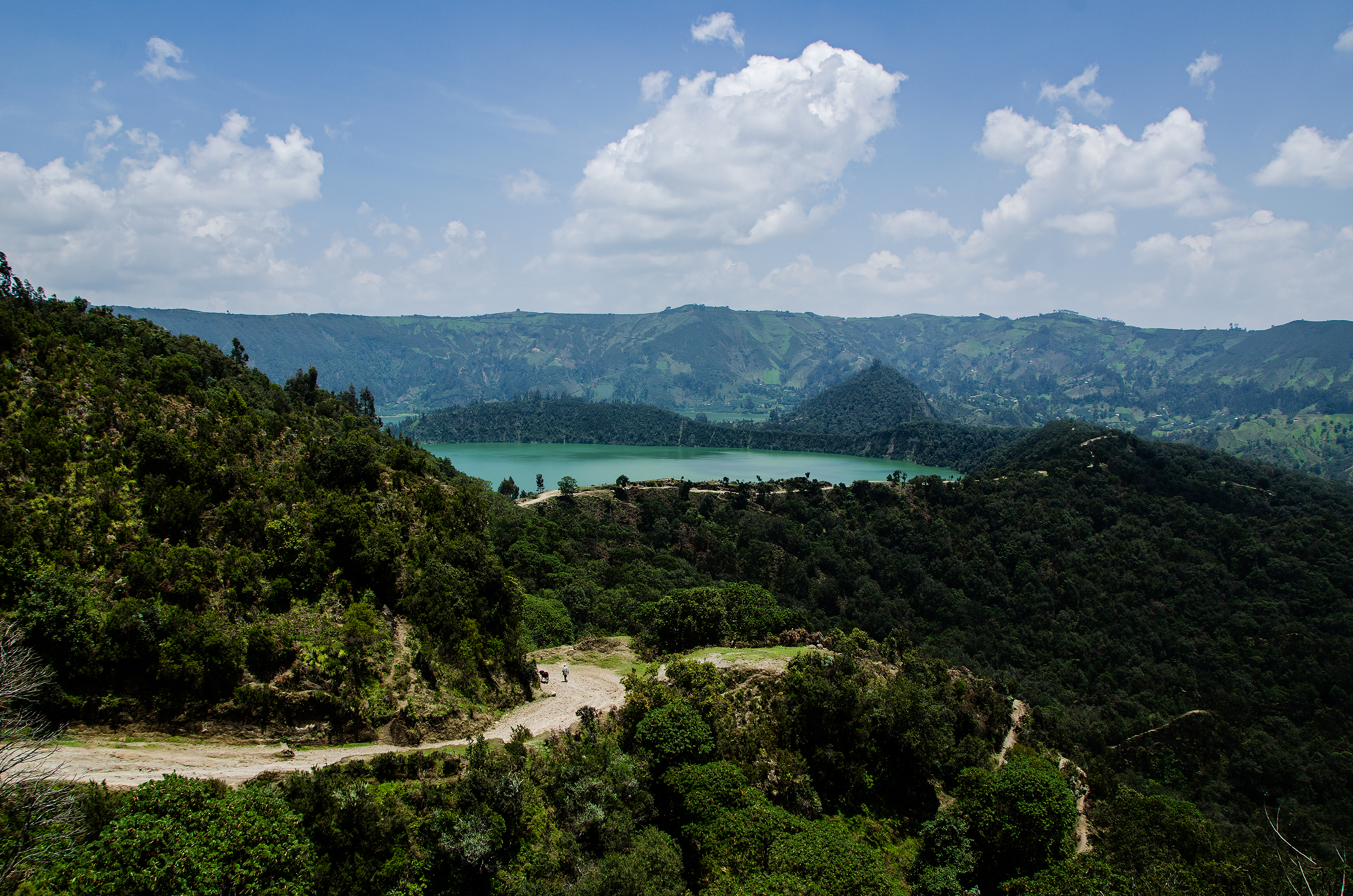
Wonchi Lake

Waliso town has seven administrative Kebeles. Dej. Geresu Duki Comprehensive Secondary School, Oromia Institute of Water Technology, Ambo University – Faculty of Social Science (Waliso Campus) and other private institutes and colleges are located in Woliso. In Waliso, there is a natural hot-spring, which makes the town one of the leading tourism heritages in Ethiopia.

The town allows a round view of 360 degrees from Meja hill – a volcanic mountain (Tulluu Majaa in Afaan Oromoo), situated in the middle of the town. There is also a natural hot-spring, which makes the town a tourism heritage in Ethiopia. In addition, Wonchi volcano (Wancii in Afaan Oromoo), the highest volcano Ethiopias, is 32 kilometers away from Waliso. This volcano contains a crater lake which became a tourist destination.

== History ==
Waliso is derived from the name of an Oromo clan. Legend has it that Waliso is the son of Liban (Liiban in Afaan Oromoo), who had three children: Ammaya (Ammayya in Afaan Oromoo), the oldest, Waliso (the middle) and Kutaye (the youngest). Liban belongs to Metcha, a bigger Oromo clan.

The road that ran from Addis Ababa to Waliso was one of the few roads built by the Ethiopian Empire before the Italian-Abyssinian War; by 1938, the 110 kilometers from Addis Ababa to Waliso had been asphalted, and the 90 kilometers beyond to Abelti gravelled.

After the Italian occupation of much of Ethiopia, two rival Ethiopian resistance fighters, the Arbegnoch, operated around Waliso: Geresu Duki; (Afaan Oromoo: Garasuu Dhukii) and Olika Dingel. Geresu Duki (a former member of the Ethiopian Crown Prince's personal guard) was in the end the better-known – and the longer-lived of both – but Olika Dingel, a Welega Oromo, was as legendary. Geresu Dhuki was the offspring of a local Oromo Prince, Akkawaaq Darra Gada.

In 1955 a 40 kW hydro-electric power station was built; by 1965 the installed electrical capacity was 32 kVA and the annual production 64,500 kWh. In 1958, Waliso was one of 27 places in Ethiopia ranked as First Class Township. The Multipurpose Community Telecentre was opened in February 2000, with assistance from the British Council. It was the first of its kind in Ethiopia, and the next one was opened in Debre Berhan almost two years later. That same year, construction of a 200-bed hospital was completed, the Wolisso Hospital (officially the St. Luke Catholic Hospital), which was then opened on 27 April 2001. Construction was launched in 1997 by an Italian organization (CUAMM Doctors with Africa), equipment included surgical, X-ray and laboratory equipment, at a cost of 72 million Birr.

The second largest flower farm in Ethiopia, owned by the Indian company Surya Blossoms, had its official opening in Woliso on 22 June 2009. Present at the opening was Trade and Industry Minister Girma Biru, Indian Ambassador to Ethiopia, Gurjit Sing, Oromia Regional president Abadula Gemeda, and Chairman of Karuturi Global Limited, the parent corporation of Surya Blossoms, Surya Rao.

== Demographics ==
The 2009 national census reported a total population for Waliso of 59,685, of whom 18,880 were men and 18,998 were women. The majority of the inhabitants said they practised Ethiopian Orthodox Christianity, with 23.29% of the population reporting they observed this belief, while 59.06% of the population were Protestant, and 16.36% were Muslim.

The 1994 national census reported this town had a total population of 25,491 of whom 11,899 were males and 13,592 were females. It is the largest town in Waliso and Goro woreda.

== Climate ==
Climate data for Waliso, elevation 1,960 m (6,430 ft), (1971–2000)
| Month | Jan | Feb | Mar | Apr | May | Jun | Jul | Aug | Sep | Oct | Nov | Dec | Year |
|---|---|---|---|---|---|---|---|---|---|---|---|---|---|
| Mean daily maximum °C (°F) | 25.6 (78.1) | 26.7 (80.1) | 26.7 (80.1) | 26.6 (79.9) | 26.9 (80.4) | 24.0 (75.2) | 21.6 (70.9) | 21.5 (70.7) | 23.2 (73.8) | 24.5 (76.1) | 24.2 (75.6) | 25.6 (78.1) | 24.8 (76.6) |
| Mean daily minimum °C (°F) | 11.4 (52.5) | 11.7 (53.1) | 12.1 (53.8) | 12.5 (54.5) | 11.5 (52.7) | 11.2 (52.2) | 11.5 (52.7) | 10.9 (51.6) | 10.3 (50.5) | 10.4 (50.7) | 10.4 (50.7) | 10.3 (50.5) | 11.2 (52.1) |
| Average precipitation mm (inches) | 5.0 (0.20) | 39.0 (1.54) | 63.0 (2.48) | 79.0 (3.11) | 99.0 (3.90) | 256.0 (10.08) | 277.0 (10.91) | 239.0 (9.41) | 109.0 (4.29) | 20.0 (0.79) | 16.0 (0.63) | 6.0 (0.24) | 1,208 (47.58) |
| Average relative humidity (%) | 47 | 43 | 45 | 52 | 57 | 71 | 84 | 84 | 76 | 53 | 43 | 49 | 59 |
Source: FAO
