= Goro (Aanaa) =

District of Ethiopia

Goro is one of the Districts in the Oromia region of Ethiopia. It was part of former Walisona Goro district. It is part of the Southwest Shewa Zone. The Kebena people, who are also found in neighboring Kebena woreda, form the majority of inhabitants in this district.

== Demographics ==
The 2007 national census reported a total population for this woreda of 45,486, of whom 22,912 were men and 22,574 were women; 3,714 or 8.17% of its population were urban dwellers. The majority of the inhabitants said they were Muslim, with 70.23% of the population reporting they observed this belief, while 26.75% of the population practised Ethiopian Orthodox Christianity, and 2.16% were Protestant.
