= Southwest Shewa Zone =

Zone in Oromia Region of Ethiopia

South west Shewa Zone Shawaa Kibba Lixaa (Oromo)
- Zone
- Interactive map of South west Shewa Zone
- Country: Ethiopia
- Region: Oromia
- Capital: Waliso

Southwest Shewa (Oromo: Shawaa Kibba Lixaa) is one of the zones of the Oromia Region in Ethiopia. This zone takes its name from the kingdom or former province of Shewa. Between 2002 and 2005, a number of districts were separated from West Shewa Zone to create South west Shewa Zone. Towns in it include Waliso (the capital) and Tulu Bolo.

Map of the regional state and zones of Ethiopia

== Demographics ==
Based on the 2007 Census conducted by the Central Statistical Agency of Ethiopia (CSA), this Zone has a total population of 1,101,129, of whom 556,194 are men and 544,935 women. 149,878 or 13.61% of population are urban inhabitants. A total of 233,916 households were counted in this Zone, which results in an average of 4.71 persons to a household, and 227,102 housing units. The three largest ethnic groups reported in Southwest Shewa were the Oromo (87.08%), the Amhara (6.16%) and the Gurage (5.06%); all other ethnic groups made up 1.7% of the population. Oromo was spoken as a first language by 84.85%, 8.41% spoke Amharic and 5.57% spoke Guragiegna; the remaining 1.17% spoke all other primary languages reported. The majority of the inhabitants professed Ethiopian Orthodox Christianity, with 77.82% of the population having reported they practiced that belief, while 11.11% of the population were Muslim, 8.81% of the population professed Protestantism and 2.04% said they held traditional beliefs.
