= House demolition in Ethiopia (2019–present) =

Ethiopian government house demolition campaign

Many buildings have been demolished by the government of Ethiopia under Prime Minister Abiy Ahmed since early 2019, with 12,000 homes planned to be demolished for the purpose of rebuilding smart city. The project was targeted toward Addis Ababa and Oromia, in the towns of Sebeta, Buraryu, Lagatafo Lagadadi, Sululta, Ermojo, and Gelan all of Which were merged to form Sheger City in October 2022. Residents have criticized the government demolition, claiming they paid taxes to the government properties, and the government is illegally taking undue advantage to confiscate for the Oromia government.

The house destruction has led to violence and protests in some areas. The Amhara Association of America claims that Oromia authorities have used house demolition to displace, assault and detain ethnic Amharas between 9 January and 31 January 2023.

== History ==
Since early 2019, the Ethiopian government under Abiy Ahmed administration begun large-scale house demolition that deemed "illegal property" in Addis Ababa and the Oromia Region in the area of Sebeta, Buraryu, Legetafo, Legedadi, Sululta, Ermojo, and Galan towns, with 12,000 houses destroyed by the government, which led to further unrest in the country. On 19 February 2019, bulldozers raided into Legetafo area and demolished 3,000 homes, leaving thousands homeless and ruining business activities. Mayor of Legetafo Legedadi Habiba Sirajs supported the demolition as a necessary step corresponding to the 2017 master plan, which was part of urban strategies. According to a 29 April 2020 report released by Amnesty International, at least 1,000 people were left homeless amid the COVID-19 pandemic, mostly laborer over three weeks.

According to the Ethiopian Human Rights Council, houses in Yeka and Bole districts are commonly demolished. Residents allege that they paid taxes and the demolition is "illegal to take advantage for Oromia government". Liliana Farha, the U.N. Special Rapporteur for Adequate Housing, told her concern over the house demolition in Legetafo and Legedadi, stating "The rapporteur will be investigating this issue and reminds all actors involved that forced evictions constitute an egregious violation of the right to housing." Activist Jawar Mohammed said that the government is irresponsible to demolish resident houses because they do not offer sufficient housing for them, after which the residents built "moon houses", a house illegally built overnight. The victims often targeted toward residents with low-income economy. The Ethiopian Institution of the Ombudsman (EIO) criticized the government action. Chief Executive Ombudsman of EIO, Endale Haile, spoke on Ahadu Radio that the government demolition campaign is indiscriminate regardless of people's conditions to have acquire homes.

As of February 2023, about 80% houses would be wiped out according to information gathered by the city's administration. Churches and mosques have also been targeted. On 26 May 2023, Ethiopian Muslims protested near the Grand Anwar Mosque to protest the government's decision to destroy 30 mosques in the newly established "Sheger City", formerly Oromia Special Zone Surrounding Finfinne. The Addis Ababa Federal Police stormed the protesters, and in response the protesters threw stones, which killed two people. The Ethiopian Islamic Affairs Supreme Council and the Oromia Region Islamic Affairs Council condemned the police action against the protesters. According to Amhara Association of America, the Oromia authorities continued house demolition that belonged to ethnic Amhara, started arbitrary arrests, and tortured prisoners between 9 January and 31 January 2023. In March 2024, the government under Addis Ababa City Administration relaunched demolition in Piassa. Many historical sites has been razed, including cafés, shops, bar and restaurants and jewelries houses. From 2024, the Addis Ababa City Corridor Project was launched to upgrade key routes and improve connectivity among the corridors. It was expected to be completed in 2025.

== See also ==
- 2023 in Ethiopia
