= Political repression under Abiy Ahmed =

Political repression is a visible scenario under the leadership of Prime Minister Abiy Ahmed after 2018, characterized by severe human rights violation, restriction of press, speeches, dissents, activism and journalism that are critical to his government. Similar to TPLF-led EPRDF regime, there was a raise of censorship in the country, particularly internet shutdowns under the context of anti-terror legislation labelling them "disinformation and war narratives" since the raise of armed conflict in Ethiopia. In June 2018, Abiy unblocked 64 internet access that include blogs and news outlets.

Early Abiy reforms were reversal of the former EPRDF repressive regime, such as liberalized the civil society law, released dozen prisoners, and detained journalists and activists. The committee to Protect Journalists noted Ethiopia jumped 40 position in the World Press Freedom Index by 2019.

== Detention ==
Early Abiy Ahmed tenure was characterized by major reforms in human rights, including releasing several political prisoners that were detained by EPRDF regime. After the Tigrayan rebels captured Dessie and advanced towards the capital, Abiy declared state of emergency on 2 November 2021, encouraging mass arrests individuals "suspected of collaborating with terrorist groups" without warrant. The US government, various human rights groups and mainstream media accused the declaration of ethnic profiling against Tigrayans. Secret vigilantes operated in Addis Ababa and submitted individuals to the government supposed supporting the TPLF and OLA rebels. Tigrayan civilians were mostly detained in Western Tigray Zone. The detentions continued after the state of emergency in the capital Addis Ababa, targeting towards to some UN staffs members who were taken from their homes. According to UN spokesperson Stephane Dujarric, 16 staff members of Ethiopian citizen detained while six others were freed.

On 20 May 2022, Brigadier General Tefera Mamo, who led the Amhara Regional Special Forces against Tigrayan rebels during the Tigray War, was arrested after a comment criticizing Abiy and his affiliation in Amhara region of being "motivated by money". Also, by 23 May 2022, the number of arrest has been inclined; 4,500 journalists and activists were arrested in what is called "law enforcement operations" by the government. While Abiy state the mass arrest is justified because of stability and security reasons, critics accused the government of utterly human rights violation, including extrajudicial killings. On 5 January 2023, the Ethiopian Human Rights Council (EHRCO) experts Daniel Tesfaye, Bezuayehu Wondimu, Bereket Daniel and Nahom Husen went to a village called Alem Bank in west Addis Ababa to investigate people whose houses are demolished by the Addis Ababa municipal government. While gathering information around, unidentified police forces detained the four and forcefully disappeared for several hours until they relocated to Gelan Gudan Police Station. They were brought in Sebeta police station. Police alleged that they haven't permission letters to inform Oromia authority to carry out investigation.

== Crackdown ==
During the early Abiy's premiership, there was a hope of democratic transition. He was questioned over his democratic reform, including the release of political prisoners and return of exiled dissent activists to the country. On 14 November 2018, Abiy announced to end the ongoing crackdown on human rights groups by bringing to justice. Since 12 November, 60 officials from intelligence organizations and METEC have been arrested. According to Fana Broadcasting Corporate (FBC), Gudeta Olana, the head of security at Ethio Telecom, detained for no reason. Abiy launched a crackdown against Oromo Liberation Army (OLA) and insurgency and Qeerroo movement in western and southern Oromia in December 2018. For instance, the government sought a crackdown operation in Nekemte in early 2020, where many residents abused, and killing opposition politicians and human rights groups by soldiers. On 26 April 2022, the Ethiopian Media Authority filed criminal cases on 25 media outlets, and began searching for local newsrooms, detaining 19 people including journalists, magazine editors and talk show hosts.

Internet has been frequently shut down since September 2019 protests. The government justified these measures to ensure combatting hate speech via social media platforms. Many state-owned television stations, like EBC, Fana and Walta TV are under government control, broadcasting the alleged human rights violation and corruption issues of the former EPRDF regime as well as glorifying the current regime. The use of documentary propaganda film has been the major feature of Abiy Ahmed regime to entice public support in absence of independent media. Most films are centered around many governmental departments and agencies such as the Federal Police, National Intelligence and Security Service (NISS), the Ethiopian National Defense Force (ENDF), the Information Network Security Agency and the Ethiopian Artificial Intelligence Institute.

In early April 2023, the Ethiopian federal forces stormed in Amhara region to disarm regional military and Fano militias, resulted in skirmish and protests in Gondar, Kobo, Sekota, Weldiya and other cities. The government responded by repression against opposition communication services including mobile operators. According to Armed Conflict Location and Event Data Project (ACLED) report released in 2023, 78 political violence events and at least 226 reported fatalities were recorded. 56% was targeted to civilian, 40% increase compared to May.

== Persecution ==
Abiy Ahmed accused of demolishing 19 mosques since the start of Ramadan 2023 for the sake of development of Sheger City. Muslims marched to protest on 26 May 2023 following prayer at Grand Anwar Mosque and Noor Mosque. 2 people killed as a result of shooting by security forces as dozens injured. The government was accused of neglecting providing religious protection, such as in October 2019 protests, where 86 people mostly Orthodox Christians died of violence.

Ethnic violence becomes longstanding, especially in the areas of Amhara, Benishangul-Gumuz and Oromia regions, where thousands of Amharas are deported from the southern region. Anti-Amharan mistreatment and abuse therefore much of concern for international organizations, notably Amnesty International called the problem "ethnically motivated attack and displacement. British charity worker Graham Peebles argued on his article "The focus of the regime’s enmity is the Amhara people, a large ethnic group making up around 30 percent of the population. In the last four years Amhara communities living in the Oromo region have been subjected to sustained violence by Oromo nationalists: the Oromo Liberation Front (OLF)/Oromo Liberation Army (OLA), together with Oromo Special Forces (OSF) and the Queero (Oromo youth group) are behind the violence, with it seems, the approval, perhaps active participation, of the government."
