= Smart City Project =

Ongoing urban planning project in Ethiopia

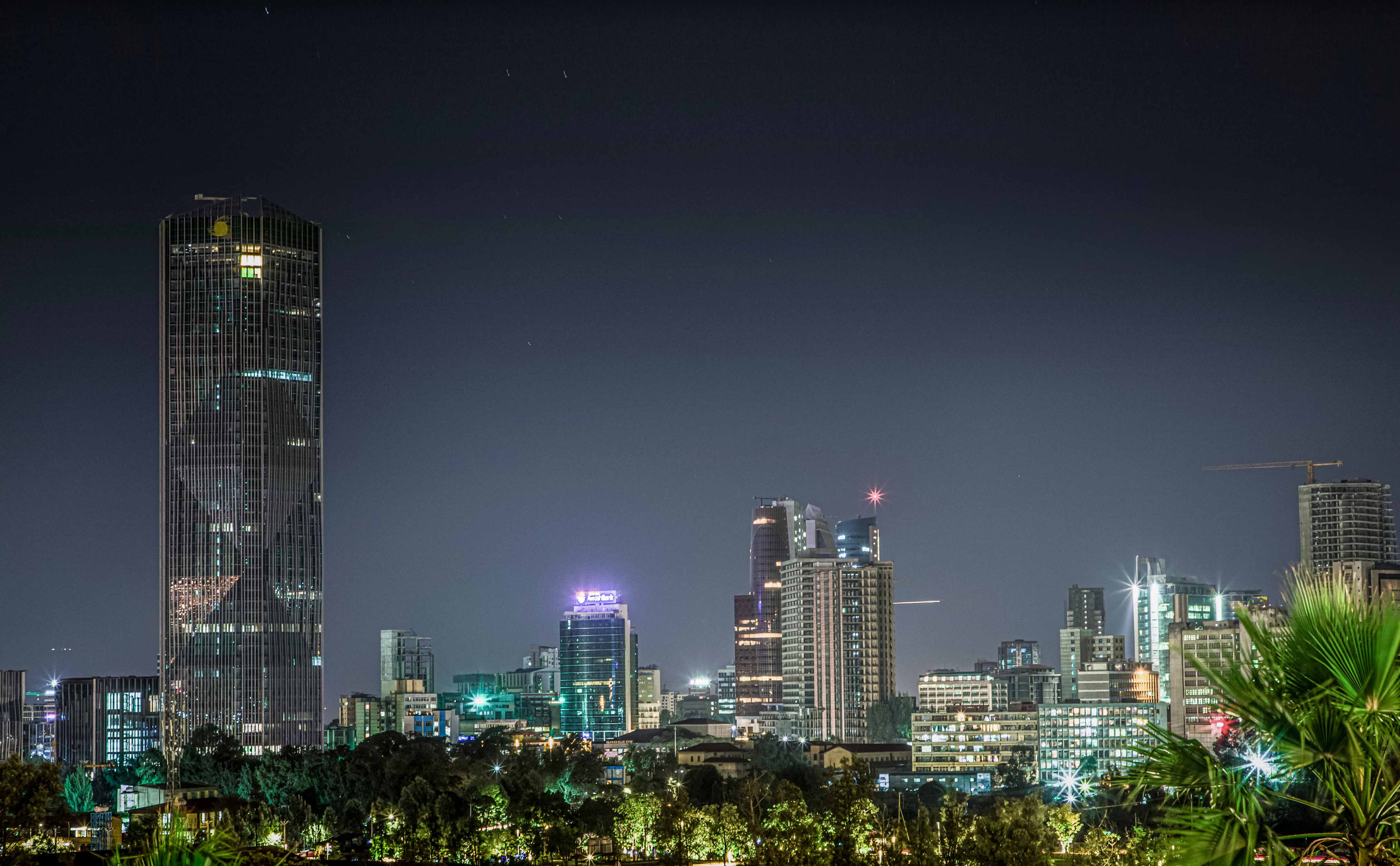
- Addis Ababa's Meskel area at night in 2022
- Location: Ethiopia
- Groundbreaking: 29 December 2022; 3 years ago

Companies
- Contractor: China Civil Engineering Construction Corporation; Ethio Telecom (network infrastructure); GRE German Rail Engineering; Sur Construction PLC; Ethiopian Construction Works Corporation; Agere (consultancy)
- Developer: Ethiopian Road Transport Authority

Smart City Project is an ongoing urban planning project in Ethiopia that was initially commenced in December 2022 in Addis Ababa and largely expanded to every city by 2024. The project aims to upgrade key routes and improve connectivity among the corridors. It is planned to expand metropolis that incorporates the construction of bicycle routes, spacious pedestrian walkways, roads, parks, libraries, and additional housing.

The Ethiopian Road Transport Authority (ERTA) is the main state developer awarded with three billion birr contract to the China Civil Engineering Construction Corporation. Ethio Telecom also provides telecom facilities and networking infrastructure along with local consultant companies.

The Corridor project has been controversial due to relation with the current major house demolition in Addis Ababa and elsewhere, particularly in old parts of the town. Opponents of the project also claim that the economic or societal benefits are not clear and there is a major mis-prioritization considering other critical macroeconomic, societal, political and ideological issues the country is facing. The initiative is undertaking around Dire Dawa, Amhara and Oromia regions.

== Addis Ababa ==
The Addis Ababa City Corridor Project was launched by the Addis Ababa City Administration on 29 December 2022 to upgrade key routes and improve connectivity among the corridors. The groundbreaking ceremony was attended by high-ranking officials like Mayor of Addis Ababa Adanech Abebe. Targeted places and routes were from Mexico to Sar Bet and Wollo Sefer. The project aims to expand metropolis that includes projects for the construction of bicycle routes, spacious pedestrian walkways, better roads, parks, libraries, and additional housing. To improve quality of life, drainage systems would fully developed, upgrading utility networks such as power and internet. During a meeting with project leaders on 27 March 2024, Prime Minister Abiy Ahmed highlighted the necessity of project with the goal of transforming Addis Ababa to "hospitable and livable metropolis" for its citizens, He acknowledges the potential effect on government-owned or leased properties, low-income communities, and the private sector during the project phase and stakeholders would benefitted from the involvement.

The City Administration prepared land plot auction amidst the project, primarily in Piassa. The corridor project often has been related to widespread house demolition in the city. In May 2022, the corridor project launched Chaka Project, aiming toward the renewal of forest in Yeka sub-city and added scenery of artificial lakes, resorts and residencies. Its operation maintained by a contractor named E-tollo with 500 billion birr.

=== Second phase ===
Addis Ababa Mayor Adanech Abebe announced that the second phase of corridor development project works is set to be launched in October 2024 in various areas of the Ethiopian capital, after the success of the first phase of the corridor and redevelopment project. It spans 132 kilometers from Kazanchis to Estinfanos Corridor.

==== Corridors ====
This phase includes eight corridors with different length and focus:

- Kasanchis-Estifanos-Meskel Square-Mexico-Churchill-Arat Kilo: 40.4 km long, this corridor connects major transportation hubs and commercial centers
- Chaka Project (South Gate)–Megenagna–Haya Hulet– Meskel Square: 7.1 km long, this corridor connects Southgate with Haya Hulet
- CMC-Summit-Goro-Bole VIP Terminal Corridor and Addis International Convention and Exhibition Center Corridor: 10.8 km long, this corridor includes the VIP terminal at Bole Airport
- Anbessa Garage-Jacros Area-Goro: 3.1 km long
- Arat Kilo-Shiro Meda-Entoto Maryam-Gulele Botanical Garden: 13.19 km long
- Kebena Riverside Development Corridor: 20 km long
- Entoto-Peacock River Corridor: 21.5 km long

== Dire Dawa ==
The Dire Dawa city corridor project was led by Head of the Project Construction Office Wondwosen Jenber. The first phase which is 11-kilometer corridor was commenced in February 2025. This project encompasses the Chinese aided the 144-km Mieso-Dire Dawa Expressway Project that was launched on 19 August 2025.

== Amhara Region ==
The Amhara Region corridor development was commenced on 9 February 2025 in Bahir Dar, Dessie, Kombolcha, Debre Berhan, Debre Markos, and Weldiya. It is largely public funded via its own resources, public participation, federal support, and various grants. The project of Bahir Dar, Gondar, Dessie, Kombolcha, Debre Berhan, Debre Markos, and Weldiya includes the construction of 32.23 km of roads, 27.04 hectares of green spaces and parks, 3.7 hectares of public squares, 25 km of roadside lighting, and building facade works.

This was undertaken in different phases with quick timeframe to maintain quality standard. As of 2025, Gondar, Kombolcha, and Bahir Dar completed the first phase and began the second phase of project.

== Oromia Region ==
The Oromia region corridor project commenced on 22 June 2024 by President Shimelis Abdisa, with focusing on roadmap of integrating Addis Ababa sub-cities to surrounding Oromia Zone, namely called Sheger City. The first phase began in Kura Jida, Taffo, Koye Feche and Galan. It is expected to be completed in five years.
