= Daleti =

- City
- Location in Ethiopia
- Coordinates: 8°53′45″N 38°38′50″E
- Country: Ethiopia
- Region: Oromiyaa
- Zone: Oromia Special Zone Surrounding Finfinne
- Woreda: Sebeta Hawas
- Time zone: UTC+3 (EAT)

Daleti (Oromo: Daalattii, Amharic: ዳለቲ), also spelled Daletti, is a town in central Ethiopia. Located in the Sebeta Hawas district, Daleti is a suburban city predominantly inhabited by the Silt'e, Gurage and Warjih. Notable cities and locations near this town are Sebeta Hawas, Sebeta, Tulluu Furii, and Addis Ababa, the capital city of Ethiopia which Daleti is only a rough 4 km away from its center.

== Note ==
Note: There is another market town in Oromia Region officially named Daleti and it is located in the Yaya Gulele district of the North Shewa Zone.
