= Ejerie =

District in Oromia Region, Ethiopia

Coordinates: 8°55′N 38°35′E

Ejerie is a woreda in Oromia Region, Ethiopia. Part of the West Shewa Zone, it is bordered on the south by the Southwest Shewa Zone, on the west by Dendi, on the northwest by Jeldu, on the north by Meta Robi, on the northeast by Adda Berga, and on the east by Walmara. The major town in Ejerie is Ejerie town, after which the district has been named.

The source of the Awash River, Mount Warqe, lies in this woreda. The August 2006 floods affected Ejerie, causing widespread damage. In this woreda—combined with Sebata, Awas, and Elu woredas—14,790 persons were affected and 2,052 people displaced.

== Demographics ==
The 2007 national census reported a total population for this woreda of 86,934, of whom 44,222 were men and 42,712 were women; 10,071 or 11.59% of its population were urban dwellers. The majority of the inhabitants said they practised Ethiopian Orthodox Christianity, with 82.18% of the population reporting they observed this belief, while 13.64% of the population practiced traditional beliefs, and 3.04% were Protestant.

Based on figures published by the Central Statistical Agency in 2005, this woreda has an estimated total population of 98,832, of whom 49,332 were males and 49,500 were females; 13,423 or 13.58% of its population are urban dwellers, which is greater than the Zone average of 12.3%. With an estimated area of 592.19 square kilometers, Ejerie has an estimated population density of 166.9 people per square kilometer, which is greater than the Zone average of 152.8.

The 1994 national census reported a total population for this woreda of 69,686, of whom 35,038 were men and 34,648 women; 7,516 or 10.79% of its population were urban dwellers at the time. The three largest ethnic groups reported in Ejerie were the Oromo (82.97%), the Amhara (14.78%), and the Sebat Bet Gurage (0.92%); all other ethnic groups made up 1.33% of the population. Oromo was spoken as a first language by 84.01%, and 15.27% spoke Amharic; the remaining 0.72% spoke all other primary languages reported. The majority of the inhabitants professed Ethiopian Orthodox Christianity, with 90.86% of the population reporting they practiced that belief, while 7.91% practiced traditional beliefs.
