= Holeta =

Town in Oromia Region, Ethiopia

Holeta ሆለታ Holataa
- Town
- Location within Ethiopia Holeta (Africa)
- Coordinates: 9°3′N 38°30′E
- Country: Ethiopia
- Region: Oromia
- Zone: Oromia Special Zone surrounding Finfinne
- Woreda: Walmara
- Elevation: 2,391 m (7,844 ft)

Population (2007)
  - Total: 25,593
- Time zone: UTC+3 (EAT)

Holeta (Oromo: Holataa; Amharic: ሆለታ) is a town in the special zone of Oromia Region, Ethiopia. It has a latitude and longitude of 9°3′N 38°30′E and an altitude of 2391 meters above sea level.

== History ==
Holeta came into existence with the construction of the Addis Ababa—Addis Alem road, and houses in the latter town were dismantled and brought to this new settlement. It became the new "country retreat" for Emperor Menelik II and Empress Taytu Betul. According to Richard Pankhurst, when the couple were in residence, its population would mushroom from about 2,400 to as many as 15,000. It was the first place in Ethiopia to have a permanent water mill, built in 1909 on the Holetta River.

Holeta is best known as the location of the Holeta Military Academy. Opened in January 1935, and staffed by five Swedish officers, the first class of 120 cadets did not complete their studies due to the Second Italo-Ethiopian War. It was reopened once Emperor Haile Selassie returned to Ethiopia, and celebrated its 25th anniversary 20–30 April 1960. After the murder of Hadush Araya on 14 February 1996, the academy was renamed for him. Hadush Araya was one of the military leaders of the Tigray People's Liberation Front.

== Economy ==
Like much of Ethiopia, the economy is mainly based on agriculture but industry is growing. Habesha Cement has announced that it is constructing a new cement plant within the city limits of Holeta. The town hosts a research station of the Ethiopian Institute of Agricultural Research. Founded in 1963, this station is the national center for research to improve the yield of barley, highland oil crops, potatoes, and dairy products.

== Demographics ==
The 2007 national census reported Holeta's population as 25,593, of whom 12,605 were men and 12,988 women. The majority of the inhabitants said they practised Ethiopian Orthodox Christianity, with 73% of the population reporting they observed this belief, while 20.44% of the population were Protestant, and 5.43% were Muslim.

According to the 1994 national census, the town's population was 16,785, of whom 8,040 were males and 8,745 females. It is the largest of three towns in the Walmara woreda.
