= Jagama Kello =

Ethiopian military officer

Lieutenant General Jagama Kello Jaagamaa Keelloo
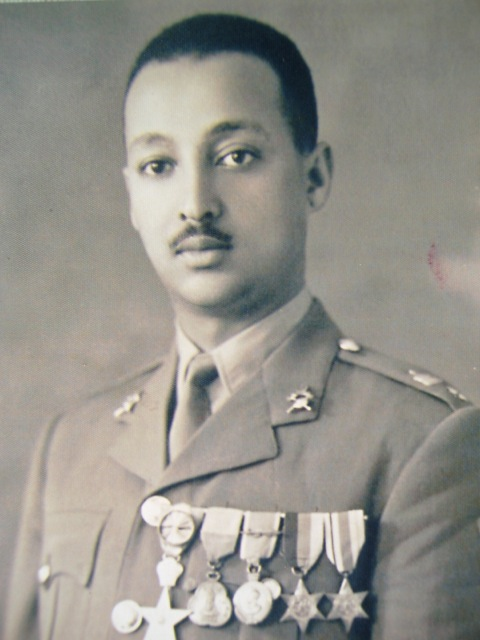
- Born: 29 January 1920; Dendi, Shewa Province, Ethiopian Empire
- Died: 7 April 2017 (aged 97); Addis Ababa, Ethiopia
- Military career
- Allegiance: Ethiopian Empire
- Branch: Army
- Service years: 1935–1974
- Rank: Lt. General
- Conflicts: Second Italo-Ethiopian War; World War II; Ethiopian-Somali War of 1964; Bale Revolt

Jagama Kello (Oromo: Jaagamaa Keelloo; Amharic: ጃጋማ ኬሎ; 29 January 1920 – 7 April 2017) was an Ethiopian military officer in the Imperial Ethiopian Army.

== Early life ==
Jagama Kello was born on 29 January 1920 in Ginchi area of Shewa, not far from Addis Ababa. He was an ethnic Oromo and hailed from the Tulama clan. His father was a very wealthy landlord who owned 900 acres of farmland.

== Life as an Arbegna ==
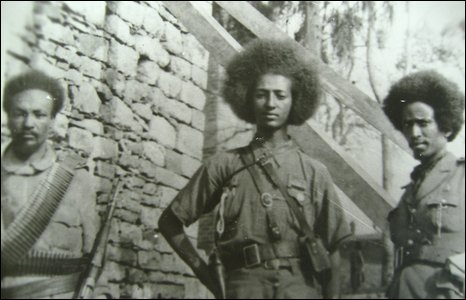
Jagama Kello (center) with two other Arbegnoch fighters, 1940.

When the Italians invaded Ethiopia in 1935, at the age of 15 Jagama and his older brother went into the bush to join the Arbegnoch. At first he had no gun – only his elder brother had one. But they ambushed Italian troops and gradually armed themselves. Peasants joined the struggle and by the end of the war they had over 3,000 fighters under their command, his forces were active in the mountainous areas of western Shewa.

On 2 December 1940, he and his soldiers raided the Italian garrison at Addis Alem. They killed 72 Italians in the engagement including their commander Vittorio Casardi, and captured over 2,000 rifles.

On 5 May 1941, after years in exile in Britain, the Emperor Haile Selassie returned to his capital. Jagama, who had received no British help during the 5 years of the war, refused to go to Addis Ababa for the ceremony. In the end the Emperor came to Ginchi. Jagama says he put his 3,500 troops on parade, to greet Haile Selassie. He was then driven in the Emperor’s own car to his palace, where he was awarded a gabardine coat and a gold watch. But the war was not yet over. Jimma was still under Italian control. The Emperor asked Jagama for help and he says he led his forces into battle. Reports suggest the area was ‘swarming with Patriots’ – many of whom may have been loyal to Jagama. He told the BBC that his forces captured some 500 Italian soldiers, whom he handed over to the British.

Jagama became dangerously ill with malaria and was taken to hospital in Addis Ababa. But the British doctor refused to treat him until he had a haircut. But Jagama was very proud of his afro, since it had scared his enemies and he refused and went home. It was only when Emperor Haile Selassie came to his house and personally ordered that his hair be cut to save his life that he gave in and accepted his fate.

== Later career ==
Jagama remained in the military, rising to the rank of Lieutenant General. He remained loyal to Emperor Haile Selassie when others deserted him, and was one of a number of officers who refused to participate in the ill-fated coup of 1960. Jagama was also instrumental in crushing a rebellion in Bale during the 1960’s and was rewarded by being appointed provincial military commander.

He died in Addis Ababa at the age of 97.
