= Sharia courts in Ethiopia =

Courts applying Islamic law in Ethiopia

Sharia courts in Ethiopia, ruling on matters according to Islamic law, have existed in some capacity for centuries and have been officially recognized since 1944. The sharia court systems in Ethiopia have jurisdiction over personal status matters of family law, including marriage, divorce and inheritance as was recognized in the 1944 proclamation. They continue to hold this subject-matter jurisdiction under the current laws under the 1995 Constitution of the Federal Democratic Republic of Ethiopia (FDRE).

The federal sharia court system in Ethiopia has three tiers: the Federal Supreme Court of Sharia, Federal High Courts of Sharia, and the Federal First Instance Courts of Sharia. Each region of Ethiopia has its own sharia court system, most of which are also three tiered. Decisions of the regional courts of sharia are not reviewable by federal sharia courts and decisions of the federal sharia courts, including the Federal Supreme Court of Sharia, are not reviewable by the regular courts. However, the House of Federation, the non-lawmaking upper house of the Ethiopian legislature, has overturned decisions of the sharia courts, whose decisions are otherwise final. A notable example is the Kedija Bashir et al. case, in which the House of Federation firmly established that sharia courts may not hear a case unless there is consent from all parties to the case.

== History ==
Muslims have lived in Ethiopia since the foundation of the religion. According to the hadith and sīrah texts, followers of Mohammad first emigrated to present-day Ethiopia in 615 CE in a migration that has come to be known as the First Hijra. Since then, Muslims in Ethiopia have applied sharia law in their day-to-day interactions within the community.

As early as the 10th century, Kadis courts existed in Muslim sultanates in the Northern and Eastern regions. The Muslim sultanates of Bali, Dawaro, Hadiya, Arababni, and Ifat were among those that existed during this period and where sharia courts operated before the formation of the modern Ethiopian state. Muslim and Christian political actors may have engaged in power struggles during the Middle Ages, but the population has also developed a way of coexisting with many modes of interaction between people of either religion, motivated by economic activity or recognition of common cultural traits. Nonetheless, Islam in Ethiopia had always held a secondary role with Christianity historically recognized as the state religion. The Orthodox Tewahedo Church held significant power over Ethiopian emperors since they relied on the Church to legitimize their claim to the throne.

During the Italian invasion in the 1930s, official recognition was given to Islam. Fascist Italy sought to weaken the Ethiopian Church since the Christian institution was viewed as tied the Ethiopian nationalist identity. Italian policy intended to undermine the Church but without flagrant persecution. The massacres such as those instituted during the initial period of Italian rule were believed would incite further resistance, so Italy sought to weaken the Church as an institution. The Italians built mosques near Muslim populations, including the great mosque in Addis Ababa, and restored old mosques near coastal areas where there was already Islamic presence. Kadis were given recognition to deal with matters under sharia law in their respective districts. Arabic was taught in schools established for Muslims, and government decrees in Jimma and Harar Region were issued in Arabic. In Jimma, a higher school of Islamic sciences was also formed to study fiqh, Islamic jurisprudence.

After liberation from the Italian conquest, perhaps to diminish the religious division the Italians have hoped to incite, the emperor enacted Proclamation No. 12, The Kadis' Courts Proclamation of 1942, which was followed two years later by Proclamation No. 62, The Kadis and Naibas Councils Proclamation of 1944. Under these proclamations, the sharia courts in Ethiopia were consolidated and given official recognition to adjudicate on matters of family law and inheritance. However, after enactment of the 1955 Constitution and proclamations enacting the Civil Code in the 1960s, the jurisdiction of sharia courts in relation to the secular courts was again unclear. According to Robert Allen Sedler, a legal scholar who was formerly dean and associate professor of law at Haile Selassie I University, after promulgation of the Civil Code, it was reported that the Minister of Justice instructed the courts to continue operating under their existing jurisdiction. As of 1967, the Sharia Court of Appeal continued to operate as a division of the Supreme Imperial Court. The sharia courts are the only courts besides the regular state courts that continued to function with the Christian religious courts having been abolished as early as 1940, however, Muslims continued to also hold second-class status and were excluded from various institutions and political positions of power.

Under the administration from 2012 to 2018 of Prime Minister Hailemariam who has said that "Muslim extremists want to impose Sharia law on everybody in Ethiopia", Muslims particularly in Oromo suffered persecution including incidents such as the celebration of Irreechaa in Bishoftu which lead to deaths of more than 52 people. In June 2020, the House of Peoples' Representatives passed Decree No. 1207/2020, which recognizes the Ethiopian Supreme Council of Islamic Affairs as representative of the Ethiopian Muslims at home and abroad and at the same time giving recognition to Protestant Christians.

== Structure and jurisdiction ==
At the top of the three-level federal sharia court system in Ethiopia is the Federal Supreme Court of Sharia, the highest appellate court. Per the Federal Courts of Sharia Consolidation Proclamation No.188/1999, the Federal Supreme Court is only accountable to Federal Judicial Administration Commission which oversees and approves the appointment of Kadis, Heads, and Chief Kadi who are nominated by the president of the regular Federal Supreme Court, based on profiles and recommendation from the Islamic Affairs Supreme Council. The Federal Supreme Court of Sharia is led by the Chief Kadi who has under him the Deputy Chief Kadi and several Kadis as necessary.

Federal Supreme Court of Sharia hears all appeals from decisions of the Federal High Court of Sharia. Below is the Federal High Court of Sharia, which is the first-stance court in cases involving more than 200,000 birr, and the appellate court on decisions of the Federal First Instance Court of Sharia. A Kadi presides over each division of the Federal First Instance Courts of Sharia, whose decisions are reviewed by the Federal High Courts of Sharia, which is each led by Head Kadi and has two other Kadis. To qualify for appointment as a Kadi in any of the Federal Courts of Sharia, the person must be an "Ethiopian who is trained in Islamic law in Islamic educational institutions or has acquired adequate experience and knowledge in Islamic law; is reputed for his diligence and good conduct; consents to assume the position of a Kadi; and is more than twenty five years of age."

Each of the regional sharia courts have a similar and parallel three-tier system, with each region having a Supreme Court of Sharia, High Courts of Sharia and First Instance Courts of Sharia. The Harari Region is the only exception to this as it has only two levels, first-instance courts and an appellate supreme court.

== Jurisprudence and cases ==
In deciding cases in the sharia courts, Kadis draw from Islamic jurisprudence, fiqh. However, the most notable case to make it through the sharia courts, the case of Kedija Bashir et al, did not hinge on any interpretation of sharia law but instead on the application of the Ethiopian Constitution and Civil Code as it relates to the jurisdiction of sharia courts.

== Sources ==
=== Journals ===
- Abbink, Jon G. (1999). "Ethiopian Islam and the Challenge of Diversity". ISIM Newsletter. 4: 24.
- Ensene, Abdiyo Ketebo (2025). "Islam and Muslims in Arsii and Jimmaa, Ethiopia, since 1974". The Journal of Oromo Studies. 29 (2): 95–113.
- Abdo, Mohammed (15 August 2011). "Legal Pluralism, Sharia Courts and Constitutional Issues in Ethiopia". Mizan Law Review. 5 (1). doi:10.4314/mlr.v5i1.68769. ISSN 1998-9881.
- Ahmed, Hussein (1998). "Islamic Literature in Ethiopia: A Short Overview". Ethiopian Journal of Languages and Literature: 25–37.
- Alemayehu, Daniel (January 2021). "Multiple Legal Orders in Ethiopia: An Impediment on the Enforcement of Women Rights". Northwestern Journal of Human Rights. 19 (1): 38.
- Aneme, Girmachew Alemu (2018). "The Coupling of State and Sharia Justice Systems in a Secular State: The Case of Ethiopia". SFB-Governance Working Paper Series (75). doi:10.17169/refubium-570.
- Assefa, Ayalew Getachew (2012). "Customary Laws in Ethiopia: A Need for Better Recognition? A Women's Rights Perspective" (PDF). Danish Institute for Human Rights. ISBN 978-87-91836-77-0.
- Ibrahim, Mohammed (2018). "The Share of Women During Succession Under State Laws and Sharia Law: Comparative Study" (PDF). Oromia Law Journal. 7 (1): 95–116.
- Mustafa, Zaki (1973). "The Substantive Law Applied by Muslim Courts in Ethiopia". Journal of Ethiopian Law. 9 (1). ISSN 2617-5851.
- Numrich, Paul D. (January 2023). "Selective Appeal to the Negus Narratives: A Case Study in Interreligious Relations". Journal of Interreligious Studies. 38: 44−61. Archived from the original on 5 February 2023.
- Østebø, Terje (2007). "The Question of Becoming: Islamic Reform-Movements in Contemporary Ethiopia". CMI Working Paper. WP 2007 (8).
- Sedler, Robert Allen (December 1967). "The Development of Legal Systems: The Ethiopian Experience". Iowa Law Review. 53: 563−635.

=== Books and chapters ===
- Abdo, Mohammed (2020). "Federal Sharia Courts in Addis Ababa: Their administration and the application of law in the light of recent developments". In Epple, Susanne; Assefa, Getachew (eds.). Legal Pluralism in Ethiopia: Actors, Challenges and Solutions. transcript Verlag. doi:10.1515/9783839450215.
- Seidel, Katrin (2019). "Constitutional Recognition of Islamic Family Law and Shariʿa Courts in Ethiopia: Governmental Strategies to Co-regulate the Plural Family Law Arena". In Oberauer, Norbert; Prief, Yvonne; Qubaja, Ulrike (eds.). Legal Pluralism in Muslim Contexts. transcript Verlag. doi:10.1163/9789004398269_008.
- Trimingham, J. Spencer (1952). Islam in Ethiopia. Oxford University Press.
- Watt, W. Montgomery (1953). Muhammad at Mecca. Oxford. ISBN 9780199067169.

=== News sources ===
- "Oromia: Stampede at Ethiopia protest leaves 52 dead". BBC News. 2 October 2016.

=== Proclamations ===
- "Federal Courts of Sharia Consolidation Proclamation No. 188/1999". Ministry of Justice. 7 December 1999.
