= Mammo Wudneh =

Ethiopian writer and playwright (1931–2012)

- Born: 22 October 1931; Bashagia, Wollo Province, Ethiopian Empire
- Died: 2 March 2012 (aged 80); Addis Ababa, Ethiopia
- Occupations: Writer; journalist; playwright
- Known for: President of the Ethiopian Writers Association,

Mammo Wudneh (Amharic: ማሞ ውድነህ; 22 October 1931 – 2 March 2012) was an Ethiopian writer, playwright, journalist and President of the Ethiopian Writers' Association. He was actively involved as a peacemaker between Ethiopia and Eritrea working on an interfaith committee chaired by Abune Paulos, the Patriarch of the Tewahedo Church.

== Early life ==
Born in 1931 to a family of humble background. Mammo was left orphaned during the Second Italo-Ethiopian War when the air force of Fascist Italy bombed his tiny village, Bashagia in what was then Wollo Province.

== Career ==
His writing skill has enabled him to secure journalistic jobs at the United States Information Service, a section of the American Embassy, and the Russian Cultural Center at Addis Ababa.

He also served at the Ethiopian Ministry of Information where he met and befriended authors like Berhanu Zerihun and Mengistu Gedamu. Mammo Wudneh was appointed head of Ethiopian News Agency in Eritrea. Shortly after the outbreak of the Ethiopian Revolution in 1974, Mammo became an editorial staffer of the magazine Yekatit.

Mammo authored historical, fictional and dramatic works, as well as translated works of authors into Amharic. His most notable translations are stories of espionage.

He also served a term as Chairman of the Ethiopian Writers Association. Furthermore, he was a recipient of different awards, including an international peace award for life-time achievement. Mammo was also instrumental in the preservation and restoration of Ethiopian historical artifacts and relics.

== Legacy ==
Fortunately, he later met one of the pilots who took part in the raid that killed his family. In a moving encounter the playwright forgave the pilot. Mammo died of cardiovascular complication on 2 March 2012, at his residence in Addis Ababa.
