= Ginde Beret =

Administrative division of Ethiopia

Coordinates: 9°30′N 37°50′E

Gindabarat (formerly known as: Kuttaayee-Liiban) is one of the woredas in the Oromia Region of Ethiopia. The district is marginal within the central-highlands of Ethiopia, being isolated geographically by lowland gorges and rivers which physically separate it from all but one neighboring district (Abuna Gindabarat), due to a poor road network. Part of the West Shewa Zone, Gindabarat is bordered on the south by Jeldu, on the southwest by Ambo, on the west by the Guder River which separates it from the Horo Guduru Welega Zone, on the north by the Abay River which separates it from the Amhara Region, on the east by the Muger River which separates it from the North Shewa Zone, and on the southeast by Meta Robi. The major town in Gindabarat is Kachise (also called Kachisi). Abuna Gindabarat woreda was separated from Gindabarat.

== Overview ==
This woreda is divided into two agro-ecological zones, locally called badda, or highland (temperate), which comprises 40% of the total area and has an altitude ranging between 1,500 and 2,604 metres (4,921 and 8,543 ft) above sea level, and badda-dare, or midland (moist subtropical), which comprises 60% and has an altitude between 1,000 and 1,500 metres (3,300 and 4,900 ft) above sea level. The badda agro-ecological zone is much cooler and receives more rainfall than the badda-dare. The district topography includes plateau, hilly and sometimes steep slopes. It has low rainfall variability with 12.1% coefficient of variation, and receive most rainfall during long rainy season (June to September). The cultivated area covers 40.8% of the woreda (of which 32.7% of the total area is planted in annual crops), while 36.1% is pasture, 1.3% forest, 9% shrubland, 8.8% degraded on non-arable land, 2% is covered by bodies of water, and all other categories of land makes up the remaining 2%. Major crops (cereal and pulse) in order of total production includes: Teff, maize, sorghum, wheat, faba bean, barley and field peas. In 1999, 55 kilometres (34 mi) of gravel road were built in Gindabarat by students, farmers and civil servants from the area.

== Demographics ==
The 2007 national census reported a total population for this woreda of 104,595, of whom 52,726 were men and 51,869 were women; 11,082 or 10.56% of its population were urban dwellers. The majority of the inhabitants were Protestant, with 55.96% of the population reporting they observed this belief, while 34.12% of the population said they practised Ethiopian Orthodox Christianity, and 9.18% practiced traditional religions.

Based on figures published by the Central Statistical Agency in 2005, this woreda has an estimated total population of 204,413, of whom 105,369 are men and 99,044 are women; 7,805 or 3.82% of its population are urban dwellers, which is less than the Zone average of 12.3%. With an estimated area of 2,417.82 square kilometers, Gindabarat has an estimated population density of 84.5 people per square kilometer, which is less than the Zone average of 152.8.

The 1994 national census reported a total population for this woreda of 147,437, of whom 71,799 were men and 75,638 women; 4,363 or 2.96% of its population were urban dwellers at the time. The two largest ethnic groups reported in Gindabarat were the Oromo (97.28%), and the Amhara (2.1%); all other ethnic groups made up 0.71% of the population. The Oromo language was spoken as a first language by 98.36%, and 1.58% spoke Amharic; the remaining 0.06% spoke all other primary languages reported. The majority of the inhabitants professed Ethiopian Orthodox Christianity, with 53.3% of the population reporting they practiced that belief, while 24.58% practiced traditional beliefs, and 21.44% of the population said they were Protestant.
