= Adda Berga =

District in Oromia Region, Ethiopia

Coordinates: 9°15′N 38°25′E

Adda Berga is a woreda in Oromia Region, Ethiopia. Part of the West Shewa Zone, Adda Berga is bordered on the south by Walmara, on the southwest by Ejerie, on the west by Meta Robi, and on the north and east by the Muger River which separates it from the north Shewa Zone. Towns in Adda Berga include Enchini, Muger and Reji.

== Overview ==
High points in this woreda include Mount Fota (3235 meters). Rivers include the Berga, the main tributary of the upper Awash River. The vegetation of the Berga flood-plain, a part of the vast plains on the Central plateau of Shewa, includes grasses, sedges and other plants peculiar to the area, which include species from the genera Haplocarpha, Ranunculus, Cyperus, and Pennisetum and Andropogon. Although coffee is an important cash crop of this woreda, less than 20 square kilometers are planted with this crop.

The Adda Berga woreda Education Office announced 18 March 2009 that construction of a secondary and five primary schools had begun that January. The construction budget of 9 million Birr was provided by Muger Cement Enterprise and World Vision Ethiopia. Completion of these buildings, scheduled for 2010, would allow 5,000 students to be enrolled, and provide each of 36 Araddaas in Adda Berga with a primary school.

== Demographics ==
The 2007 national census reported this woreda's total population as 120,654, of whom 60,366 were men and 60,288 women; 15,940 or 13.21% of its population were urban dwellers. The majority of the inhabitants (88.54%) said they practised Ethiopian Orthodox Christianity, while 5.7% of the population practiced traditional beliefs, and 5.29% were Protestant.

Based on figures published by the Central Statistical Agency in 2005, this woreda has an estimated total population of 129,889, of whom 65,871 are men and 64,018 are women; 14,284 or 11.00% of its population are urban dwellers, which is less than the Zone average of 12.3%. With an estimated area of 955 square kilometers, Adda Berga has an estimated population density of 136 people per square kilometer, which is less than the Zone average of 152.8.

The 1994 national census reported a total population for this woreda of 92,137, of whom 45,599 were men and 46,538 women; 7,999 or 8.68% of its population were urban dwellers at the time. The two largest ethnic groups reported in Adda Berga were the Oromo (91.76%), and the Amhara (7.58%); all other ethnic groups made up 0.66% of the population. Oromo was spoken as a first language by 95.5%, while 4.16% spoke Amharic; the remaining 0.34% spoke all other primary languages reported. The majority of the inhabitants professed Ethiopian Orthodox Christianity, with 98.93% of the population reporting they practiced that belief.
