= Chebii =

Chebii is a surname of Kenyan origin. Notable people with the surname include:

- Abraham Chebii (born 1979), Kenyan track long-distance runner
- Ezekiel Kiptoo Chebii (born 1991), Kenyan marathon runner

== See also ==
- Chebi (disambiguation)
