= Kachise =

Kachise (more commonly known as Kachisi by the local population) is an administrative town of Gindeberet woreda of West Shewa Zone. It is a small town with few residents. It is located 9°36'0" N and 37°49'60" E. The town is located at an altitude of 2,546 meters above sea level.

In this town, there is only one secondary school called Gindeberet Secondary School which gives free education to students in the woreda. In addition, there is also one public primary school serving the community. Regarding health facilities, there is only one hospital in the town run by the government.

The town is the market place for farmers to sale their produce like tef, sorghum, maize corn, barley, wheat, butter, vegetables and all other agricultural produces.

The market days are Thursday and Saturday, but Saturday market is the biggest and attracts a lot of people from all surrounding areas of the woreda including farmers from neighboring Amhara state of Gojam.
