= Supreme Islamic Council =

Supreme Islamic Council may refer to:

- The Gambia Supreme Islamic Council
- Islamic Supreme Council of Iraq
- Supreme Islamic Shia Council
- Nigerian Supreme Council for Islamic Affairs
- Supreme Muslim Council
- Islamic Supreme Council of Canada
- Islamic Supreme Council of America
- Ethiopian Islamic Affairs Supreme Council
