= Addis Alem =

Addis Alem is the name of several towns in Ethiopia:

- Addis Alem, Shewa (also known as Ejersa), the largest and best known, located in the Oromia Region
- Addis Alem, Agew Awi, located in the southwestern Amhara Region
- Addis Alem, Gojjam, located in the southern Amhara Region
- Addis Alem, one of the neighborhoods of Gondar
