= Walmara =

District in Oromia Region, Ethiopia

Coordinates: 8°55′N 38°35′E

Walmara (Oromo: Walmaraa) is a woreda in the Oromia Special Zone Surrounding Finfinne, Oromia Region, Ethiopia. It is bordered on the south by the Sebeta Hawas, on the west by West Shewa Zone, on the north by Mulo, on the northeast by the Sululta, and on the east by the city of Addis Ababa. Towns in Walmara include Kolobo and Holeta.

The highest point in this woreda is Mount Sabata (3,191 meters), located in the southern part of the district. The Sebeta Hawas National Forest covers the southern and western slopes of this mountain; it is 2500 hectares in size. Other notable peaks include Mount Sabata (between 2800 and 2900 meters).

== Demographics ==
The 2007 national census reported the district's population as 83,823, of whom 42,115 were men and 41,708 were women; 3,352 or 4% of its population were urban dwellers. The majority (86.72%) of the inhabitants said they practised Ethiopian Orthodox Christianity, while 6.36% of the population practiced traditional beliefs, and 4.61% were Protestant.

Based on figures published by the Central Statistical Agency in 2005, this district has an estimated total population of 161,117, of whom 81,470 are men and 79,647 are women; 52,252 or 32.43% of its population are urban dwellers, which is greater than the Zone average of 12.3%. With an estimated area of 736.88 square kilometers, Walmara has an estimated population density of 218.6 people per square kilometer, which is greater than the Zone average of 152.8.

The 1994 national census reported a total population for this district of 108,457, of whom 53,412 were men and 55,045 women; 29,225 or 26.95% of its population were urban dwellers at the time. The four largest ethnic groups reported in Walmara were the Oromo (74.29%), the Amhara (15.88%), the Sebat Bet Gurage (6.33%), and the Tigrayan (1.33%); all other ethnic groups made up 2.17% of the population. Oromo was spoken as a first language by 70.1%, 24.22% spoke Amharic, 3.56% spoke Sebat Bet Gurage, and 1.06% spoke Tigrinya; the remaining 1.06% spoke all other primary languages reported. The majority of the inhabitants professed Ethiopian Orthodox Christianity, with 93.72% of the population reporting they practiced that belief, while 3.8% of the population said they were Muslim, and 1.83% were Protestant.
