= Jeldu =

District in Oromia, Ethiopia

Coordinates: 9°15′N 38°00′E

Jeldu is one of the districts in the Oromia region of Ethiopia. Part of the West Shewa Zone, Jeldu is bordered on the south by Dendi, on the southwest by Elfata, on the north by Ginde Beret, on the northeast by Meta Robi, and on the southeast by Ejerie. Towns in Jeldu include, Gojo, Osole, and Shekute, Boni.

In November 2008, woreda officials announced the completion of a 1.5 million Birr project to improve the access to safe water in Jeldu, which included installing 13 kilometers of water pipelines, building seven water distribution centers, and constructing a water reservoir with a capacity of 75,000 liters. Funding came from the Rotary Foundation, The Hunger Project, and Ethiopian sources. Woreda officials announced the following year that health station, nine health posts, 16 spring waters, four farmers training centers and 45 kilometers of road were completed at a cost of 8 million Birr.

== Demographics ==
The 2007 national census reported a total population for this woreda of 202,716, of whom 99,896 were men and 102,820 were women; 14,384 or 7.1% of its population were urban dwellers. The majority of the inhabitants said they practised Ethiopian Orthodox Christianity, with 49.89% of the population reporting they observed this belief, while 36.94% of the population were Protestant, and 12.8% practiced traditional religions.

Based on figures published by the Central Statistical Agency in 2005, this woreda has an estimated total population of 202,024, of whom 103,150 were males and 98,874 were females; 12,456 or 6.17% of its population are urban dwellers, which is less than the Zone average of 12.3%. With an estimated area of 1,329.22 square kilometers, Jeldu has an estimated population density of 152 people per square kilometer, which is about the same as the Zone average of 152.8.

The 1994 national census reported a total population for this woreda of 144,934, of whom 71,280 were men and 73,654 women; 6,972 or 4.81% of its population were urban dwellers at the time. The two largest ethnic groups reported in Jeldu were the Oromo (96.51%), and the Amhara (3.3%); all other ethnic groups made up 0.19% of the population. Oromiffa was spoken as a first language by 98.63%, and 1.32% spoke Amharic; the remaining 0.05% spoke all other primary languages reported. The majority of the inhabitants professed Ethiopian Orthodox Christianity, with 76.17% of the population reporting they practiced that belief, while 14.01% of the population said they practiced traditional beliefs, and 9.51% were Protestant.
