= Abuna Ginde Beret =

District in Oromia, Ethiopia

Coordinates: 9°37′N 37°58′E

Abuna Ginde Beret is one of the districts in the Oromia Region of Ethiopia. It is part of the West Shewa Zone. It was part of Ginde Beret woreda until 1997 G C and Abuna Ginde Beret was established in 1997. Bake Kelate is the town of Abuna Ginde Beret.

== Demographics ==
The 2007 national census reported a total population for this woreda of 109,275, of whom 53,436 were men and 55,839 were women; 2,705 or 2.48% of its population were urban dwellers. The majority of the inhabitants were Protestant, with 42.2% of the population reporting they observed this belief, while 46.07% of the population said they practised Ethiopian Orthodox Christianity, and 11.08% practiced traditional religions.
