= Sebeta Hawas =

District in Oromia Region, Ethiopia

Coordinates: 8°45′N 38°40′E

Sebata Hawas, also spelled Sabbataa Awaas (Oromo: Saabataa Haawaass), is a woreda in Oromia Region, Ethiopia. Part of the Oromia Special Zone Surrounding Finfinne, Alem Gena is on the southwest by Southwest Shewa Zone, on the northwest by Walmara, on the north by Burayu, on the northeast by the city of Addis Ababa, and on the east by the Akaki. The Awash River defines this woreda's boundary with south west Shewa Zone. The towns in Sebeta Hawas include Sebeta Hawas (Town), Awash Melka, and Tefki. The town of Sebeta was separated from this district.

The altitude of district ranges from 1700 metres above sea level to about 3385 metres. Rivers include the Sebeta. According to the district Agricultural and Rural Development Office, 87.2% of the land is devoted to agriculture, 4.2% is pasture, 2.9% is forest, 1.86% is reserved for industrial establishment, 1.68% is covered by lakes and other bodies of water, and built-up land covers 1.28%.

== Demographics ==
The 2007 national census reported this district's population as 132,294, of whom 68,133 were men and 64,161 women; 7,359 or 5.56% of its population were urban dwellers. The majority of the inhabitants (87.44%) said they practised Ethiopian Orthodox Christianity, while 5.37% of the population were Muslim, 4.57% observed traditional beliefs, and 2.44% were Protestant.

Based on figures published by the Central Statistical Agency in 2005, this district has an estimated total population of 171,827, of whom 85,493 are men and 86,334 are women; 41,598 or 24.21% of its population are urban dwellers, which is greater than the Zone average of 12.3%. With an estimated area of 875.32 square kilometers, Alem Gena has an estimated population density of 196.3 people per square kilometer, which is greater than the Zone average of 152.8.

The 1994 national census reported a total population for this district of 118,099, of whom 59,488 were men and 58,611 women; 23,296 or 19.73% of its population were urban dwellers at the time. The six largest ethnic groups reported in Alem Gena were the Oromo (67.37%), the Amhara (17.91%), the Sebat Bet Gurage (4.54%), the Soddo Gurage (4.43%), the Werji (2.5%), and the Gamo (1.02%); all other ethnic groups made up 2.23% of the population. Oromo was spoken as a first language by 66.46%, 25.65% spoke Amharic, 3.27% Soddo Gurage, 2.18% Sebat Bet Gurage, and 1.02% Gamo; the remaining 1.42% spoke all other primary languages reported. The majority of the inhabitants professed Ethiopian Orthodox Christianity, with 91.89% of the population reporting they practiced that belief, while 6.27% of the population said they were Muslim, 1.03% were Protestant, and 0.72% observed traditional beliefs.
