= Jeberti people =

Muslim clan in Northeast africa, The Horn of Africa, and the Arabian Peninsula

Jeberti
الجبرتي

Regions with significant populations
- Horn of Africa & South Arabia

Languages
- Tigrinya, Arabic, Somali

Religion
- Islam

Jeberti also Jaberti or Jabarti (Arabic: الجبرتي, romanized: al-Jabartī, also pronounced Gabarti in Egyptian colloquial Arabic) are a Muslim clan inhabiting the Horn of Africa and Southern Arabia, mainly Somalia, Ethiopia, Eritrea, Yemen and Oman.

== Etymology ==
The earliest mention of the term "Jabart" appears in Ptolemy’s Geographia, where he references a region, Gabartus Mons, which he places about 250 miles from Avalites, with the actual distance being 225 miles, indicating a reasonably accurate ancient mapping. The region, situated by the Gulf of Aden, is associated with the myrrh country, a known trade area in the Horn of Africa.

The Arabic term "al-Jabartī" (الجبرتي) may derive from "Jabart" or "Jabarah," which medieval Arab geographers and historians used to describe the region, particularly the lowland, semi-arid to desert areas around Zeila and extending further into eastern Ethiopian territories. This vast area was characterized by its intense heat, leading to the descriptor "the burning land" or "Guban."

== History ==
Islam was in the Horn of Africa early on from the Arabian Peninsula, shortly after the hijra. Zeila's Masjid al-Qiblatayn dates back to the 7th century, and is one of the oldest mosques in Africa. In the late 9th century, Al-Yaqubi wrote that Muslims were living along the northern Somali seaboard. Among these early migrants was Abdirahman bin Isma'il al-Jabarti, the forefather of the Darod clan family. Al-Maqrizi noted that a number of the Muslims settled in the Zeila-controlled Gabarta region which is presently northeastern Somalia, and from there gradually expanded into the hinterland in the Horn of Africa. Jeberti are also linked to the Harla people and Afar.

At the time, a merchant class developed in the region known as Jabarti. Largely in response to a long-held Ethiopian aversion to trade as an occupation, the Muslim principalities expanded towards the Awash River and beyond. The Zara Yaqob chronicles also mentions the Abyssinian province of Gabar-ge being ruled by a Hegano.

The Jabarti are the second biggest clan in terms of population and land size in Somalia and a large minority in Yemen, Oman, Eritrea, Ethiopia, and Kenya. Most Jabarti concentrated cities include Asmara, Addis Ababa, Kismayo, Badhan, Garowe, Lasanod, Garbaharrey, Jigjiga, Bosaso, Bardera, Buraan, Garissa, Daleti and Salalah.

== Language ==
The Somali Jabarti clan family speak Somali and Arabic. In Eritrea and Ethiopia they mainly speak Tigrinya and Arabic.

== See also ==
- Somali people
- Habesha peoples
- Harla people
