= Akaki (woreda) =

District in Oromia Region, Ethiopia

Coordinates: 8°50′N 38°50′E

Akaki (Oromo: Aqaaqii) is a woreda or district in Oromia Region, Ethiopia. Part of the Oromia Special Zone Surrounding Finfinne, Akaki is bordered on the southwest by the Southwest Shewa Zone, on the west by Sebeta Hawas, on the northwest by Addis Ababa, on the north by the Bereh, and on the east by East Shewa Zone. The administrative center of this woreda is Dukem.

== Overview ==
The altitude of this woreda ranges from 1500 to 2300 metres above sea level. Mount Yerer, on the border with Ada'a Chukala, is the highest point in Akaki; other notable peaks include Guji, Bilbilo and Bushu. Rivers include the Akaki, Dukem, and Awash. Important forests include the government-protected Yerer and Addis Baha forests. A survey of the land in this woreda shows that 72.2% is arable or cultivable, 7.6% pasture, 4.4% forest, and the remaining 15.8% is considered swampy, degraded or otherwise unusable. Lentils, chickpeas and fenugreek are important cash crops.

Industry in the woreda includes 3 licensed miners, 11 small industries employing 71 people, and 694 registered businesses including 44 wholesalers, 139 retailers and 115 service providers. There were 25 Farmers Associations with 10,853 members and 13 Farmers Service Cooperatives with 8549 members. Akaki has 85 kilometers of dry-weather and 35 all-weather road, for an average of road density of 210 kilometers per 1000 square kilometres. About 16% of the rural 100% of the urban and 23% of the total population has access to drinking water.

== History ==
A local landmark is Oda Nabi, which is where the Machaa and Tulama groups held their chefe assemblies together before the Macha crossed the Guder River during the Robale Gadaa (1570–1578) and Oda Nabi became too far for them to travel every eighth year.

Located in Akaki woreda is the Aba Samuel hydroelectric power plant, named after a nearby church. The complex includes the first dam built in the Awash valley, though it is actually on the Akaki river, constructed by the Italians in 1939, and the lake created by the dam has a storage capacity of 40,000 cubic meters. Originally a 6,600 kW hydro-electric plant, it was enlarged in the early 1950s so that it produced 20 million kWh a year by 1955. In the early 1940s, the British attempted to carry away vital parts of the electrical generator, but were stopped after a few minute's battle with the police of Addis Ababa.

== Demographics ==
The 2007 national census reported this woreda's population as 77,836, of whom 40,241 were men and 37,595 women; 6,670 or 8.57% of its population were urban dwellers. The overwhelming majority of the inhabitants (85.86%) said they practised Ethiopian Orthodox Christianity, while 10.56% of the population were Protestant, and 3.34% were Muslim.

Based on figures from the Central Statistical Agency in 2005, this woreda has an estimated total population of 74,020, of whom 38,092 are men and 35,928 are women. With an estimated area of 571.41 square kilometers, Akaki has a population density of 129.5 people per square kilometer which is less than the Zone average of 181.7.

The 1994 national census reported a total population for this woreda of 53,886, of whom 27,902 were men and 25,984 women; no urban dwellers were reported in this woreda at the time. The three largest ethnic groups reported in Akaki were the Oromo (81.24%), the Amhara (17.1%), and the Werji (0.81%); all other ethnic groups made up 0.85% of the population. Oromiffa was spoken as a first language by 81.42%, and 18.14% spoke Amharic; the remaining 0.44% spoke all other primary languages reported. The majority of the inhabitants were Ethiopian Orthodox Christianity, with 96.66% of the population reporting they practiced that belief, while 1.83% of the population said they were Moslem, and 1.03% practiced traditional beliefs.

== See also ==
- Oromia
- Oromia Special Zone surrounding Finfinne
