= Oromia–Addis Ababa relations =

Relations of Ethiopian capital Addis Ababa and regional state Oromia Region

The relations between Oromia and Addis Ababa has been great controversy as the subject sparked historical revisionism in the linkage of history of Addis Ababa. The area in the present day Addis Ababa called Finfinne where various Oromo pastoralists inhabited the region, and the emergence of Abyssinian expansionism under Emperor Menelik II which renamed the area as Addis Ababa in 1886. Throughout the 20th century, Addis Ababa was governed as the capital city of the Ethiopia under urban influence.

Map of Oromia Region (left) and Addis Ababa (right)

After the Ethiopian People's Revolutionary Democratic Front (EPRDF) came to power in 1991, Addis Ababa defined as chartered city, along with Dire Dawa in accordance with Proclamation No. 7/1992 of Transitional Government Charter. Article 3(4) of the Ethiopian Constitution defines in relation with Oromia Region, "the special interest and political right of the Oromo over Region 13 [Harari] and Region 14 [Addis Ababa]" since the city is located within Oromia Region border.

Since then, there were considerable controversies over the status of Addis Ababa. In 2000, Oromia's capital was moved from Addis Ababa to Adama, sparking protests and demonstrations in the Oromia Region. In 2005, Addis Ababa was returned to Oromia capital after the EPRDF coalition lost the then election's parliamentary seats of Addis Abeba to opposition parties, mainly Kinijit(Coalition for Unity and Democracy).

In 2014, the government proposed master plan to expand Addis Ababa's boundary into Oromia Special Zone by 1.1 million hectares, culminated the 2014–2016 Oromo protests.

== Historical perspective ==
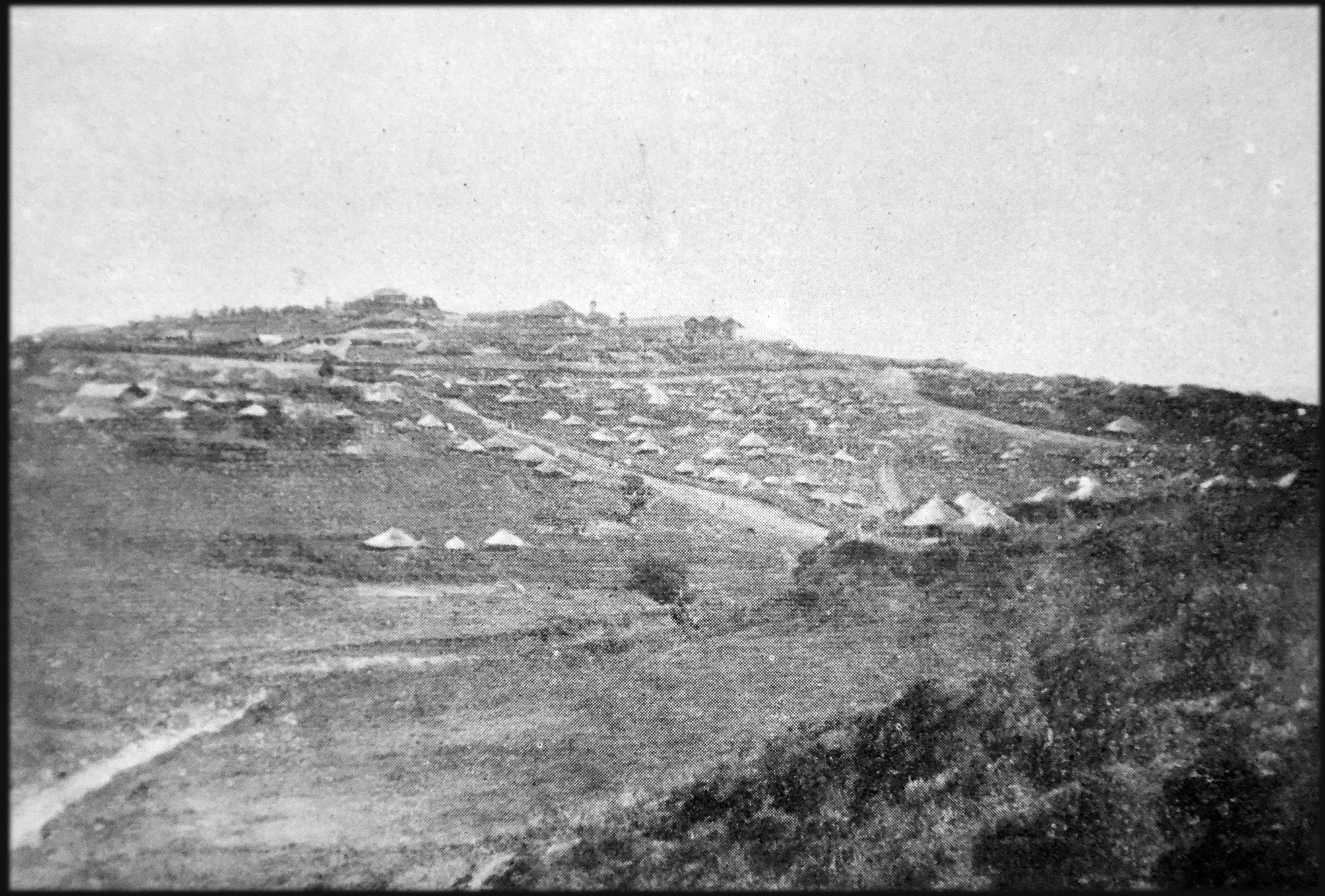
Distance view of Addis Ababa showing Menelik Palace

Addis Ababa foundation traced back to Emperor Menelik II's conquest of Oromo lands and other tribal realms in the late 19th century. Before its establishment, the area was called Finfinne where various Oromo pastoralists inhabited the area. Beginning with 1860s, Menelik's grandfather was one of the first person to visit the Finfinne plain and wished to build capital city. This was followed by confiscation of pasture land from the Finfinne plain, culminating in Oromo revolt against the system that distributed their land for ploughing and pasture in 1869.

The king successfully suppressed the revolt by sending soldiers to the area and ushered Catholic mission at Birbirsa in the site of today's St. George's Cathedral. This event stirred Menelik to transfer his capital to Entoto in 1881, used as strategic garrison base for his military camp against foreign incursion. Uncomfortable and uneven climate condition of Entoto, which consisted windy and coldly and the presence of hot spring in the area led to establish the present Addis Ababa in 1886, along with his wife Taytu Betul.

From its early stages, Addis Ababa saw economic exploitation and political control over the Oromo realm, which earned to become center of the Ethiopian Empire. To continue economic and political dominance, the Amhara conquerors established military garrison called ketemas originally called "erected as control points". Ketemas ruled as organizer of the imperial administration to rule the conquered territories. They became political, administrative, military, social and cultural outposts for the imperial system.

Following the dissolution of the Derg in 1991, the ruling coalition Ethiopian People's Revolutionary Democratic Front (EPRDF) convened national conference in July 1991 that adopted Transitional Charter, which served as the law of the land until December 1994 when newly elected parliament ratified the current Ethiopian constitution.

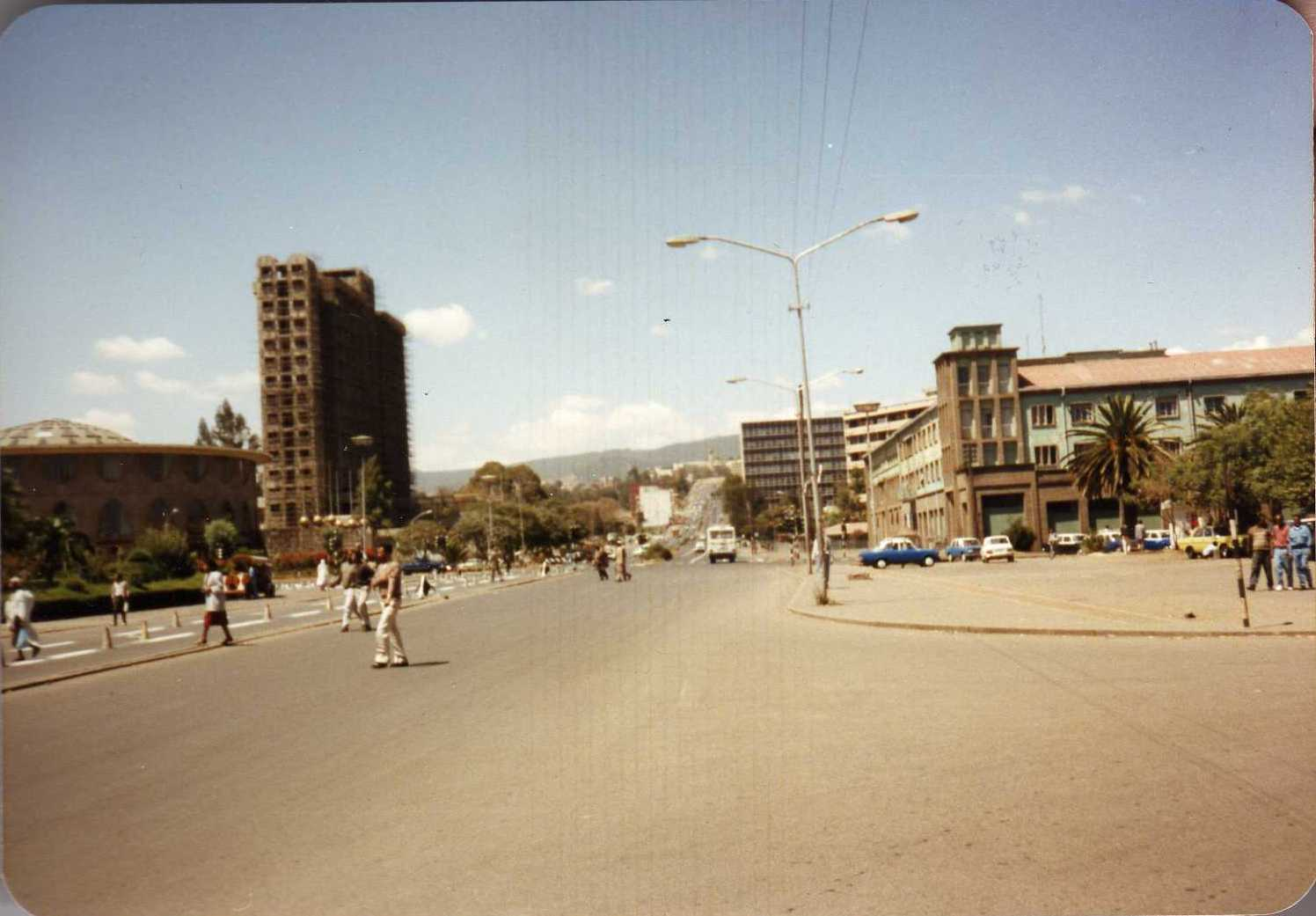
Addis Ababa in 1993

The charter recognized unconditional right to self-determination of nation, nationality, and people in Ethiopia, which placed the country into multi-ethnic federation. Accordingly, the Proclamation No. 7/1992 established National Self-Governments in January 1992 that divided the country into 9 ethnic regional states and two chartered cities: Addis Ababa and Dire Dawa. The Charter allowed Addis Ababa self-governing city in the Article 3(4) which defines in relation with Oromia Region "the special interest and political right of the Oromo over Region 13 [Harari] and Region 14 [Addis Ababa]" since the city is located within Oromia Region border.

In 2000, the EPRDF passed constitutional resolution to move Oromia's capital from Addis Ababa to Adama, generating widespread opposition from Oromo groups in the region. Following the move, peaceful demonstration was organized by the Mecha and Tulama Self-Help Association, which declared openly condemning the move as "illegal" and "unconstitutional". The government responded by brutal attack on protestors by security forces: 360 Oromo students were expelled from Addis Ababa University without any explanation.

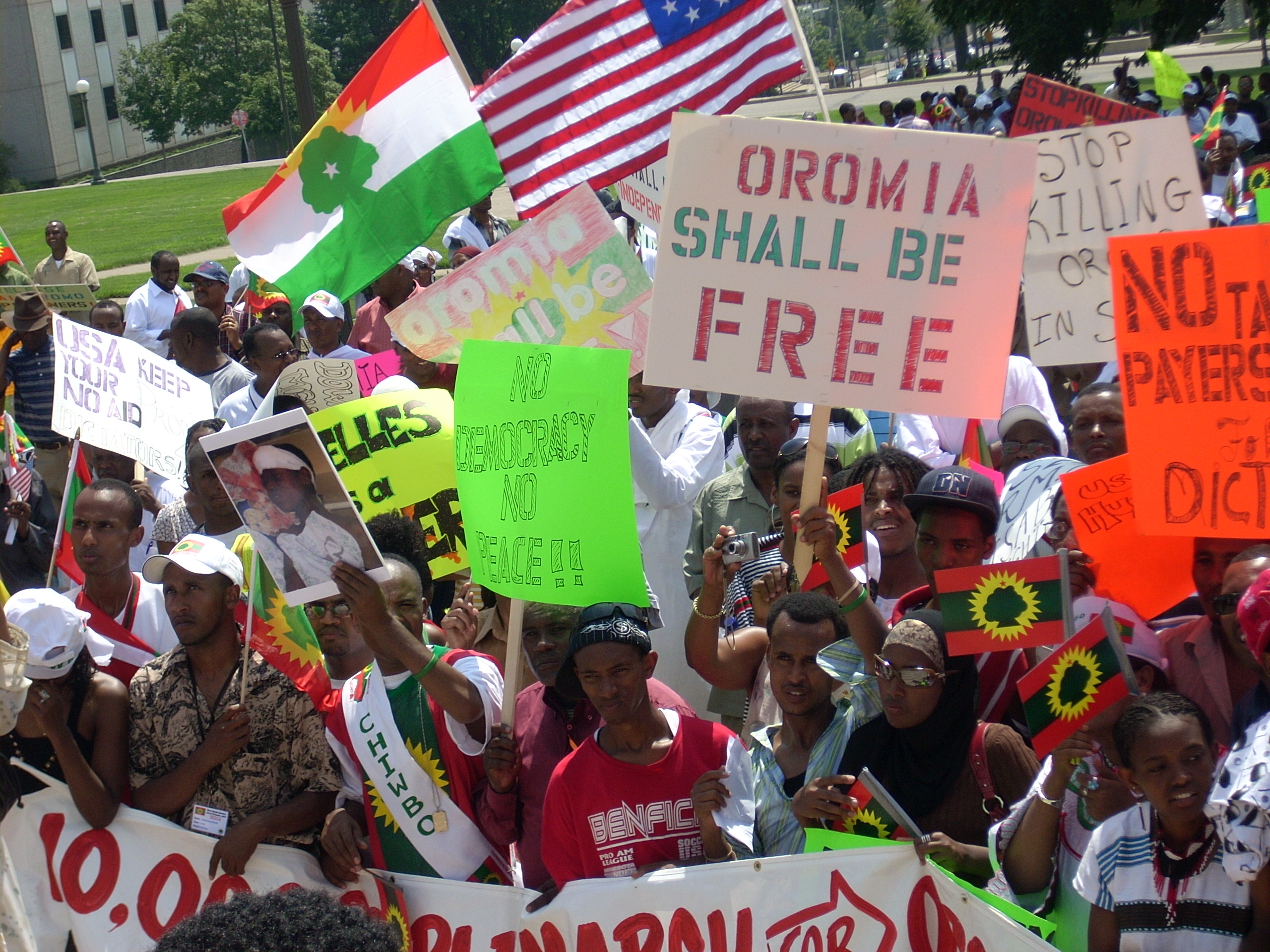
Oromo protests in 2007

On 10 June 2005, because of sparked controversy and protests among Oromo students and parties such as the Oromo People's Democratic Organization (OPDO), the capital transferred back to Addis Ababa. However, this was a desperate maneuver the ruling EPRDF deliberated upon losing the capital city parliamentary votes to the opposition Kinijit(CUD) party..

In April 2014, another controversy was ignited when EPRDF proposed master plan for Addis Ababa to expand by 1.1 million hectares into Oromia Special Zone, culminated in popular protests across Oromia Region. Protests resumed through 2015 and 2016, particularly in Ginchi and spread through 400 different locales across 17 zones of the Oromia Region. Amnesty International reported that 800 protestors were killed by security forces. On 12 January 2016, the Oromo Democratic Party (ODP) said that the plan was fully "terminated" after extensive meetings with government officials who rejected it.

== Political status ==
Oromia and Addis Ababa political relations has been national controversy over last couple decade. The city is located in Oromia, but affected the socio-economic and political factors in the Region. Addis Ababa constitutionally defined as a self-governing city with its status interrelated to "special interest" of Oromia and the interest of the federal government. Though the degree of involvement of Oromia lacks precision, attempts are made to define the role of the federal government in the city. The special interest of Oromia not clearly defined, which instigate these suspicion of relationship of Oromia and Addis Ababa. Constitutionally, Addis Ababa can be defined geographically as "special interest" to Oromia through social services and joint consumption of natural resources, as ratified by Article 49(5).
