= Dendi (woreda) =

District in Oromia Region, Ethiopia

Coordinates: 8°55′N 38°10′E

Dendi is a woreda in Oromia Region, Ethiopia. Part of the West Shewa Zone, Dendi is bordered on the south by the Southwest Shewa Zone, on the west by Naannawa Ambo, on the north by Jeldu, and on the east by Ejerie. The administrative center of this woreda is Ginchi; other towns in Dendi include Olonkomi. Elfata Aanaa was separated from Dendi.

== Overview ==
The highest point in this woreda is Mount Dendi (3260 meters), located on the border with Wonchi woreda. Notable landscape features include the Chilimo forest, a wooded area 2400 hectares in size near Ginchi, which is a remnant of the dry afromontane forest on the Ethiopian Central Plateau.

The major micro-finance institutions operating in Dendi are the Oromiyaa Credit and Saving SC, Busa Gonofa and Saving Institution SC, and the Africa Mender Association. These institutions reported 9 April 2008 that for the previous fiscal year they extended loans totaling 11,106,190 Birr to 8,571 low income individuals in the woreda. On 2 August 2009, ANMOL Products, an Indian corporation, inaugurated a paper mill in Ginchi. Ethiopian demand for paper is estimated at more than 70,000 tons per year, while production inside the country is less than 20,000 tons; the new paper mill has the capacity to produce 15,000 tons of paper a year, substantially narrowing the gap, while employing 200 people.

== Demographics ==
The 2007 national census reported this woreda's population as 165,803, of whom 83,988 were men and 81,815 women; 25,322 or 15.27% of its population were urban dwellers. The majority of the inhabitants (84.98%) said they practiced Ethiopian Orthodox Christianity, while 8.47% of the population practiced traditional beliefs, and 5.11% were Protestant.

Based on figures published by the Central Statistical Agency in 2005, this woreda has an estimated total population of 255,896, of whom 129,226 are men and 126,670 are women; 29,602 or 11.57% of its population are urban dwellers, which is less than the Zone average of 12.3%. With an estimated area of 1,549.07 square kilometers, Dendi has an estimated population density of 165.2 people per square kilometer, which is greater than the Zone average of 152.8.

The 1994 national census reported a total population for this woreda of 181,288, of whom 90,132 were men and 91,156 women; 16,581 or 9.15% of its population were urban dwellers at the time. The two largest ethnic groups reported in Dendi were the Oromo (91.97%), and the Amhara (6.9%); all other ethnic groups made up 1.12% of the population. Oromiffa was spoken as a first language by 93.17%, and 6.37% spoke Amharic; the remaining 0.46% spoke all other primary languages reported. The majority of the inhabitants professed Ethiopian Orthodox Christianity, with 88.42% of the population reporting they practiced that belief, while 7.34% practiced traditional beliefs, and 3.06% of the population said they were Protestant
