= Durba =

Town in Oromia Region, Ethiopia

Galan Dubra (Oromo)
- Town
- Location within Ethiopia Galan (Africa)
- Coordinates: 8°49′36.21″N 38°51′33.59″E
- Country: Ethiopia
- Region: Oromia
- Zone: Oromia Special Zone Surrounding Finfinne
- Time zone: UTC+3 (EAT)

Dubra (Oromo: "virgin") is a town in central Ethiopia. Located in the Oromia Special Zone Surrounding Finfinne, about 70 km north of Addis Ababa, this town has a latitude and longitude of 9°26′N 38°39′E with an elevation of 2450 meters above sea level. The town sits above the canyon of the Muger River, near the largest falls of the Muger.

Dubra is important for being one of the major sites for the production of cement in Ethiopia. In 2006, the Muger Cement Factory plant announced it would expand its facilities. In 2008, Mohammed Al-Amoudi's Derba Midroc Cement company announced it would establish its own cement factory 8 km from Durba.

Based on figures from the Central Statistical Agency in 2005, Dubra has an estimated total population of 2,188 of whom 1,053 were men and 1,135 were women. The 1994 census reported this town had a total population of 1,225 of whom 571 were men and 654 were women. It is one of six towns in Mulona Sululta woreda.

== See also ==
- Muger Cement FC
