= Chebi =

Chebi may refer to:

- ChEBI, Chemical Entities of Biological Interest
- Chebi Khan (fl. 630-650), a claimant of the title of khan of Eastern Turkic Khaganate after the collapse of Xueyantuo
- Chebi, Ethiopia, a town in Jeldu woreda, Ethiopia
- Typhoon Chebi (2001)
- Typhoon Chebi (2006)
- Chebi, an English name for the Russian character Cheburashka
