= Elfata =

Woreda (district) in the Oromia Region of Ethiopia

Elfata is one of the woredas in the Oromia Region of Ethiopia. It is part of the West Shewa Zone. It was part of Dendi woreda.

== Demographics ==
The 2007 national census reported a total population for this woreda of 57,389, of whom 28,630 were men and 28,759 women; 1,898 or 3.31% of its population were urban dwellers. 47.53% of the inhabitants said they practiced Ethiopian Orthodox Christianity, while 43.41% of the population were Protestant, and 8.7% practiced traditional religions.
