= Amharization =

Process of establishing Amhara dominance in Ethiopia

Amharization is the process by which Amhara traditions, culture and language are elevated above over ethnic groups in Ethiopia. During Imperial rule, Amhara enjoyed greater influence, imposing Amharic language and culture and dominating politics. Amhara elites aspired to build the Ethiopian nation. Amhara dominance lasted from the Derg era until 1991.

The Tigrayan-led EPRDF regime attempted to end Amharization and implement ethnic federalism under the constitution. However, the constitution failed to solve protracted conflicts and further heightened tension among ethnic groups. TPLF also used the divide and rule mechanism and made Tigrayans in politics.

== Background ==
Amhara dominance continued during the Imperial era. For instance, under Emperor Haile Selassie, Amharization took place by implementing Amharic language, culture, religion, and tradition. In 1967, the government imprisoned leaders of Mecha and Tulama Self-Help Association, an Oromo nationalist groups that advocated for Ethiopian nationalism. As crackdowns became tighter, Oromo nationalism grew, leading to the formation of Oromo Liberation Front (OLF) in 1973. The Amhara also exerted influence during the Derg era, advocating an "indivisible" Greater Ethiopian empire, despite opposition by Eritrean nationalists and an ongoing civil war. Amhara rule ended when EPRDF won victory against Mengistu in 1991.

After the collapse of the Derg regime in May 1991, the FDRE constitution accorded the rights of assimilation of Amhara people on the basis of their language and culture. A 2023 study reported that Aari (also Ari) people in Southwest Ethiopia forcefully adopted Amhara culture and their religion, including Orthodox Christianity due to centuries-old humiliation and marginalization by Amhara.

== See also ==
- Oromization
