= Koye Feche =

Town in Oromia Region, Ethiopia

Koye Feche Koyyee Faccee (Oromo)
- Sub-city
- Location within Ethiopia Koye Feche (Africa)
- Coordinates: 8°53′22.13″N 38°50′27.46″E
- Country: Ethiopia
- Region: Oromia
- Zone: Oromia Special Zone Surrounding Finfinne
- Time zone: UTC+3 (EAT)

Koye Feche Sub-city (Oromo: Koyyee Faccee) is a town in the new Sheger City of Oromia Region, Ethiopia, formerly located in the Oromia Special Zone Surrounding Finfinne.

== Protests ==
On 7 March 2019, thousands of angry citizens took to the streets to protest in several cities and towns across the Oromia state such as Jimma, Ambo, Awaday, Bale Robe and Adama after Addis Ababa city administration allocated thousands of condominium buildings located in Koye Fache to bidders.

Addis Ababa city administration is acting outside of its jurisdiction and without involving Oromia regional government. Many are carrying banners reading “our land is our bones,” “Koye Feche is in Oromia”, and “No to the master plan”. — protesters

Oromia government opposed transferring the houses built within Oromia boundary. Several activists insisted that the housing units should be allotted to the uprooted local farmers; this view was also emphasised by the state government and its ruling party.
