= Hayelom Araya =

Ethiopian militant (1955–1996)

Hadush "Hayelom" Araya
- ሓዱሽ ሓየሎም አርአያ
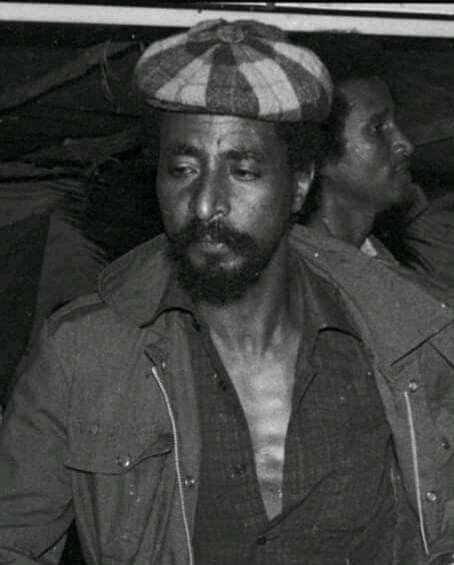
- Picture of Hayelom Araya (late 1980s)
- Born: 1955; Addi Nebreid, Tigray Province, Ethiopian Empire
- Died: 14 February 1996 (aged 40–41); Addis Ababa, Ethiopia
- Military career
- Allegiance: Tigray People's Liberation Front, Ethiopian People's Revolutionary Democratic Front
- Branch: Tigray People's Liberation Front later Ethiopian National Defense Force
- Service years: 1970s–1996
- Rank: Major General
- Nicknames: Hayelom (ሓየሎም, "Overpowering")
- Unit: TPLF / EPRDF forces
- Conflicts: Ethiopian Civil War; Agazi Operation (1985)
- Memorials: Monument in Shire; General Hayelom Araya Airport (Shire Indaselassie)

Mējeri jēnerali Hadush "Hayelom" Araya (1955– 14 February 1996) was an Ethiopian militant and member of the Tigrayan People's Liberation Front (TPLF), which was the leading member of the Ethiopian People's Revolutionary Democratic Front (EPRDF), known for his daring combat operations and leadership during the Ethiopian Civil War. While fighting as a TPLF fighter, he earned the nickname Hayelom, "Overpowering" for his brave and daring acts.

== Military career ==
Rising rapidly through its ranks, he led the bold "Agazi Operation" on the early evening of 5 February 1985, in which his unit stormed the Mek'ele prison, freed over 1,000 political prisoners, killed 16 guards, and wounded nine soldiers—all reportedly without suffering a casualty—a feat that boosted morale and became legendary.

After the Agazi Operation, he was assigned broader coordination over TPLF’s northeastern sector, liaising directly with other field commanders to plan multi‑front offensives. During the late 1980s, he directed TPLF efforts to advance on key regional targets, including Welkait–Shewa corridors, ensuring that its mobile columns maintained supply lines and synchronization with EPRDF allies. He also conducted coordination with political cadre units responsible for organizing liberated zones, blending military action with governance preparations.

As commander of EPRDF forces, General Hayelom led his forces to northern Shewa and later marched to Addis Ababa, leading to the fall of the Derg regime. Following the Derg’s overthrow, Araya was appointed among the senior officers to reconstitute the Transitional Government of Ethiopia's new national defense apparatus, drawing TPLF divisions into the formal structure of the Ethiopian National Defense Force (ENDF). He played a central role in merging TPLF combat brigades with other former rebel groups and state forces—aiming to turn partisan units into a unified national army.

Hayelom’s responsibilities during this phase included overseeing military training programs, establishing regional command structures, and advising on integration policies for demobilized fighters. According to multiple historical accounts, he was widely respected across Tigray and other EPRDF constituencies for his emphasis on discipline, chain of command, and unified chain of command.

Throughout this time, he balanced military professionalism with regional identity—ensuring that Tigray-oriented units remained integrated but also preserved local roots—reflecting the Front’s strategy of federalism and unity under EPRDF ideology.

== Death ==
On 14 February 1996, Araya was shot and killed at close range in a restaurant bar in Addis Ababa. The motive for the killing remains unconfirmed. However, a prominent Eritrean businessman named Jemil Yassin Mohamed was convicted of his murder in April 1996.

In June 1998, Jemil Yassin was executed for the murder, prompting criticism from human rights groups including Amnesty International over issues of due process and legal transparency. Interestingly, the timing of the execution is linked to the outbreak of the Eritrean-Ethiopian border war in May 1998. Unofficial sources—including investigative commentary—suggest possible involvement of Eritrean intelligence and coordination by security officials, although these remain unverified.

== Legacy ==
Hayelom's tactical operations and strategic oversight are frequently cited in historical studies of the Ethiopian Civil War, highlighting his impact on TPLF’s strategic doctrine and identity formation.

His legacy remains prominent in Tigray’s collective memory, frequently commemorated in school programs, veterans’ memoirs, and oral histories documenting the Tigrayan liberation struggle. Public tributes and social media commemorations, including annual posts and shared photographs of his service and martyrdom, reflect his symbolic role in Tigrayan history.

In May 2008, a monument honouring him was unveiled in the major city of Shire, Ethiopia. Statues depicting him—often holding a radio or walkie‑talkie—is publicly displayed in Shire alongside the city's airport named after him. There is also a military training institution in Holeta named after him, intended for training future officers within a regionally oriented framework. These commemorations reflect his symbolic status within Tigray and Ethiopian military history.

== See also ==
- Ethiopian Civil War
- Tigray People's Liberation Front
- Ethiopian National Defence Forces
- Holeta
