= Oromization =

Exertion and dominance of Oromo in Ethiopia

Oromization is a process of making and assimilating Oromo culture, language supremacy above other ethnic groups in Ethiopia. It is type of subjective political discourse than academic concepts based on common narratives about Ethiopian statehood and Abyssinian colonialism since 19th century. Oromization is a reversal of Amharization.

In August 2020 voice recording captured a private meeting where Shimelis Abdisa, president of regional state of Oromia expressed his belief that the ruling Prosperity Party aims to shape Ethiopia according to Oromo culture, potentially sidelining other ethnic groups in the country.

== Background ==
After the collapse of the Derg regime in May 1991, the FDRE constitution accorded the rights of assimilation of Oromo people on the basis of their language and culture (See Nations, Nationalities and Peoples). This allowed Oromo nationalism to uphold in the regime. Oromization is a political discourse than academic concepts that resonance common narratives about prejudice by Abyssinian elites. In the 21st-century, the process of Oromo superiority has been surged particularly during Prime Minister Abiy Ahmed leadership since 2018. During these periods, several towns in central Ethiopia has been changed to Oromo language, such as Ziway to Batu and Awra Godana, in the Amhara Region into Kore. Addis Ababa also targeted to Oromization, asserting that Amhara controlled and owned the city for centuries. Oromia flags and anthems imposed to violate the constitution which is condemned by political parties like EZEMA. The Ethiopian Ombudsman also denounced that "there is no legal or moral ground to impose a flag and anthem from Oromia on schools in Addis Ababa".

== See also ==
- Amharization
