= Mulo (woreda) =

District in Oromia Region, Ethiopia

Mulo is a woreda of the Oromia Special Zone surrounding Finfinne in Oromia Region, Ethiopia. It was part of the former Mulona Sululta woreda. It is bordered by Welmera, Adea Berga, Sululta and Yaya Gulele woredas. It is located to the west of Addis Ababa, the capital city of the Federal Democratic Republic of Ethiopia.

== Kebeles ==
List of Kebeles under Mulo Woreda.

1. Mulo Fale
2. Mulo Kersa
3. Mulo Silo
4. Dunburii
5. Kura Kemele
6. Mulo Tita
7. Eka Jarso Gebeta
8. Boro Tiro Doroba

== Demographics ==
The 2007 national census reported this woreda's population as 35,138, of whom 17,708 were men and 17,430 women; 2,296 or 6.53% of its population were urban dwellers. The overwhelming majority of the inhabitants (99.27%) said they practised Ethiopian Orthodox Christianity.
