= Ethiopian Islamic Affairs Supreme Council =

Islamic governing body in Ethiopia

- የኢትዮጵያ እስልምና ጉዳዮች ጠቅላይ ምክር ቤት
- Formation: 6 April 1975; 51 years ago
- Type: Islamic Supreme Council
- Purpose: Unifying, strengthening Ethiopian Muslim influence in every level
- Headquarters: Tor Hayloch, Addis Ababa, Ethiopia
- Region served: Worldwide
- President: Doctor Sheikh Haji Ibrahim Tufa
- Deputy Vice-President: Sheikh Abdulkarim Sheikh Bedredin
- Vice-President: Sheikh Abdulaziz Abdulwale
- General-Secretary: Sheikh Hamid Musa
- Website: ethiopianmajlis.org.et

The Ethiopian Islamic Affairs Supreme Council (Amharic: የኢትዮጵያ እስልምና ጉዳዮች ጠቅላይ ምክር ቤት; EIASC) is the central governing body of Islam representing Ethiopian Muslims living in both domestic and foreign countries. It was established following the Ethiopian Revolution in 1975 with intention to unify and serving the Muslim community. In 2012, the House of Peoples' Representatives approved EIASC with Proclamation No. 1207/2020, granting legal responsibility and therefore representing Muslims both domestically and internationally. The current president of EIASC is Doctor Sheikh Haji Ibrahim Tufa since 2022.

== Background ==
The Ethiopian Islamic Affairs Supreme Council was formed following the Ethiopian Revolution on 6 April 1975 with objective of unifying and protecting Muslims in Ethiopia. In February 1975, 9 Muslims were killed and 130 wounded in Grand Anwar Mosque after which violence erupted between two EIASC Muslim group claiming representatives of the council. Throughout half-century, the Majlis has worked over governing with facing endeavors to identify strengths and weaknesses. In 2012, the House of Peoples' Representatives declared Decree No. 1207/2020, which grants legal obligation to the Ethiopian Islamic Affairs Supreme Council. As such, the Supreme Court organizational structure has been modified with law and allowed Muslims to represent in both domestically and internationally.

On 18 July 2022, Sheikh Hajj Ibrahim Tufa elected as the president of EIASC during the meeting in Sheraton Addis. Sheikh Abdulkarim Sheikh Bedredin, Sheikh Abdulaziz Abdulwale, and Sheikh Hamid Musa has been elected as the council's vice presidents and general secretary, respectively. At the moment, President Ibrahim Tufa swore that he would embark its duties and strength unity of Muslims to raise issues of the Council challenges. According to the Ethiopian News Agency, 261 participants took voting to elect executives and general assembly out of the supposed 300.

== See also ==
- Inter-Religious Council of Ethiopia
- Religion in Ethiopia
- Islam in Ethiopia
