= Warjih people =

Ethiopian ethnic group

Warjih
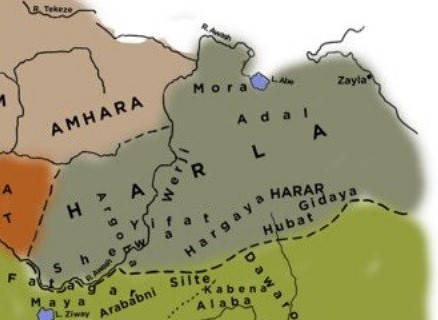
- Location of Warjih region near the Awash River in the middle ages

Total population
- 20,536 (1994 census)

Regions with significant populations
- Ethiopia

Languages
- Amharic, Oromo

Religion
- Islam

Related ethnic groups
- Jebertis, Gurage, Harari, Silte, Afar, Argobba

The Warjih (Arabic: ورجي, Amharic: ወርጂ, Somali: Warjeex [wɔrdʒi]), also known as Wargar are an ethnic group inhabiting Ethiopia.

== History ==
According to the Warjih, their forefathers have two separate origins, one ancestor emerging from Tigray region while the other arrived from Hararghe. The Warjih more commonly state they originate from Harar and set themselves apart from another Muslim trader group called Tegri or Warjih Tegri in the region whom they detest. Warjih are credited for transmitting Semitic influences into Shewa from their departure point in the Harari plateau. The Warjih were among the first people in the Horn of Africa to become Muslim, having accepted Islam by the eighth century. Alongside another ancient Muslim group to their west, the Gebel, who would eventually procreate the Argobba people. Warjih were under the Sultanate of Shewa in the ninth century. The Warjih in the following centuries participated in many battles against Christian Abyssinia. They sided with the Ifat in the Middle Ages, and Adal Sultanate during the Ethiopian-Adal War. It was this time of military conflict that opened the door for the northern expansion of Oromos, and thus began the assimilation of conquered populations, such as the Warjih. Many Warjih people still keep their ethnic identity even after the expansions in their hometown of Daleti in Shewa

== Demographics ==
The Warjih historically populated an area in south-eastern Ethiopia within what is now Oromia Region. In the nineteenth century Warjih occupied the Awash valley and their presence stretched west to the commercial path linked with the Kingdom of Ennarea. Today, they are found primarily in their modern hometown of Daleti and in numerous pastoral communities scattered throughout the regions of Shewa and Wollo. Some have settled in major cities within these former provinces, most prominently in Addis Ababa and Kemise. Due to their longstanding livelihoods as merchants, members of the Warjih community can be found transiently in cities all across Ethiopia

According to the 2007 Ethiopian census carried out by the Central Statistical Agency, the Warjih population numbered 13,232 individuals.

== Language ==
The Warjih today primarily speak Amharic or Oromo as their mother tongue, although this order of primacy may be vice versa depending on where a person lives.

== Politics ==
Prior to the 2010 Ethiopian general election, the current Ethiopian regime approved the creation of the Tigri Worgi Nationality Democratic Organization, which represents a minority of the tribe.

== Notable Warjih ==
- Ali Abdo, former mayor of Addis Ababa

== See also ==
- Wargar, clan once inhabiting Adal
