= Sululta =

Town in Oromia Region, Ethiopia

Sululta Sulultaa
- Town
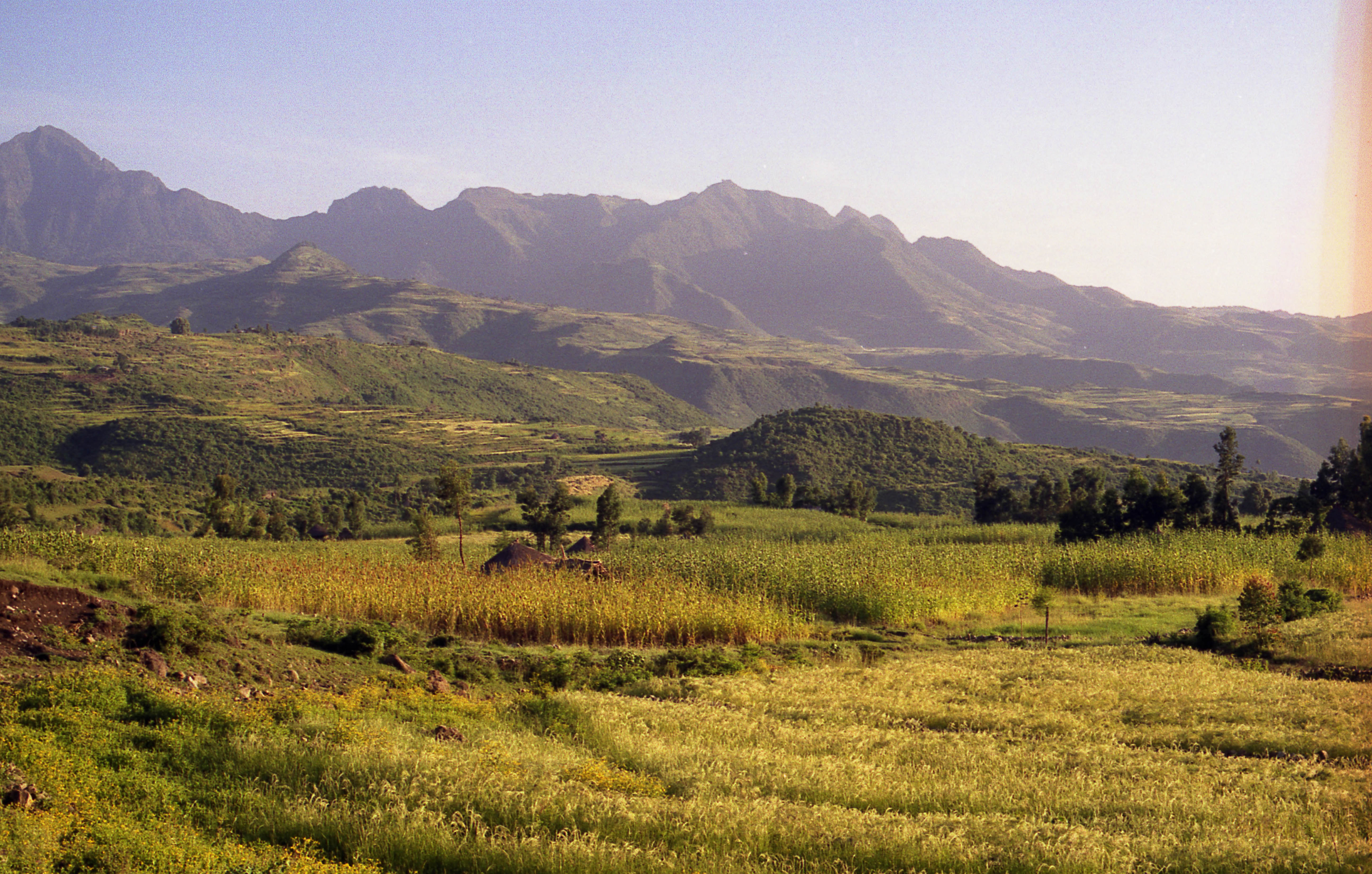
- Sululta plain

- Location within Ethiopia Location within the Horn of Africa Location within Africa
- Coordinates: 9.185278°N 38.760378°E
- Region: Oromia
- Zone: Oromia Special Zone Surrounding Finfinne
- Woreda: Mulo

Area
  - Total: 3,900 km^{2} (1,520 sq mi)
- Elevation: 2,796 m (9,173 ft)

Population (2007)
  - Total: 129,000
  - Density: 47.8/km^{2} (123.7/sq mi)
- Time zone: UTC+3 (EAT)

Sululta (Oromo: Sulultaa) is a town and woreda in Oromia Region, Ethiopia. It was part of former Mulona Sululta woreda which was separated for Mulo and Sululta woredas. Part of the Oromia Special Zone Surrounding Finfinne, Sululta is bordered to the south by the city of Addis Ababa, to the west by the Mulo and West Shewa Zone, to the north by North Shewa Zone, and to the east by Bereh. Towns in Sululta include Chancho, Durba, Muger Sheleko, Rob Gebeya, Sululta and Segno Gebeya.

== Geography ==
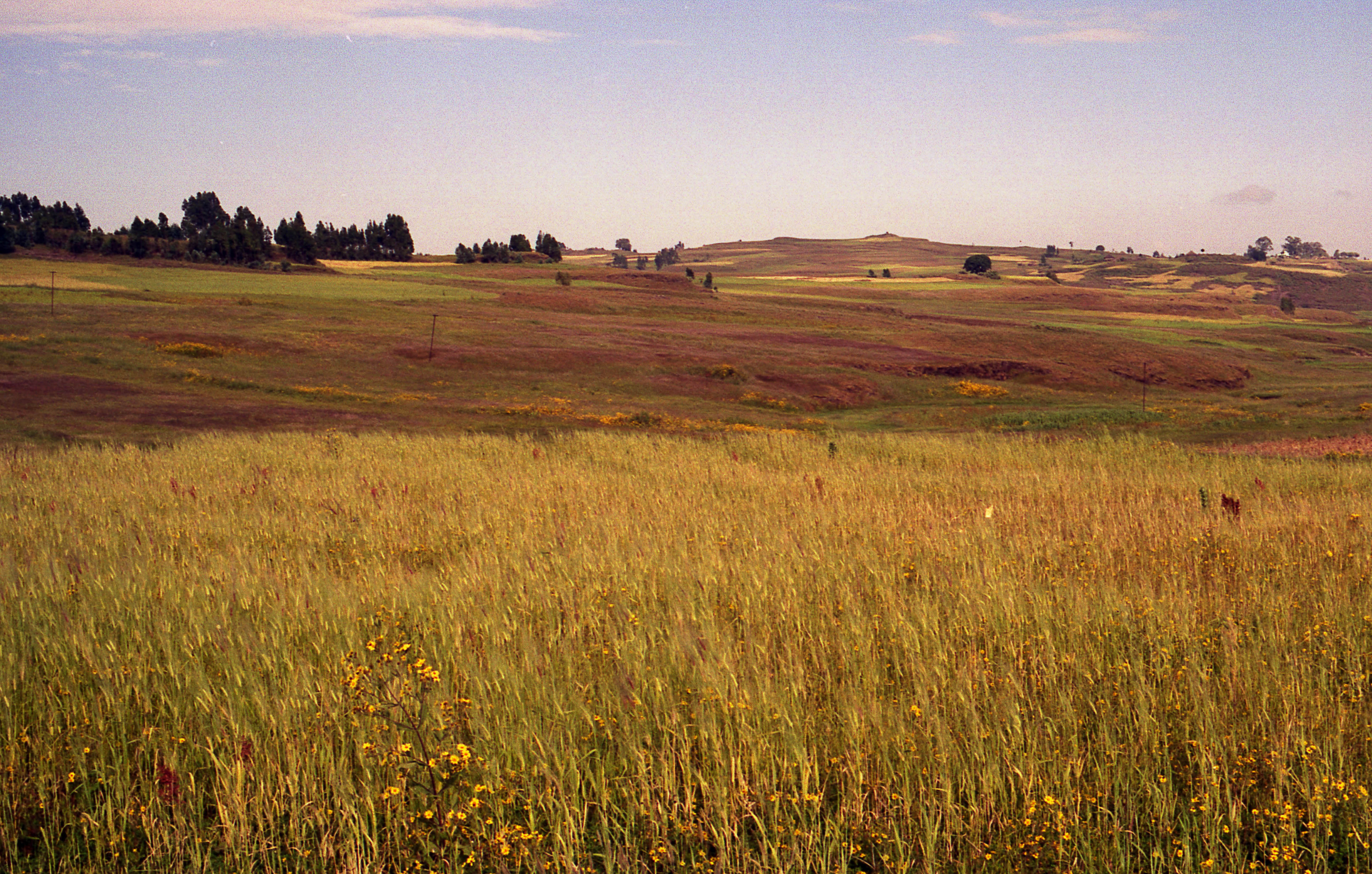
Sululta field in 2000

This woreda is characterized by the Sululta plain, which is a wide, shallow valley with an elevation of 2500 meters above sea level, almost completely surrounded by mountains with numerous small rivers which drain into the Muger. The plain is swampy with some quite large areas of open water in the rainy season, but it reverts to grazing land during the dry months. The surrounding mountainsides were covered with forest dominated by Juniperus procera, and the lower slopes supported groves of Acacia, but now most of the hillsides are covered with plantations of Eucalyptus with only the odd native tree remaining, except for the groves protected by the presence of a church.

== Infrastructure ==
Despite being a popular destination for both foreign and domestic investment, many residents in Sululta still do not have household access to clean drinking water. This has caused mass protests to arise in Sululta in December 2015 and during the 2014–2016 Oromo protests.

== Demographics ==
The 2007 national census reported this woreda's population as 129,000, of whom 64,516 were men and 64,484 women; 15,145 or 11.74% of its population were urban dwellers. The majority of the inhabitants said they practised Ethiopian Orthodox Christianity, with 94.34% of the population reporting they practiced that belief, 2.76% were Protestant, and 2.07% were Muslim.

Based on figures published by the Central Statistical Agency in 2005, Mulona Sululta had an estimated total population of 188,124, of whom 95,156 were men and 92,968 women; 17,748 or 9.43% of its population were urban dwellers, which is about the same as the Zone average of 9.5%. With an estimated area of 1,520.32 square kilometers, Mulona Sululta had an estimated population density of 123.7 people per square kilometer, which is less than the Zone average of 143.

The 1994 national census reported a total population for this woreda of 133,950, of whom 66,523 were men and 67,427 women; 9,944 or 7.42%% of its population were urban dwellers at the time. The two largest ethnic groups reported in Mulona Sululta were the Oromo (93.59%), and the Amhara (5.73%); all other ethnic groups made up 0.22% of the population. Oromo was spoken as a first language by 94.8%, and 4.82% spoke Amharic; the remaining 0.68% spoke all other primary languages reported. The majority of the inhabitants professed Ethiopian Orthodox Christianity, with 98.17% of the population reporting they practiced that belief, while 1.04% of the population said they observed traditional beliefs which was the largest group of this faith in the Zone.

== Attractions ==
- The Kenenisa Camp (Kenenisa Sports Resort), a high-altitude athletics training camp built by Olympian Kenenisa Bekele, is located in Sululta.
