= Sheger City =

2022 proposed urban development model initiated by the Ethiopian government

Sheger City Magaalaa Shaggar ሸገር ከተማ
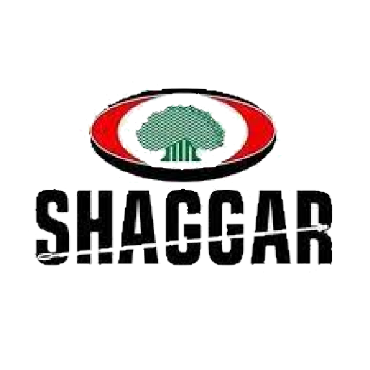
- Location: Addis Ababa and its vicinity Oromia Special Zone surrounding Finfinne
- Status: Under development

Companies
- Owner: Ethiopian government
- Proposed: 22 October 2022

Shaggar City (Amharic: ሸገር ከተማ, Oromo: Magaalaa Shaggar) is established on 22 October 2022 that centers around the city Addis Ababa to provide influence and economic benefit for other satellite cities. The administration contains 12 sub-cities, 36 districts and 40 rural kebeles with its seat located in Saris area in Addis Ababa.

While the plan is intended to expand rapid urbanization, critics argue that such measures may fail to persist. It has been viewed that this plan can cause inequalities in both regional resources and deter overall development. The project was criticized by several media and human rights groups and politicians of violating regional integrity and the constitutional rights of Oromo people, increasing house demolition that belonged to Amhara ethnic group and to justify Oromization.

== Programs ==
The project was announced on 22 October 2022 with consolidating six Oromia towns into outskirt of Addis Ababa. A doughnut-shaped enclave expected to contribute growth of Addis Ababa while it negatively impacts the population density in the boundaries. In December 2022, the Oromia Region organized six cities on Sheger City with its administration office located in Saris area. Teshome Adugna has been the mayor of Sheger City. The new administration has 12 sub-cities, 36 districts and 40 rural kebeles and served as county administration of Ethiopia. According to the Ethiopian Reporter local news reporter Gugsa Dejene, the administration caused regional disparity while contributing development on infrastructure and economic and social affairs.

== Controversy ==
The Shaggar City master plan is a source of controversy due to the Oromia government scheme to enclave Addis Ababa that raises government mass house demolition of civilians, mostly belonged to non-Oromo groups. It has been feared that the lack transparency can create corruption regarding allocation of land and Amharas are systematically displaced by the demolition. The victimization of Amhara would escalate armed mobilization.

Leaders of the Oromo Federalist Congress (OFC) criticized the plan due to violating constitutional and the rights of Oromo people. According to the Ethiopian Human Rights Commission (EHRC) report in March 2023, the house demolition in Sheger City is illegal and against the humans rights and international law.

== See also ==
- House demolition in Ethiopia under Abiy Ahmed rule
- Oromia–Addis Ababa relations
