= Daniel Tesfaye =

Ethiopian cyclist

Personal information
- Full name: Daniel Tesfaye

Cycling career
- Sport: Cycling

Daniel Tesfaye is an Ethiopian former cyclist. He competed in the team time trial at the 1992 Summer Olympics.
