= Addis Alem (town) =

Town in central Ethiopia

Addis Alem Ejjeree (Oromo)
- Town
- Location within Ethiopia
- Coordinates: 9°2′N 38°24′E
- Country: Ethiopia
- Region: (Oromia Region) Oromia
- Zone: West Shewa
- Woreda: Ejerie
- Elevation: 2,360 m (7,740 ft)

Population (2005)
  - Total: 13,423
- Time zone: UTC+3 (EAT)
- Area code: 11
- Climate: Cwb

Addis Alem (Amharic: አዲስ ዓለም, New World; also known as Ejerie) is a town in central Ethiopia. Located in the West Shewa Zone of the Oromia Region, west of Addis Ababa, this town has a latitude and longitude of 9°2′N 38°24′E with an elevation of about 2360 meters above sea level.

Based on figures from the Central Statistical Agency in 2005, this town has an estimated total population of 13,423 of whom 6,420 were males and 7,003 were females. The 1994 census reported this town had a total population of 7,516 of whom 3,482 were males and 4,034 were females. It is the largest settlement in Ejerie Aanaa.

Ejerie is known for the Basilica Church of St Maryam. Its adjacent museum burned to the ground in 1997; however a new one has since opened.

== History ==
Ejerie was founded in 1900 by Menelik II as a new capital city; Empress Taytu Betul picked the name. Although at one point he had 20,000 members of the Welega Oromo busy in constructing buildings in the new city, by 1903 he decided to keep the capital at Addis Ababa. However, it was used by the Emperor as his summer palace during the following years. The first paved road in Ethiopia was constructed between Ejerie and the capital, the work beginning in 1903, and reported in quite usable condition the next year.

Around 1930, most of the wood for the buildings and furniture in Addis Ababa was sawn from the forests near Addis Alem. During the Italian occupation, a factory for the production of slaked lime was established during the Italian time, and in its first year of production it turned out 30,000 hundredweights of the material. On 2 December 1940 the Arbegnoch, led by Admiqe Besha, attacked the Italian garrison. The Italians lost 72 men, and 2,007 rifles, cannons and hand grenades. On 3 April in the following year, the Italians sent a cavalry regiment 450 strong to recapture Ejerie; There it was defeated by the Arbegnoch superior numbers, leaving 42 men on the ground and 30 other injured including the regiment commander Vittorio Casardi.

A number of notable artists are associated with this town. The church has some art work by Abebe Wolde Giorgis (1897–1967), who studied in France for 18 years, has contributed to the art work of the church of St. Maryam. Worku Mammo Dessalegn, born in Addis Alem in 1935, lost both hands in an accident while playing with a bomb at the age of twelve; he attended the Art School in 1960–1962, later studied in the USSR and then returned to the Art School in Addis Ababa as a teacher. A third is Tadesse Bedaso Begna, born in Ejerie in 1943, who attended a Baptist school, graduated from the Art School in 1966 and then studied graphic arts in London; he has designed stamps, posters and insignia.
