= Inter-Religious Council of Ethiopia =

Interfaith organization in Ethiopia

- የኢትዮጵያ የሃይማኖት ተቋማት ጉባኤ
- Formation: 2010; 16 years ago
- Type: Interfaith organizations
- Purpose: Maintaining religious freedom, harmony and welfare
- Headquarters: Ras Desta Damtew St, Addis Ababa, Ethiopia
- Region served: Ethiopia
- Secretary General: Liqe Tiguhan Tagay Tadele
- Website: www.ircethiopia.et

The Inter-Religious Council of Ethiopia (Amharic: የኢትዮጵያ የሃይማኖት ተቋማት ጉባኤ; IRCE) is an interfaith organization that promotes peace, security and harmony of all major religions in Ethiopia. Verified by the Ministry of Federal Affairs, it was established in 2010 and expanded its mission through federal, regional and district levels. The interfaith council planned to develop advocacy workshops and implements various projects. Its vision is stated to "develop religious freedom and equality based on peace, love and tolerance, which will be mutually beneficial to all."

== Overview ==
The council has one national and two regional consultative and experienced workshops which involved 870 religious leaders and faith-based organization on the issues of religious harmony and plurality. Each adherents of religion has the right to establish educational institution, publishing and distributing books, newspapers and magazines. The Council addresses issues on women and children welfare, maternal and youth reproductive health, HIV/AIDS and harmful traditional practices.

The council also has the right to participate decision-making in political activities in accordance with the constitutional separation of state and religion.

== List of members ==
The Council membership includes seven major denominations:

- Ethiopian Orthodox Tewahedo Church
- Ethiopian Islamic Affairs Supreme Council
- Ethiopian Catholic Church
- Evangelical Churches Fellowship of Ethiopia
- Seventh Day Adventist Church
- Ethiopian Evangelical Church
- Mekane Yesus
- Ethiopian Kale Heywet Church

== See also ==
- Religion in Ethiopia
