= Galan, Ethiopia =

Town in Oromia Region, Ethiopia

Galan Galaan
- Town
- Location within Ethiopia Galan (Africa)
- Coordinates: 8°49′36.21″N 38°51′33.59″E
- Country: Ethiopia
- Region: Oromia
- Zone: Oromia Special Zone Surrounding Finfinne
- Time zone: UTC+3 (EAT)

Galan (Oromo: Galaan) is a town located in the Akaki district of the Oromia Special Zone Surrounding Finfine and 25 km South East from Addis Ababa Addis Ababa-Adama highway crossing galan town.

In 2020 it attracted attention for being the site of the murder of Oromo musician Hachalu Hundessa, whose death sparked a series of intense rioting across Oromia.

== See also ==
- Districts in the Oromia Region
