= Sebeta Hawas (town) =

Town in Oromia Region, Ethiopia

Sebeta Hawas Sabbataa Hawaas (Oromo)
- Sub City
- Location within Ethiopia
- Coordinates: 8°55′N 38°39′E
- Country: Ethiopia
- Region: Oromia
- Zone: Oromia Special Zone Surrounding Finfinne
- Woreda: Sebeta Hawas
- Elevation: 2,369 m (7,772 ft)

Population (2005)
  - Total: 8,317
- Time zone: UTC+3 (EAT)

Sebeta Hawas (Oromo: Sabbataa Hawaas) also known as Alem Gena is a town in central Oromia Region, Ethiopia. It is located in the Oromia Special Zone Surrounding Finfinne. It is at an elevation of 2369 meters above sea level. Sebeta Hawas is one of four towns in Sebeta Hawas district.

== Overview ==
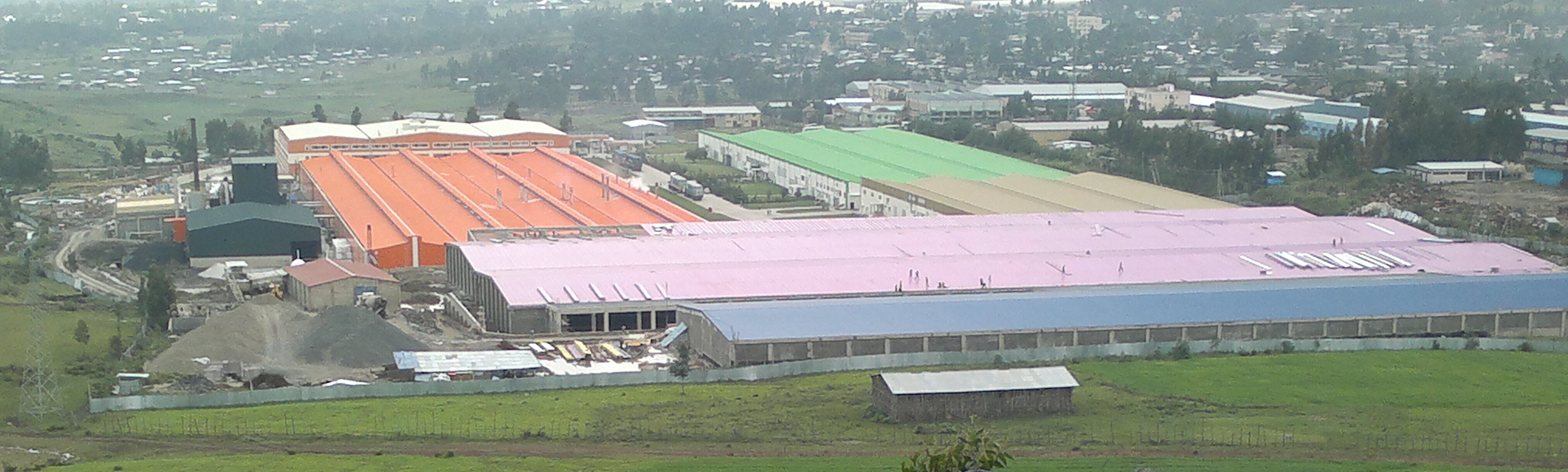
Factory buildings of Ayka Textile Industry in Sebeta Hawas.

Records at the Nordic Africa Institute website state that there is an equipment yard for the Ethiopian Highway Authority in Sebeta Hawas. One of the largest Turkish textile factories, AYKA Textile Industry and Trade Incorporated, began relocating its garment factory to Sebeta Hawas in December 2006. The Turkish manufacturer established earlier that year an Ethiopian subsidiary, AYKA Addis Plc, to run the factory. This factory, built at a cost of US$140 million, is inaugurated by Prime Minister Meles Zenawi on 30 April 2010.

== Demographics ==
Based on figures from the Central Statistical Agency in 2005, Sebeta Hawas has an estimated total population of 8,317, of whom 4,051 are men and 4,266 are women. The 1994 national census reported this town had a total population of 4,654 of whom 2,197 were men and 2,457 were women.
