= Ethiopian Institution of the Ombudsman =

Ombudsman organization of Ethiopia

- የኢትዮጵያ ሕዝብ ዕንባ ጠባቂ ተቋም
- Abbreviation: EIO
- Formation: 1999
- Type: Nonprofit
- Registration no.: ET-COA-134
- Purpose: Ombudsman
- Headquarters: Churchill Ave, Addis Ababa, Ethiopia
- Chief: Endale Haile
- Website: ethombudsman.gov.et

The Ethiopian Institution of the Ombudsman (Amharic: የኢትዮጵያ ሕዝብ ዕንባ ጠባቂ ተቋም; EIO) is the ombudsman of the Federal Democratic Republic of Ethiopia, established in 1999 by the Constitution Article 55 Sub-Article 1 and 15 in Decree No 211/1999. The institution is accountable to the House of Peoples' Representatives (HoPR).

== Background ==
The Ethiopian Institution of the Ombudsman (EIO) was established in 1999 by FDRE Constitution Article 55 Sub-Article 1 and 15 in Decree No 211/1999. It is accountable to the House of Peoples' Representatives (HoPR). Due to shortage of manpower, budget and resources, the institution did not begin its operation immediately after establishment until 2004. As ombudsman, it complies the rights and interests of people stipulated by law are respected by the executive bodies, and bringing good governance with "quality, efficiency and transparency" accorded by the rule of law.

In addition, EIO functions as oversight of regulations, administrative directives, and decisions issued by executive organs and ensuring constitutional rights and legal frameworks. EIO headquartered in Addis Ababa and expanded its branches in Bahir Dar, Oromia, Assosa, Semera, Hawassa, Dire Dawa, Gambela and Mekelle. Since June 2018, Endale Haile has been the Chief of EIO.
