= Oromia Special Zone surrounding Finfinne =

Zone in Oromia Region of Ethiopia

Oromia Special Zone surrounding Finfinne Godina Addaa Naannaa Finfinnee (Oromo)
- Zone
- Country: Ethiopia
- Region: Oromia
- Capital: Addis Ababa (Note: Finfinne is the Oromo name of the city, and promoted as an official name of the city by the regional state authorities of Oromia.)

Map of the regions and zones of Ethiopia

The Oromia Special Zone surrounding Finfinne (Oromo: Godina Addaa naannawa Finfinnee) is a zone in Oromia Region of Ethiopia that surrounds Addis Ababa (also known as Finfine: literally "natural spring", in the Oromo language). It was created in 2008 from parts of North Shewa Zone, East Shewa Zone, Southwest Shewa zone and West Shewa Zones. The zone was created to support the cooperation and development of the surrounding areas of Addis Ababa, and to control the urban sprawl of the city on the lands of Oromia. The administrative center of this zone is in Addis Ababa (Finfinne). The districts and town in this zone include Akaki, Bereh, Burayu, Dubra, Holeta Town, Koye Feche, Mulo, Sebeta Hawas, Sebeta Town, Sendafa Town, Sululta, Walmara, Laga Xafo Laga Dadhi, Galan, Sebeta Hawas (Town) and Dukem.

== Demographics ==
As the special zone was created after the census of 2007, it is hard to find correct data about its population. The estimated population size according to the 2007 census conducted by the CSA is 794,489, of which 228,420 or 28.75% were urban dwellers.

== See also ==
- Sheger City
