= Ethiopian News Agency =

Official news agency of the government of Ethiopia

- Formation: 1942
- Headquarters: Addis Ababa, Ethiopia
- Official languages: Amharic, Arabic and Oromo
- Website: ena.et

The Ethiopian News Agency (Amharic: የኢትዮጵያ ዜና አገልግሎት Ye-Ityopya Zéna Agelgelot (IZA) or ENA) is the official news agency of the government of Ethiopia. It is the oldest news organisation in Ethiopia.

== History ==
The ENA's inception dates back to 1942, when a news distribution service was opened as part of the Press Department, which was within the Press and Information Bureau. In 1943, the service was renamed Agence Direction, and assigned to the Ministry of Pen (Tsehafi Tae'zaz in Amharic). It can be argued that it was the first national wire service in Africa, as no other African country had an indigenous service of the kind, due to colonialism, wherein social, political and economic institutions were established by, and made to serve, the interests of the colonial powers. Agence Direction closed in 1947 due to budget constraints in the Ministry of Pen.

== Twentieth century ==
In 1954, Emperor Haile Selassie was embarking on a world tour and Agence Direction reopened so that Ethiopia could receive news of the tour. There was no further significant development in the next 10 years, except for a few attempts at expanding the service locally.

Beginning in late 1963, Agence Direction began to make its presence felt among the public through newspapers and radio broadcasting. Its name was changed to Ethiopian News Source in 1964, then to its present name of Ethiopian News Agency in 1967.

In 1995, it became a semi-autonomous agency under a board that is accountable to the House of Peoples' Representatives. Its autonomy is very limited, with the government having full control.

== Twenty-first century ==
It has about three dozen branches across Ethiopia.

In October 2022, the Russian state news agency Sputnik and ENA announced a deal to exchange content. On behalf of ENA, Yohannes Wondirad stated that international news would be exchanged between the agencies subject to "the local laws and legislations applicable to both countries".
