= Ethiopian Institute of Agricultural Research =

Ethiopian public research institute

The Ethiopian Institute of Agricultural Research (EIAR) is a research institute for agricultural study in Ethiopia. has evolved through several stages since its initiation during the late 1940s, following the establishment of the agricultural and technical school of Ambo and Jimma. Until the mid-1960s the Imperial College of Agricultural and Mechanical Arts—now Haramaya University—with its Agricultural Experiment Station at Bishoftu—now Debre-Zeit Agricultural Research Center (DZARC)—was the major research entity. The establishment of the then Institute of Agricultural Research (IAR) in 1966 saw the first nationally coordinated agricultural research system in Ethiopia.

The EIAR is a Federal Agricultural Research Institute. EIAR is responsible for the running of federal research centers, and regional research institutes are administered by the regional governments. In addition to conducting research at its federal centers, EIAR is charged with the responsibility for providing the overall coordination of agricultural research countrywide, and advising Government on agricultural research policy formulation.

Currently, the EIAR comprises 20 research centers and sites located across various agro-ecological zones. The research centers have a mandate to coordinate different national commodities. Some of the research centers and sites have one or more sub-centers and testing sites, for example, the Essential Oils Research Center (EORC).

== Core mandates ==
- Supply of improved agricultural technology,
- Popularization of improved technologies,
- Coordination of the national agricultural research, and
- Capacity building of farmers, development agents, agricultural extension officers, prototype manufacturers, researchers and other technology users.
