= Laga Xafo Laga Dadhi =

City in Oromia Region, Ethiopia

Laga Tafo Laga Dadhi Laga Xaafoo Laga Daadhii (Oromo)
- City
- Location within Ethiopia Laga Tafo Laga Dadhi (Africa)
- Coordinates: 9°3′57.26″N 38°53′16.32″E
- Country: Ethiopia
- Region: Oromia
- Zone: Oromia Special Zone Surrounding Finfinne
- Time zone: UTC+3 (EAT)

Laga Xafo Laga Dadhi (Oromo: laga Xaafoo Laga Daadhii) is a city adjacent to Addis Ababa located in the Oromia Special Zone Surrounding Finfinne. It was created in 2008 from North Shewa Zone (Oromia)

== Administrative changes ==
In 2022, Laga Tafo (also spelled Laga Dadi) was merged with neighboring towns, including Burayu, Sebeta, Sululta, and Galan, to form Shaggar City, an administrative city in the Oromia Region.

== See also ==
- Districts in the Oromia Region
