= Sabata (town) =

Town in Oromia Region, Ethiopia

- Town
- Location within Ethiopia Sabata (Africa)
- Coordinates: 8°54′40″N 38°37′17″E
- Country: Ethiopia
- Region: Oromia
- Zone: Oromia Special Zone Surrounding Finfinne
- Elevation: 2,356 m (7,730 ft)

Population (2007)
  - Total: 49,331
- Time zone: UTC+3 (EAT)
- Climate: Cwb

Sabata (Oromo: Sabbataa) is a town in the Oromia Special Zone Surrounding Addis Ababa of the Oromia Region in Ethiopia.

The Sabataa School for the Blind is located in Sabata. It became part of the Haile Selassie I Foundation in 1959, and construction on a new building began on 4 October 1962. The Ethiopian Institute of Agricultural Research opened a research station in Sabata in 1967, which operates as the national center for research into improving fishing yields.

== History ==
A plot to kill the Emperor near Sabata with a land mine in the road was discovered on 16 November 1969. Eight people were arrested, and the leader, 76-year-old Tekle Wolde Hawariat, killed himself next day after a gun battle with police at his home in Addis Ababa. He was mentioned without dishonor in the Ethiopian media because of his valuable service to the country in previous years.

A congregation of the Mekane Yesus Church was established in 1979. The congregation's church was burnt by a mob in April 1994, and the leaders of the Ethiopian Orthodox Church afterwards failed to condemn the act.

== Demographics ==
The 2007 national census reported a total population for Sabata of 49,331, of whom 24,356 were men and 24,975 were women. The majority of the inhabitants said they practised Ethiopian Orthodox Christianity, with 71.1% of the population reporting they observed this belief, while 16.87% of the population were Muslim, and 11.18% were Protestant.

According to the 1994 national census, the town had a population of 14,100.
