= Meta Robi =

District in Ethiopia

Coordinates: 9°20′N 38°10′E

Meta Robi is one of the Aanaas in the Oromiya region of Ethiopia. Part of the West Shaggar (Shoa Zone), it is bordered on the south by Ejere, on the southwest by Jeldu, on the northwest by Ginda Beret, on the north by the Muger River (which separates it from the North Shaggar (Shoa Zone)), and on the east by Ada'a Berga. The major town in Meta Robi is Shino.

The missionary Johann Ludwig Krapf passed through the district of a tribe of the Oromo, who were called the Meta Robi, named in part after a local river, the Robi on 27 January 1840. The river was in Shoa, southwest of Ankober.

== Demographics ==
The 2007 national census reported a total population for this woreda of 140,627, of whom 69,664 were men and 70,963 women; 4,027 or 2.86% of its population were urban dwellers. The majority of the inhabitants said they practised Ethiopian Orthodox Christianity, with 62.35% of the population reporting they observed this belief, while 27.49% of the population were Protestant, and 9.76% practiced traditional beliefs.

Based on figures published by the Central Statistical Agency in 2005, this woreda has an estimated total population of 144,103, of whom 73,070 are men and 71,033 women; 2,683 or 1.86% of its population are urban dwellers, which is less than the Zone average of 12.3%. With an estimated area of 972.51 square kilometers, Meta Robi has an estimated population density of 148.2 people per square kilometer, which is less than the Zone average of 152.8.

The 1994 national census reported a total population for this woreda of 104,427, of whom 51,786 were men and 52,641 women; 1,502 or 1.44% of its population were urban dwellers at the time. The two largest ethnic groups reported in Meta Robi were the Oromo (97.61%), and the Amhara (2.33%); all other ethnic groups made up 0.06% of the population. The Oromo language was spoken as a first language by 99.15% The majority of the inhabitants professed Ethiopian Orthodox Christianity, with 90.67% of the population reporting they practiced that belief, while 4.98% of the population said they practiced Waaqeffanna, and 4.29% were Protestant.
