= Grand Anwar Mosque =

Largest mosque in Addis Ababa, Ethiopia

- ታላቁ የአንዋር መስጊድ; مسجد الأنوار الكبير
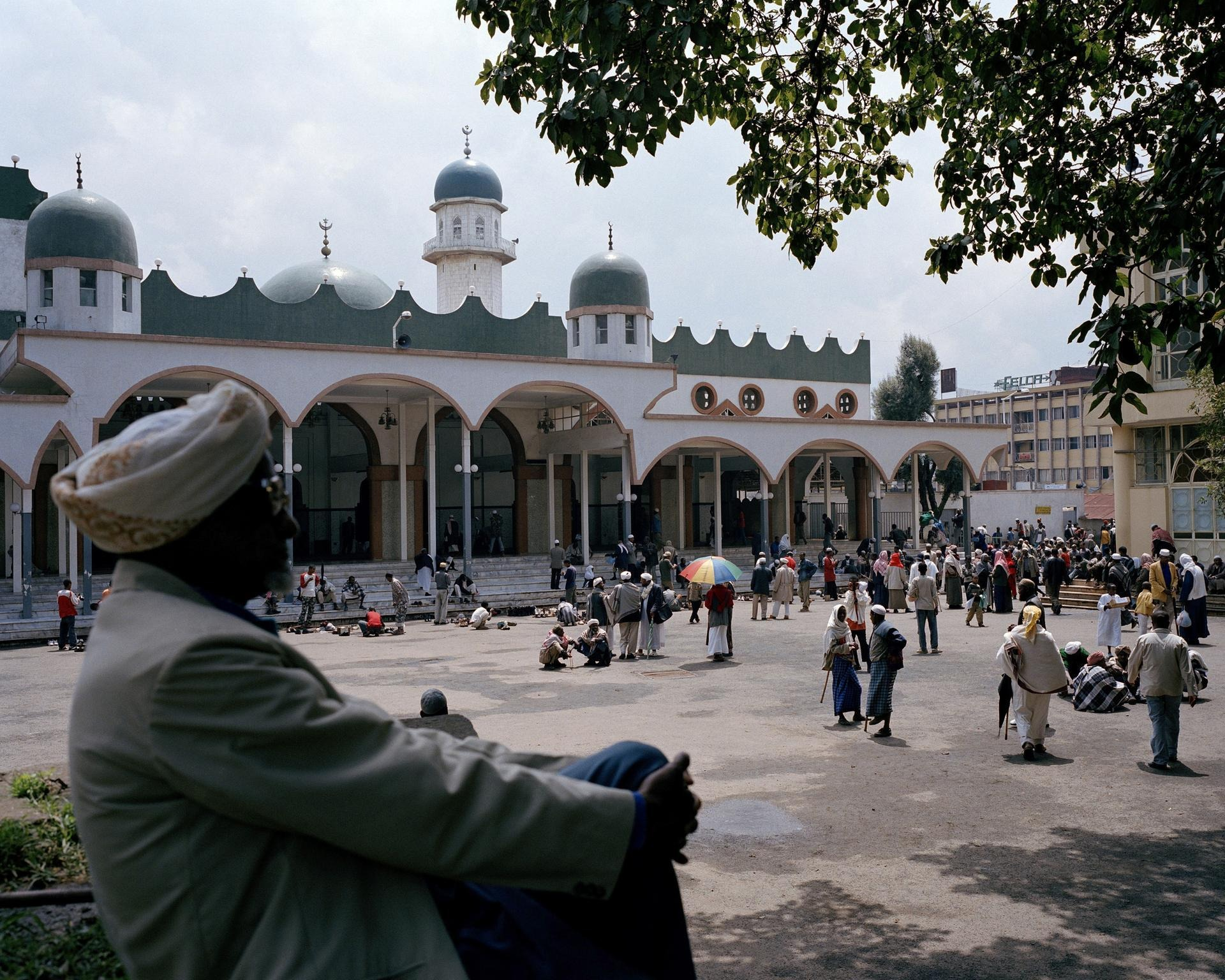
- Anwar Mosque in 2024

- Location of the mosque in Ethiopia

Religion
- Affiliation: Islam
- Ecclesiastical or organizational status: Mosque
- Status: Active

Location
- Location: Kenya Street, Merkato, Arada, Addis Ababa
- Country: Ethiopia
- Interactive map of Grand Anwar Mosque
- Coordinates: 9°02′00″N 38°44′28″E

Architecture
- Type: Mosque
- Style: Islamic
- Completed: c. 1922
- Dome: 2 (maybe more)

The Grand Anwar Mosque (Arabic: مسجد الأنوار الكبير, romanized: Jama'a Salat, lit. 'Place where people pray', Amharic: ታላቁ የአንዋር መስጊድ), also called Al-Anwar Mosque or simply Anwar Mosque, is a mosque located in the Merkato or marketplace of Arada district in Addis Ababa, Ethiopia. It is the largest and oldest mosque in Addis Ababa. It was built by Italians in c. 1922 and finished with assistance of Muslim funds after 16,000 birr remained unpaid to the contractor.

== Overview ==
The Grand Anwar Mosque is located in Merkato, in Arada district of Addis Ababa. It was built by the Italian government in c. 1922. The mosque is the largest and one of the oldest mosques in Addis Ababa. The mosque has unique architecture with white and green colors.

After the Italians left unfinished, Muslims collected money to resume the construction. When the construction completed, 16,000 ETB were not paid to the contractor, which led to closure for couple of days by court order. The mosque then reopened as an individual covered payment.

During fasting periods, thousands of people gather in the mosque compound and man can carry incense to smell inside the mosque. A portable podium placed to the middle of green pillars supporting the white outer walls and domes that form spectacular façade of the mosque.

== Notable incidents ==
On 21 February 1995, violent clash erupted between the police and supporters of the then second vice-chairman of the Ethiopian Supreme Council for Islamic Affairs, leading to the arrest of 40 members of the Muslim elite and 9 people's deaths. The incident produced shock among Muslim residents and a number of Islamic periodicals were ceased for publication since 1991. Between late 1995 and early 1996, there were eight tabloids published in Amharic that contains religious and secular subjects and relevant ideas connected to Islam. The distribution of these papers has been contentious among Islam community which believed the press publication in Amharic could shape the Muslim culture.

On 11 December 2015, a grenade attack occurred during evening prayers which left ten people wounded according to the government. Information Minister Getachew Reda said the attack was under investigation and authorities remained unsure.

== See also ==
- Islam in Ethiopia
- List of mosques in Ethiopia
