= West Shewa Zone =

Zone in Oromia Region of Ethiopia

Coordinates: 9°10′N 37°50′E

Map of the regions and zones of Ethiopia

West Shewa Zone (Oromo: Shawaa Lixaa/Dhihaa) is a zone in Oromia Region of Ethiopia. This zone takes its name from the kingdom or former province of Shewa. West Shewa is bordered on the south by the Southwest Shewa Zone and the Southern Nations, Nationalities and Peoples Region, on the southwest by Jimma, on the west by East Welega Zone, on the northwest by Horo Gudru Welega Zone, on the north by the Amhara Region, on the northeast by North Shewa, and on the east by Oromia Special Zone Surrounding Addis Abeba. Its highest point is Mount Wenchi (3386 meters); other notable peaks include Mount Mengesha and Mount Wechacha. Towns and cities in West Shewa include Ambo.

Between 2002 and 2005, a number of districts were separated from West Shewa to create South West Shewa Zone.

== Demographics ==
Based on the 2007 Census conducted by the Central Statistical Agency of Ethiopia (CSA), this Zone has a total population of 2,058,676, of whom 1,028,501 are men and 1,030,175 women; with an area of 14,788.78 square kilometers, West Shewa has a population density of 139.21. While 242,352 or 6.10% are urban inhabitants, a further 53 individuals are pastoralists. A total of 428,689 households were counted in this Zone, which results in an average of 4.80 persons to a household, and 415,013 housing units. The two largest ethnic groups reported in West Shewa were the Oromo (93.82%) and the Amhara (5.15%); all other ethnic groups made up 1.03% of the population. Oromo was spoken as a first language by 93.99% and 5.47% spoke Amharic; the remaining 0.54% spoke all other primary languages reported. The majority of the inhabitants professed Ethiopian Orthodox Christianity, with 53.84% of the population having reported they practiced that belief, while 32.93% of the population professed Protestantism, 2.73% of the population were Muslim and 9.85% said they held traditional beliefs.

The 1994 national census reported a total population for this Zone of 2,329,699 in 480,735 households, of whom 1,153,185 were men and 1,176,514; 225,993 or 9.7% of its population were urban dwellers at the time. The three largest ethnic groups reported in West Shewa were the Oromo (89.78%), the Amhara (6.66%), and the Gurage (1.73%); all other ethnic groups made up 1.83% of the population. Oromo was spoken as a first language by 89.47%, 7.32% Amharic, and 1.16% spoke Sebat Bet Gurage; the remaining 2.05% spoke all other primary languages reported. The majority of the inhabitants professed Ethiopian Orthodox Christianity, with 80.6% of the population having reported they practice that belief, while 7% of the population said they held traditional beliefs, 6.58% were Protestant, and 5.34% were Muslim.

According to a May 24, 2004 World Bank memorandum, 35% of the inhabitants of West Shewa have access to electricity, this zone has a road density of 29.2 kilometers per 1000 square kilometers (compared to the national average of 30 kilometers), the average rural household has 1.4 hectare of land (compared to the national average of 1.01 hectare of land and an average of 1.14 for the Oromia Region) and the equivalent of 0.7 heads of livestock. 31.8% of the population is in non-farm related jobs, compared to the national average of 25% and a Regional average of 24%. Concerning education, 66% of all eligible children are enrolled in primary school, and 28% in secondary schools. Concerning health, 89% of the zone is exposed to malaria, and none to Tsetse fly. The memorandum gave this zone a drought risk rating of 406.
