= Traditional education in Ethiopia =

Educational system of Ethiopia from 330 AD to 1908

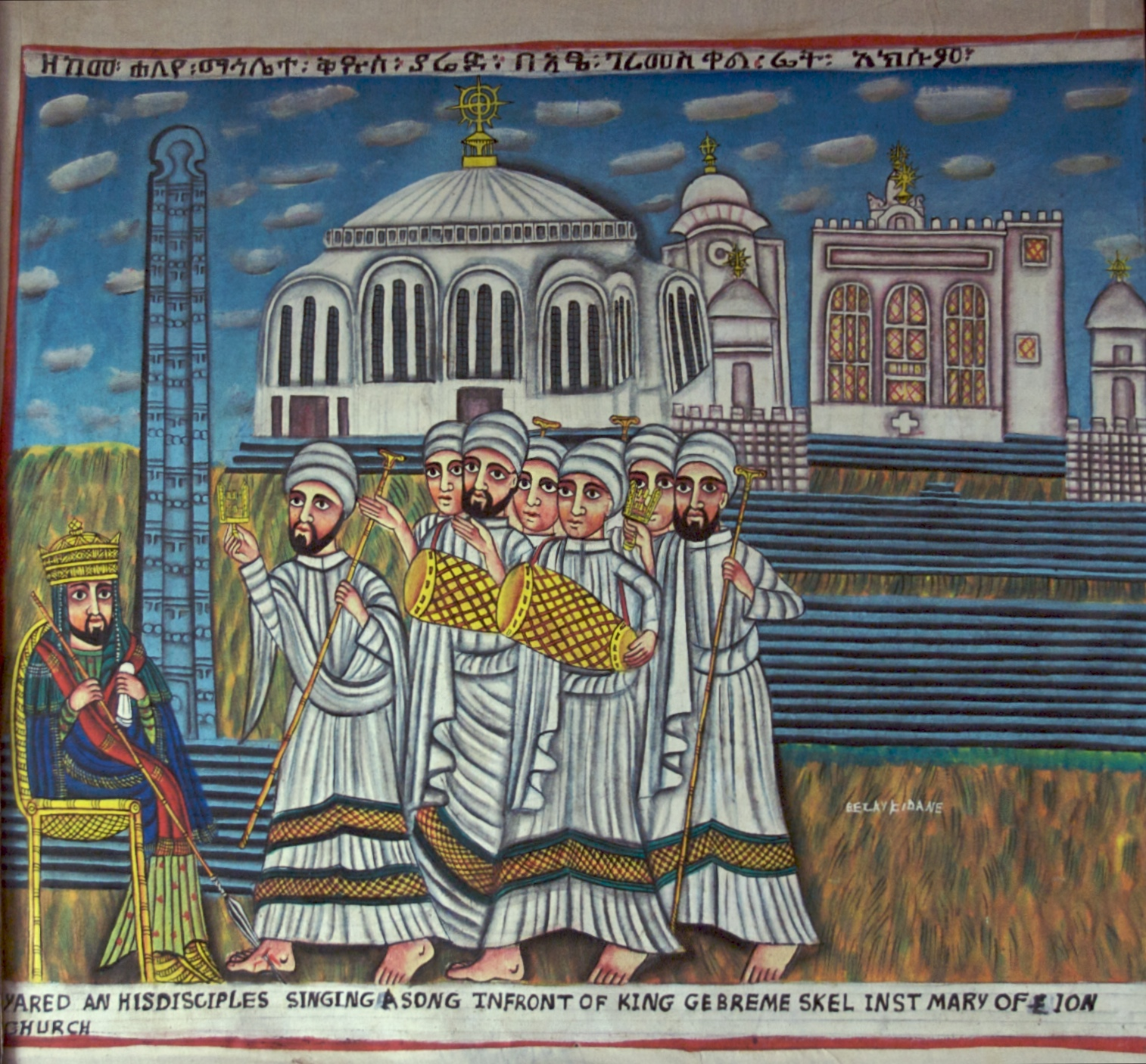
Modern painting of Saint Yared with his disciples singing to Axumite emperor Gebre Meskel in Remhai Hotel, Axum

The Ethiopian traditional educational system traced back to Axumite period in 330 AD as Christianity first accepted in the region. The education was highly emphasized Christian dogma, consisted up to higher education, the monastery. Students graduated from every monasteries earn ranks of priesthood and upon reaching the final stage, the Negus, they acquire an intellectual elite, known as debtera.

Debteras are ordained clergymen specialized ecclesiastical and secular knowledge and considered literate people among ruling class of feudal monarchy. Some debteras suspected to have an occult knowledge, such as witchcrafts, and exorcism by laity. In line with Orthodox institution, Islamic and other indigenous education also influenced Ethiopia and by the mid-19th century, Protestant and Catholic missionaries opened the first modernized theological education and influenced some people to convert.

Formally, traditional education faded away since the start of European-styled schools opened in the early 20th century and assistance by Emperor Menelik II. It was speculated that the first modern curriculum was designated as Menelik opened his school in 1908.

== Roles of Orthodox teachings ==
The Ethiopian Orthodox Tewahedo Church has crucial role to disseminate traditional ancient educational system of Ethiopia to read Old and New Testaments in Ge'ez since Axumite period in 330 AD. The teaching highly emphasized Christian and Islamic dogma; Christian education at primary level often conducted by clergy in place of worship and major monasteries located northern and northwestern part of the country. Graduation from these centers leads to earn priesthood and church hierarchy.

Undergraduated students furtherly became debteras, a traditional intellectual elite. The nature of education relies on liturgical texts made themselves principal masters in the church. In order to hold religious singers, dancers and choristers, they were invaluable sources and interpreters of ecclesiastical knowledge and doctrine. The "intellectual elite" however pervaded with orthodox belief laying outside the church and not requisite to courts of the feudal kings, nobles, and barons.

=== Curricula ===
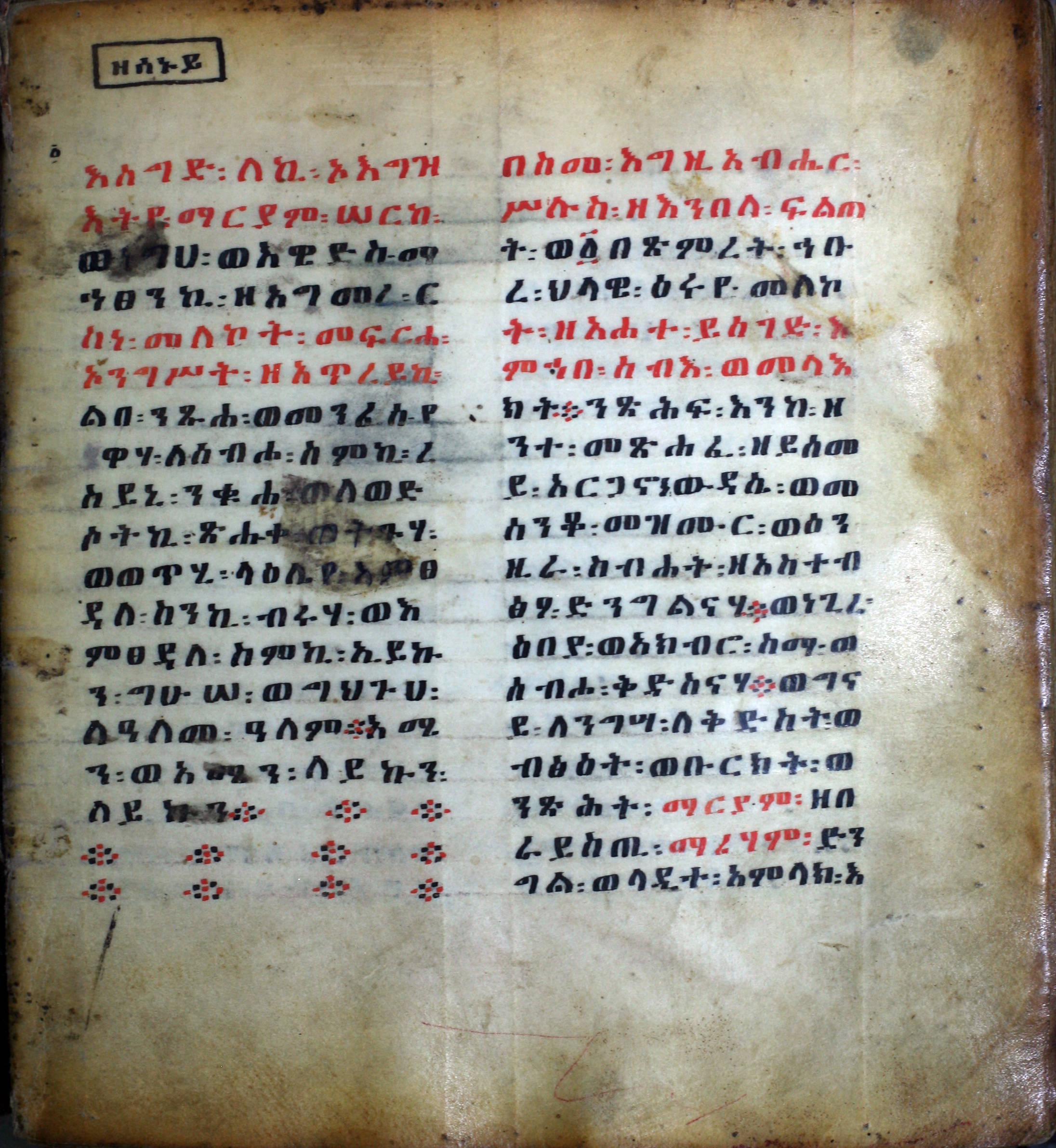
Ge'ez script from 15th century prayer book

The primary level had five stages. The first level consisted of Fidel mastery with 231 Ethiopic letters while the second stage was consisted of Fidel-Hawaria ("the apostle's syllabary"), by studying the first epistle general of Saint John in Ge'ez. Hence, writing and numerical studies began and teachers often taught themselves in their own will.

The third stage was memorizing Gebeta-Hawaria from sections in the New Testament and the Apostles' Creed, which was read by pupils in unison, emphasized the pronunciation and intonation. Tselote-Hawaria studied orally at this stage and writing and numerical studies could continue depending on increasing instruction and pupils wishes. Religious songs therefore started and students would serve choristers.

The fourth stage known as Dawit (Psalms of David), consisting of reading Psalms in Ge'ez pronunciation where instructor supervising pupils carefully. Lessons divided into 15 parts, named after Negus (king), where "Negus" also the first word or phrase of each section. Procession to one Negus to another was highly recommended. Upon reaching the 15th Negus, the student graduated from primary level and parents and teachers bestowed gifts to the pupil. In this parlance, Negus means socialization towards political authority. Under the last stage in elementary school, the role to be deacon was basic rule for church leaders and transition to higher education and serving as debtera or full-time priest. At this time, grasping the whole Psalms of David into memory with proper pronunciation and intonation is needed, and other prayers such as Wudasse Amlak (Praises to God), Arganon (Praises to the Virgin Mary) are arranged for each day of the week; Songs of Solomon, Songs of the Prophets, elementary Kidase (rudiments of general liturgy) and Sa'atat (hours of night service) should be memorized in mind.

=== Higher education stage ===
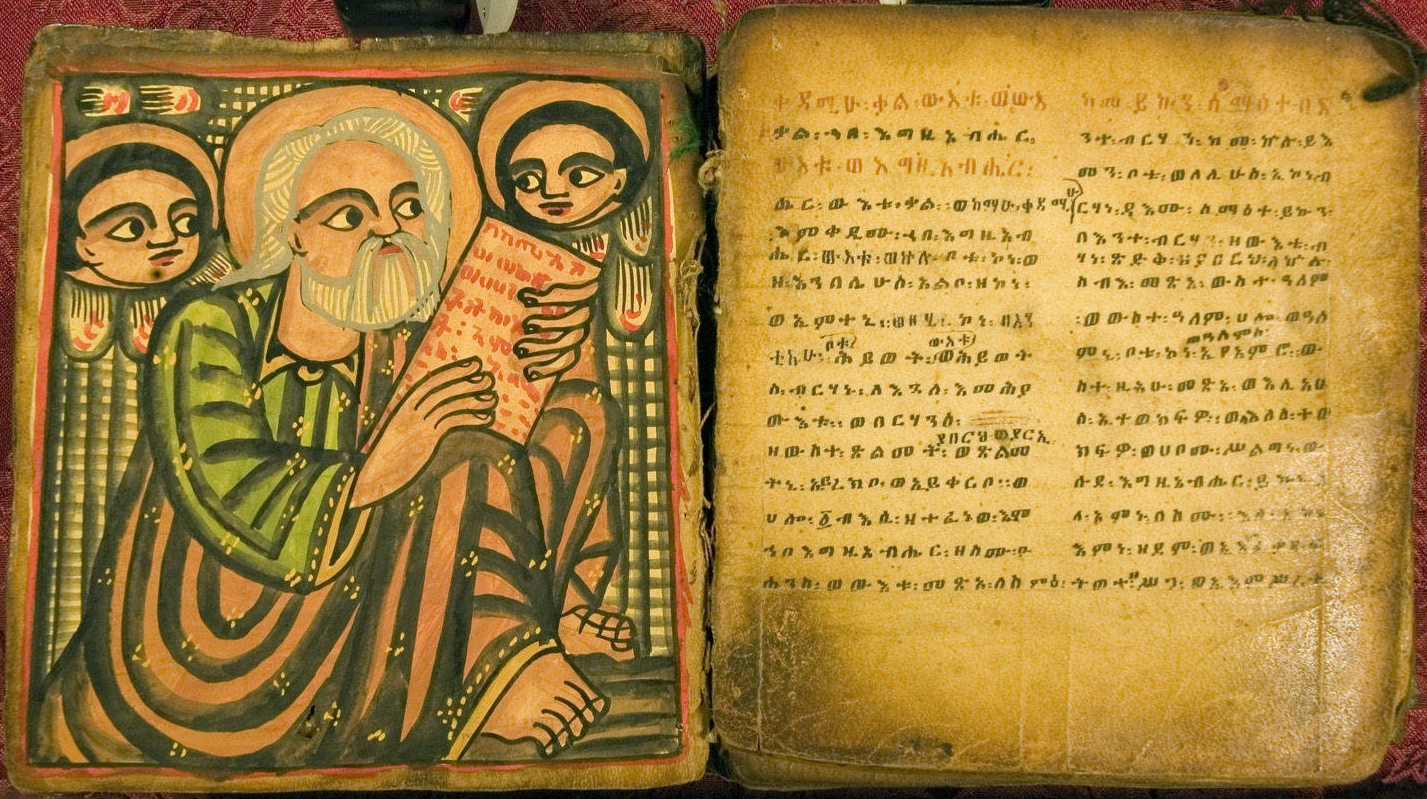
Biblical composite manuscript from 16th–18th century

Outstanding students despite striving in higher education, may earn the term "liq" or "debtera" and usually went ancient type of higher education typical to Amhara and Tigray Province. Education at this level had three branches: first Zema Bet (School of Music) and second was Kine Bet (School of Poetry) and the third was Metsahaf Bet (School of texts or books).

Zema Bet has three branches in its own: the first dealing with the study of Degua, the second dealing with Zemare (Eucharist Songs) and Mewaset (Songs for communications and funerals) and the third connected to Kedase (general liturgy). Each of these could be learning in the same institution in specialized localities. For example, monastery of Bethlehem in Begemder specialized in Degua while Zuramba in the same province was renown for Zemare and Mewaset, Serekula in Wadla (Wollo) and Debre Abay in Tigray were noted for Kedase.

Kine Bet concentrated on Sewasew (Ge'ez grammar), teaching twelve different types of composition, takes considerable memory and duration; Sewasew takes 13–19 years and 4 for Derset (composition). Kine schools were located in the monasteries of Woshara, Wadela and Goji in Gojjam Province. The main text was Metsahafe-Falasfa Tabiban (Book of Wise Philosopher), with passages derived from Plato, Aristotle, Diogenes, Cicero etc. Another important text was taken from 17th century Ethiopian philosopher Zera Yacob.

=== Skills ===
Although most educated debteras remained to church, they were largely scribes, copying texts from sacred books and petitioned for fee, running ecclesiastical affairs or set chronicles in courts of kings and nobles, who sometimes, were illiterate. Illiteracy is not critical matters on the ruling class, but were used as occult powers. One portal reported that Ras Alula of Eritrea could neither read nor write and Vanderheym reported that most Shewan nobles were illiterate and hired educated debteras to look after.

Illiteracy was not always confined to feudal nobility of the Ethiopian Empire since they paid no attention. In the mid-1880s, Flad (1923:87) collected numerous collection of Ethiopian manuscripts in private library in Magdala, suggesting Emperor Tewodros II was not able to write. Count Gleichen wrote in his 1898 book that upper classes only could write and read with exception of priests, and the Negus/Emperor himself had not ability to write/read unless hiring secretary to assist.

The most educated elites among the class was scribes of politically powerful; their prowess to draw secular power and literacy often brought stigmatization from society, labeling them "tenquai" (meaning wizard). The most ordinary debteras often vulnerable to many laymen. Ethiopian peasants believed that every natural phenomenon, even catastrophic, disease and deaths caused by the "incantation" of debteras. Moreover, most people flocked to them today to purchase amulets to safeguard against "evil eye", win them the "favors" of a higher official, or simply serve them as a "love potion".

== Other subjects ==
The Islamic education had two levels, the lower level, Tahaji, characterized by stage where students identified Arabic letters and memorized texts and the higher level, Mejlis, where students studying grammar, religion, politics and civic concepts. In this cases, monasteries were played crucial role for expansion of education.

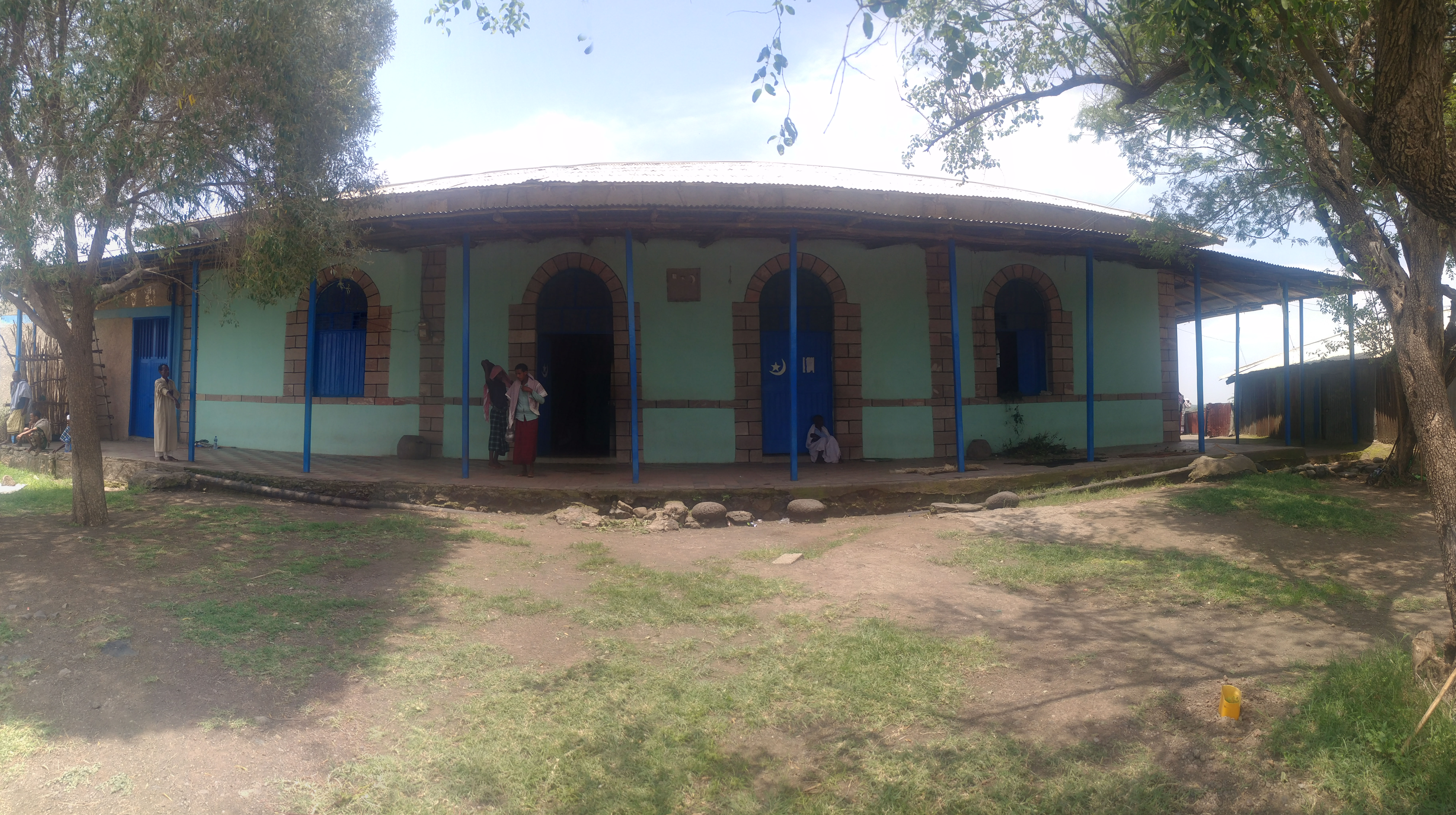
Mosque in Dana, a traditional Islamic education center

In 1617, the Portuguese Jesuits were active through northern part of Ethiopia, in Gondar and Tigray Province, to focus seminaries and mission school. They taught students to write Amharic and Portuguese languages in order to know the Bible thoroughly. Missionaries expansion was successful in the south region of Ethiopia, especially Afan Oromo speakers. In Welega, the Swedish missionaries trained Ethiopian Protestants to spread beliefs and translate Holy Bible to vernacular language (Afan Oromo) by renown translator Onesimos Nesib, popularly known as Abbaa Gammachiis, to spread medical facility and modernization through teaching the Bible. The chief leaders also used to prescribe Waaqeffanna in favor of strengthen European diplomatic ties.

There was great success in conversion to Protestantism between 1850s and 1860s rather than Catholicism as Emperor Tewodros II (r. 1855–1868) granted passionated introduction of European technology to Ethiopia and Protestant missionaries growing concurrently.

== Modernized education ==
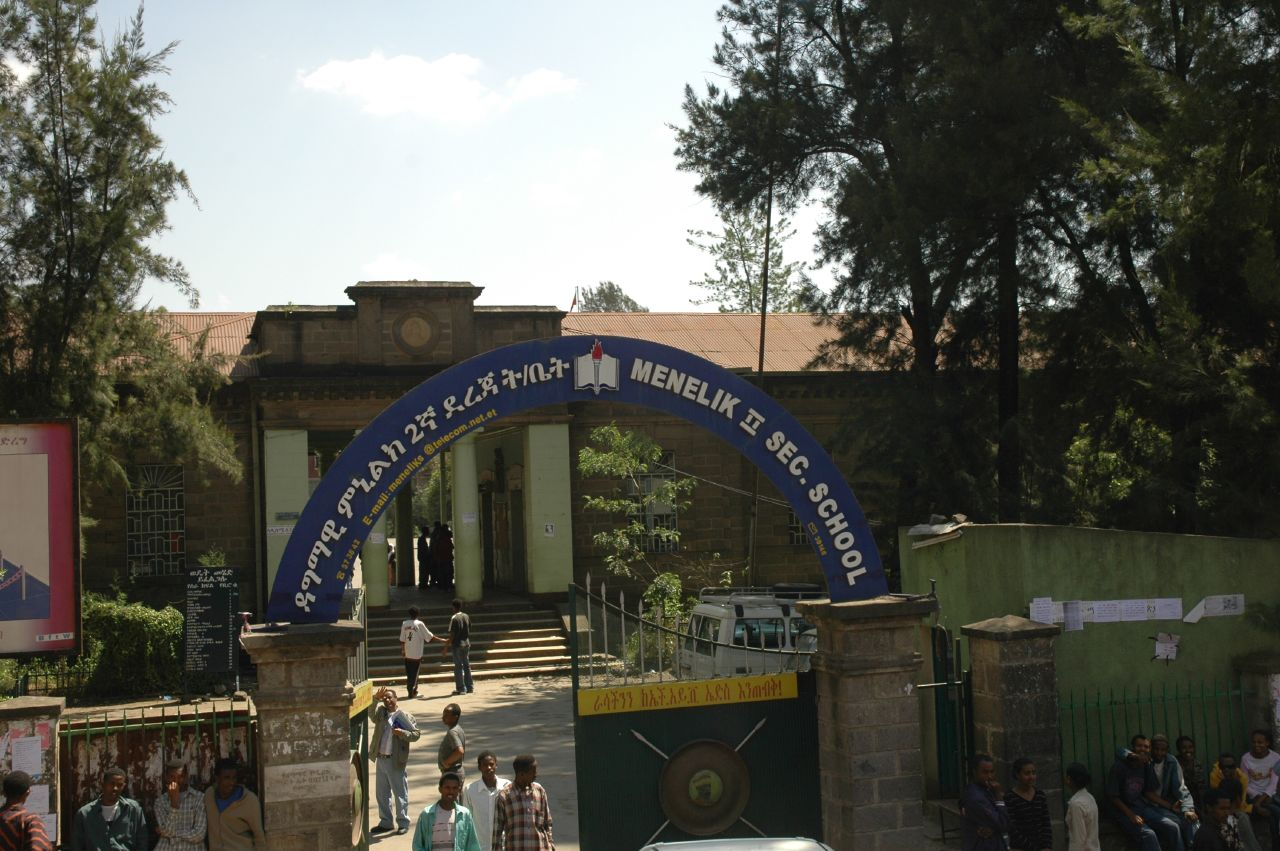
Menelik II School in Addis Ababa opened in 1908

Under Emperor Menelik II (r. 1889–1913) modernization, he forced to establish state-sponsored educational institution near his palace in Addis Ababa for sons of nobilities and aristocrats as general populace rejected such steps. Some scholars marked the beginning of modern education in Ethiopia with an establishment of Menelik II Primary and Secondary School in 1908. Main objectives of designated curriculum, despite retaining the traditional educational system, were to cultivate foreign relations by educating certain elites and to acquire knowledge in favor of foreign language.

Until 1929, the school was not ready for formal service, as traditional Orthodox church element permeating the curriculum.
