= American Baptist =

American Baptist may refer to any Baptist in the United States of America or one of the following:

- American Baptist Churches USA (ABCUSA), 1907 reorganization of the Triennial Convention, founded in 1814
- American Baptist Association, founded in 1924
- American Baptist Missionary Union, former name of the ABCUSA's international missionary society
- American Baptist College, Nashville, Tennessee, founded in 1924
