= William T. Amiger =

American academic administrator, educator, minister (1870–1929)

William Thomas Amiger
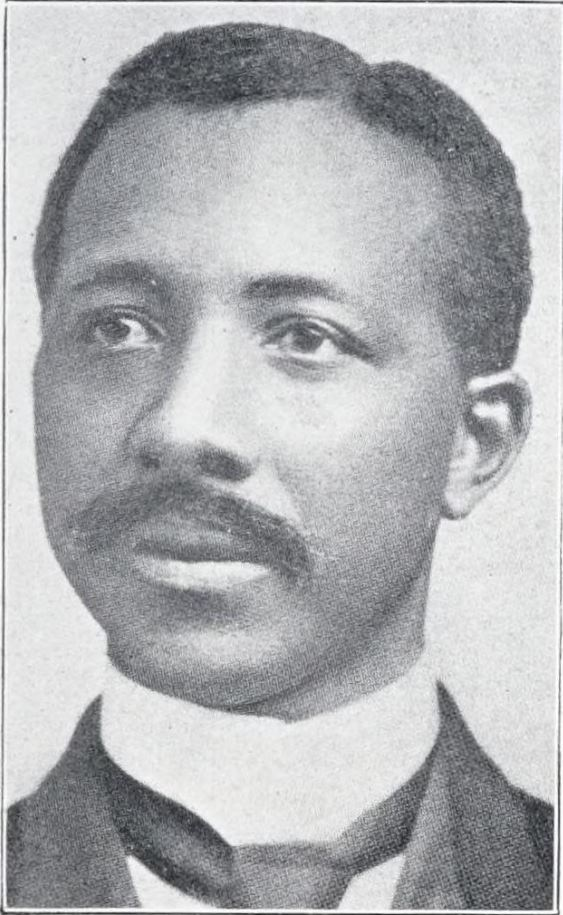

President of State University at Louisville
- In office 1908–1916
- Preceded by: Charles L. Purce
- Succeeded by: Charles Parrish

1st Acting President of American Baptist Theological Seminary
- In office September 14, 1924 – 1925
- Succeeded by: Sutton Griggs

3rd President of American Baptist Theological Seminary
- In office 1926 – May 1929
- Preceded by: Sutton Griggs
- Succeeded by: J. H. Garnett

Personal details
- Born: July 16, 1870 Culpeper, Virginia, United States
- Died: May 26, 1929 (aged 58) Nashville, Tennessee, United States
- Resting place: Mount Lawn Cemetery, Sharon Hill, Pennsylvania, United States
- Spouse: Eleanor Green (1892–)
- Children: 5
- Education: Lincoln University, State University of New York at Geneseo
- Occupation: Minister, missionary, academic administrator, college president, educator

Rev. William Thomas Amiger (1870–1929) also known as W.T. Amiger, was an American college president, academic administrator, Baptist minister, missionary, and educator. He was the president of State University at Louisville (now Simmons College of Kentucky) in Louisville, Kentucky; and president of American Baptist Theological Seminary (now American Baptist College) in Nashville, Tennessee. Amiger was a missionary in Liberia, West Africa.

== Early life and education ==
William Thomas Amiger was born on July 16, 1870, in Culpeper, Virginia, to parents Margaret Alexander and Howland Amiger.

For preparatory education, Amiger attended State Normal School (now State University of New York at Geneseo) in Geneseo, New York; followed by study at Lincoln University near Oxford, Pennsylvania where he received a 1899 B.A. degree, 1902 M.A. degree, and 1902 S.T.B. degree. He did additional study in 1903, at Newton Theological Institution (later Newton Theological Seminary) in Newton, Massachusetts.

Amiger and Eleanor Green married in 1892, and together they had five children.

== Career ==
He was ordained as a Baptist minister in 1903, in Cambridge, Massachusetts. Amiger worked for as a pastor at Third Baptist Church in Springfield, Massachusetts from July 1903 until 1908; followed by two months of work in 1908 as the main pastor at Myrtle Baptist Church in West Newton, Massachusetts, succeeding L.C. Parrish.

He served as president of State University at Louisville (now Simmons College of Kentucky) in Louisville, Kentucky, starting in 1908 until 1916.

From 1918 to 1919 during World War I, Amiger served as a first lieutenant chaplain in the U.S. Army, assigned to Camp Hill in south Newport News, Virginia. He was a missionary in Liberia, West Africa with the National Baptist Foreign Missionary Society (also known as the American Baptist Missionary Union) from 1919 until 1923.

Amiger served as president of American Baptist Theological Seminary (now American Baptist College) in Nashville, Tennessee, from 1924 to 1925; and from 1926 until his death in May 1929.

He was a member of the National Teachers Association, the National Geographic Society, and the Religious Education Association. Amiger was awarded honorary degrees from Lincoln University (D.D. in 1909), and Central Law School (L.L.D. in 1912) in Louisville, Kentucky. His profile is included in the books, An Era of Progress and Promise, 1863–1910 (1910), and Who's Who Among the Colored Baptists of the United States (1913).

== Death ==
On May 23, 1929, Amiger was in Nashville and tried to catch a train to Philadelphia to join his family, when he collapsed. He had a decline in his health leading up to the collapse. He died on May 26, 1929, at Hubbard Hospital in Nashville. He was buried at Mount Lawn Cemetery in Sharon Hill, Pennsylvania.

== See also ==
- Military history of African Americans
