= AfroDroids =

- Type: Privately held company
- Industry: Digital artwork
- Founded: September 1st, 2021
- Founders: Owo Anietie
- Headquarters: Nigeria
- Area served: Africa, Global
- Key people: Owo Anietie (CEO)
- Products: NFT, cryptocurrencies
- Website: https://www.afrodroids.io/

AfroDroids is a blockchain-based collection of digital artwork composed of non-fungible tokens (NFTs). It was inspired by the Afrofuturist movement in art. On September 1, 2021, Owo Anietie established AfroDroids.

Afrofuturism is a collection of media and artists who have a common interest in imagining black futures based on Afro-diasporic experiences, to address themes and challenges of the African diaspora through technoculture and science fiction.

AfroDroids is a 12k PFP NFT project that depicts human life through the eyes of Africans. Each Afrodroid is a piece of art with increasing value and a number of hidden benefits that become apparent as the project advances.

There have been a total of 12,117 AfroDroids By Owo NFTs. At least one AfroDroids By Owo NTF is now in the wallets of 3,642 owners.

== History ==
AfroDroids By Owo is well-positioned to provide easy access to both artists and buyers. It is one of the few African art initiatives that uses NFTs to reshape the art world. The work began as the Profile Picture Project, a 12k Ethereum blockchain project. The development of AfroDroids was spurred by NFT's ability to watermark a variety of works without the requirement for a signature. A total of 12,117 unique afrodroid nfts were minted on opensea.io.

When AfroDroids by Owo originally started, it allowed anybody to purchase photographs or artwork to use as digital avatars on their social media pages. Every AfroDroid pays tribute to its African roots with earrings, beads, and other native components. AfroDriods contribute to charity in addition to rewriting the narrative of artists using NFTs.

== Founder ==
Owo Anietie is one of the most influential Nigerians in the NFT industry. In 2009, he started his work as a professional artist, then moved on to motion design, animation, and digital illustration in 2012.

Through NFTs, Anietie is already creating an African ecosystem for global-minded artists. To do this, he launched AfroDroids By Owo on September 1, 2021, which is regarded as Africa's largest PFP.

Owo Anietie is a Nigerian 3D afrofuturism artist who uses a cultural philosophy of science and history to examine the coming intersection of African Diaspora Culture and technology. Anietie is known for not watermarking his art, allowing people to freely use it as long as they don't sell or misuse it.

He worked as a motion graphic designer, senior motion designer, and creative director at Anakle Limited, Patricia, and Creators Capital, respectively. Pop and R&B singer Justin Bieber, record producer and industry mogul Don Jazzy, to mention a few, have also acquired his works.

Anietie's ambition for the next 50 years is to make and release one piece of art every day. He uses his formal talents in advertising, building technology, and multidisciplinary art to develop his 3D and motion design-led approach. In a featured interview with GQ South Africa, the Afrodroids program was regarded as one of Africa's most important NFT initiatives, with a value that goes beyond the art works themselves.

== Philanthropy ==
- The Dream Catcher; On March 24, 2022, the Afrodroids community commissioned the Dream Catchers Academy for Girls initiative to operate this academy, which would give formal and artistic education to destitute / orphaned girls.
- Afrodroids donated $500k+ (20% of sales) to a foundation that supports girl education in Africa.

== Afrodroids In The Metaverse ==
On November 15, 2021, the inaugural AfroDroids Rave took place. CryptoVoxels, a virtual world and metaverse powered by the Ethereum blockchain, and AfroDroids acquired land there where players may personalize their avatars and construct structures on their piece of land.

== See also ==
- NFTs
- Web3
- Decentralized autonomous organization
- Black science fiction
