= Yayne Abäba =

1955 novel by Makonnen Endelkachew

Yayne Abäba is a short novel by the Ethiopian writer, politician, and onetime Prime Minister of Ethiopia, Makonnen Endelkachew. The story features the adventures of a young girl named Yayne Abäba, which means "flower of my eye". It is one of the earliest modern works of science fiction in Islamic literature, and is considered a seminal work in black science fiction. It is sometimes described as containing elements of a cosmic, Lovecraftian horror.

== Publication history ==
The story first appeared as the eponymously titled "Yayne Abäba". In later publications, this story came to be known as "Aläm Wärätäna", variously translated into English as "The Inconsistent World", "Fickle World", or "Unstable People". There is not scholarly consensus on when the story was first published, and its first publication date is variously reported as 1945, 1947, 1948, or 1955. Likewise, there are several disagreeing accounts of when the story was first written, in 1948 or 1917. Endelkachew himself was once quoted as saying he'd written it (or some version of it) in 1909 as an anti-slavery story, when he would have been 19 years old.

The story was originally published in a collection titled Bitwoded: Three Plays. It was translated into English in 2007 by K. M. Simon, and published under the title The City of the Poor.

== Plot ==
In the story, Abäba, an adolescent girl of the Amhara people, is trafficked into slavery. After she escapes her captors, she goes on numerous adventures until finally reuniting with her family. There is a fantastical dream sequence in which she employs a microscope to look behind the superficialities of the world to see the frightening true realities that lie beneath.
