= The Comet (short story) =

1920 short story by W. E. B. Du Bois

"The Comet" is a science fiction short story written by W. E. B. Du Bois in 1920. It discusses the relationship between Jim Davis, a black man, and Julia, a wealthy white woman, after a comet strike unleashes toxic gases that kill everyone in New York except them.

Originally published as the tenth chapter of Du Bois's Darkwater: Voices From Within the Veil, "The Comet" was reprinted in the 2000 anthology Dark Matter: The Anthology of Science Fiction, Fantasy and Speculative Fiction by Black Writers. It helped lay the foundation for a movement that later became known as Afrofuturism.

== Plot summary ==
"The messenger", a man named Jim, descends into the lower vaults of the bank where he works to complete a task for the president. Jim silently considers his frustration with the task while the conversation of his superiors revolves around discussion of "the comet" which is to pass near the Earth soon.

While Jim is completing his assignment, the great stone door of the vault mysteriously closes shut. When Jim finds his way out and returns to street level, he discovers that the vault clerk and everyone else he encounters is dead. Jim walks up Fifth Avenue, enters a restaurant where he previously would not have been allowed to eat, and eventually finds a car and drives around the city but still finds no other living person.

Near 72nd Street, Jim hears a woman's voice crying out from the upper window of a home. The survivor is a wealthy, young white woman who is surprised to discover the only other survivor, her would-be hero, is a Black man. The two travel to Harlem, where Jim searches for his family, and the bank where the woman's father works, but find no more living people and only a note at the bank from the woman's father. They attempt to contact the outside world by placing a call on a long-distance telephone but receive no response.

The two grow less uneasy with each other and return to the bank. They seem on the verge of overcoming their racial barriers in an act of procreation for the survival of the human race, when suddenly a group of men arrive, revealing that only New York was affected by the comet. The woman's father and fiancé have returned; the woman, Julia, leaves Jim to join them. The men question if Jim has acted inappropriately to Julia and suggest lynching him, but Julia says that Jim saved her, though she is unable to look at him anymore. Her father gives Jim a cash reward. At the very end, a Black woman parts from the group and rushes into Jim's arms after calling out his name.

== Themes ==
=== Religion ===
The short story contains several religious themes. From the start of the story, the narrator refers to Jim as "the messenger" rather than by his first name, which the reader learns later. At first, this title seems to describe his employment. However, the idea of a messenger is well established in Christian mythology as related to being an angel of God, like Gabriel, who relayed God's message to the Virgin Mary that she would bear Jesus Christ. Additionally, the two main characters of the story, Jim and Julia, begin to seem like Adam and Eve figures, as they are seemingly the only people left alive in the world. Julia comes to think of herself as the "mighty mother of all men to come and Bride of Life" and of Jim as "her Brother Humanity incarnate, Son of God and great 'All-Father' [i.e., the founder or progenitor] of the race to be". Julia's comments paint Jim as both an Adam figure ("All-Father of the race to be") and a Jesus figure ("Son of God"). Julia's own status as the figure of Eve, who betrayed Adam and all of humanity, is enhanced by the fact that her father and fiancé show up, destroying her future with Jim and their plans to continue the line of the human race. At the end of the story, she and Jim are stripped of their status as religious figures when they discover that only New York has been destroyed by the comet.

=== Black speculative fiction ===
In portraying a Black man as the last and first man of humanity, W. E. B. Du Bois is engaging in Black speculative fiction, and helping to develop a genre that would later be characterized as Afrofuturism. As Womack argues, Du Bois writes as an Afrofuturist to re-imagine the past and future of African Americans in order to revise the historical and diasporic narrative. In the Afrofuturist narrative, blackness is source of pride, establishing a space where Black culture can thrive: "In Du Bois' analogy, race imbalances were so entrenched that only a catastrophe could bring equity".

Du Bois situated Jim as the destiny of humankind, the man onto whom the responsibility to repopulate the earth is bestowed. Considering the story through the lens of Afrofuturism, Du Bois reclaims and rewrites the origin story in order to re-imagine the African American future-past. In revising the origin story, a story traditionally associated with Protestantism and whiteness, Du Bois is able to recover the beginning of a narrative that, from an Afrofuturist perspective will otherwise eventually dismiss and disregard the Black experience. Through the course of this re-imagined origin story, Du Bois moves Jim, who was relegated to the task of going deep underground to retrieve records from the bank vault, to become the vital source of human life. In doing so, Du Bois has, effectively, re-imagined the experience of becoming human and establishing humanity, more specifically, Black humanity. Du Bois reclaims Black humanity through recasting the narrative source of human existence: the origin story and the story of the savior.

=== The color line ===
In "The Comet", W. E. B. Du Bois uses the apocalyptic setting to briefly suspend the "color line," revealing both its constructed nature and its persistence. When Jim and Julia believe they are the only survivors, the social structures enforcing racial hierarchy disappear, allowing them to interact as equals. However, this equality is temporary. The reappearance of others immediately restores the racial order, as seen in Julia's father's alarm at her closeness to Jim. Du Bois shows that the "color line" is not just individual prejudice but a deeply embedded social structure that quickly reasserts itself.

== See also ==
- Black science fiction
- Earth Abides
- The World, the Flesh and the Devil

== Bibliography ==
- Collins, Michael (2020), "W. E. B. Du Bois's Neurological Modernity: I.Q., Afropessimism, Genre", in The Triangle Collective (ed.), The Palgrave Handbook of Twentieth and Twenty-First Century Literature and Science, Palgrave Handbooks of Literature and Science, Palgrave Macmillan, pp. 559–576, doi:10.1007/978-3-030-48244-2_32, ISBN 978-3-030-48243-5, S2CID 238072805.
- Davidson, Joe P. L. (2020), "Ugly Progress: W. E. B. Du Bois's Sociology of the Future", The Sociological Review, 69 (2): 382–395, doi:10.1177/0038026120954330, S2CID 225186449.
- Elia, Adriano (2014), "The Languages of Afrofuturism", Lingue e Linguaggi, 12: 83–96, doi:10.1285/i22390359v12p83.
- Fiorelli, Julie A. (2014), "Imagination Run Riot: Apocalyptic Race-War Novels of the Late 1960s", Mediations: Journal of the Marxist Literary Group, 28 (1): 127–152.
- Gallardo C., Ximena (2013), "Aliens, Cyborgs and Other Invisible Men: Hollywood's Solutions to the Black 'Problem' in SF Cinema", Science Fiction Film and Television, 6 (2): 219–251, doi:10.3828/sfftv.2013.16.
- Rabaka, Reiland (2006), "W. E. B. DuBois's "The Comet" and Contributions to Critical Race Theory: An Essay on Black Radical Politics and Anti-Racist Social Ethics", Ethnic Studies Review, 29: 22–48, doi:10.1525/esr.2006.29.1.22, S2CID 148741204.
- Schneider, Ryan (2003), "Sex and the Race Man: Imagining Interracial Relationships in W. E. B. Du Bois's Darkwater", Arizona Quarterly: A Journal of American Literature, Culture, and Theory, 59 (2): 59–80, doi:10.1353/arq.2003.0024, S2CID 144468563.
- Smith, Darryl A. (2007), "Droppin' Science Fiction: Signification and Singularity in the Metapocalypse of Du Bois, Baraka, and Bell", Science Fiction Studies, 34 (2): 201–219, doi:10.1525/sfs.34.2.201, JSTOR 4241522.
- Wallinger, Hanna (2017), "Utopian Hope in W. E. B. Du Bois's 'The Comet'" (PDF), in Saskia Fürst; Yvonne Kaisinger; Ralph J. Poole (eds.), US American Expressions of Utopian and Dystopian Visions, LIT Verlag, pp. 139–157, ISBN 978-3-643-90931-2.
- Yaszek, Lisa (2006), "Afrofuturism, Science Fiction, and the History of the Future", Socialism and Democracy, 20 (3): 41–60, doi:10.1080/08854300600950236, S2CID 20605379.
- Zamalin, Alex (2019), "W. E. B. Du Bois's World of Utopian Intimacy", Black Utopia, Columbia University Press, pp. 49–62, doi:10.7312/zama18740-005, ISBN 9780231547253, S2CID 241453554.
