= The First Cathedral =

Coordinates: 41.8337°N 72.6992°W

- The First Cathedral – A Church for all people
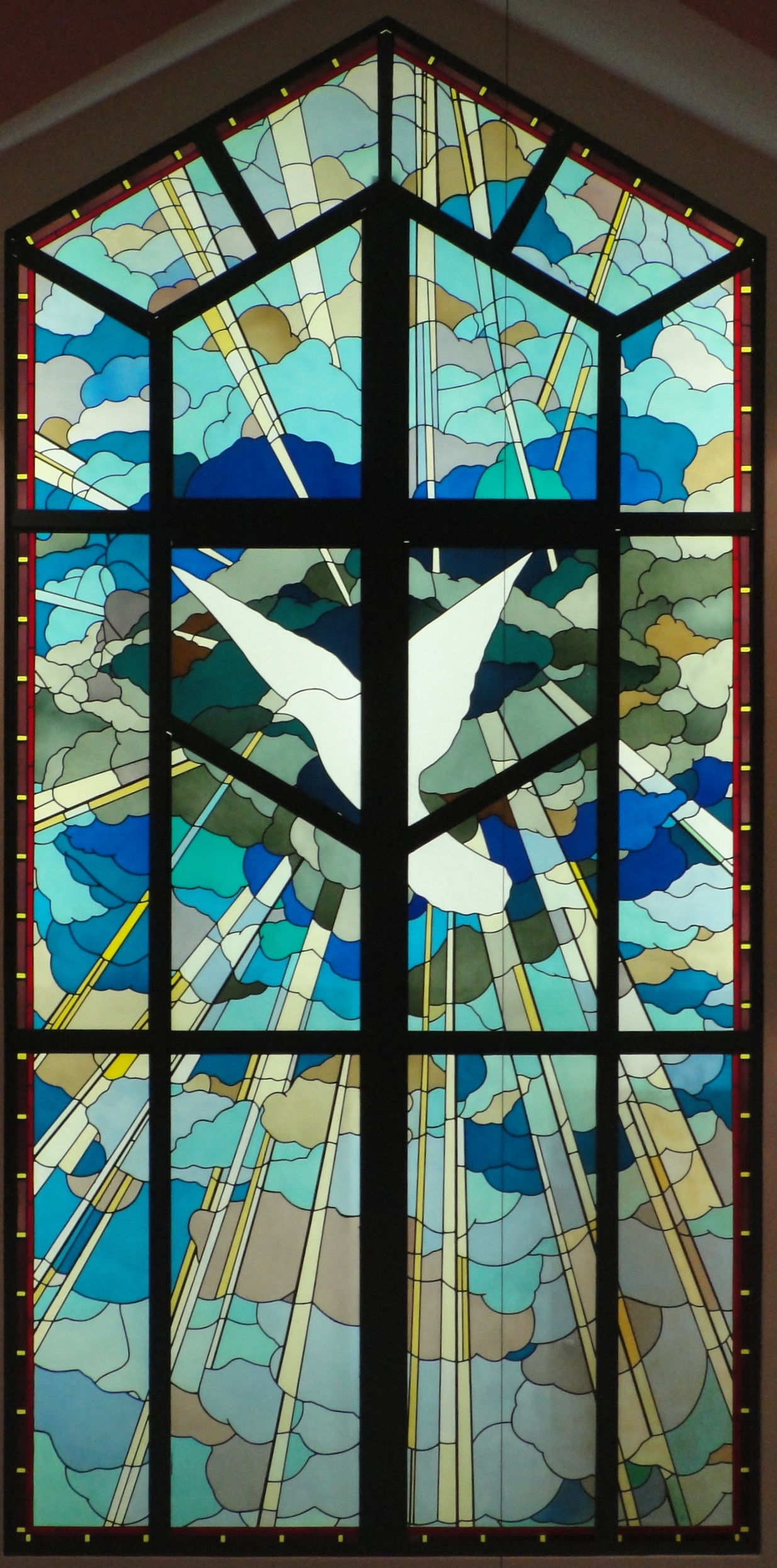
- Lancet window in The First Cathedral Sanctuary
- The First Cathedral
- Location: 1151 Blue Hills Avenue, Bloomfield, Connecticut
- Country: United States
- Denomination: Baptist
- Website: The First Cathedral

History
- Founded: April 12, 1968
- Founder: Rev. Edward R. King
- Dedicated: September 4, 1999

Architecture
- Architect(s): TMA Architects/Russell & Dawson Architecture and Engineering of East Hartford, Connecticut
- Style: Post-Modern Cathedral
- Years built: 1997–1999

Clergy
- Pastor: Co Pastor Michael Bailey Assistant Pastor LeRoy Bailey III

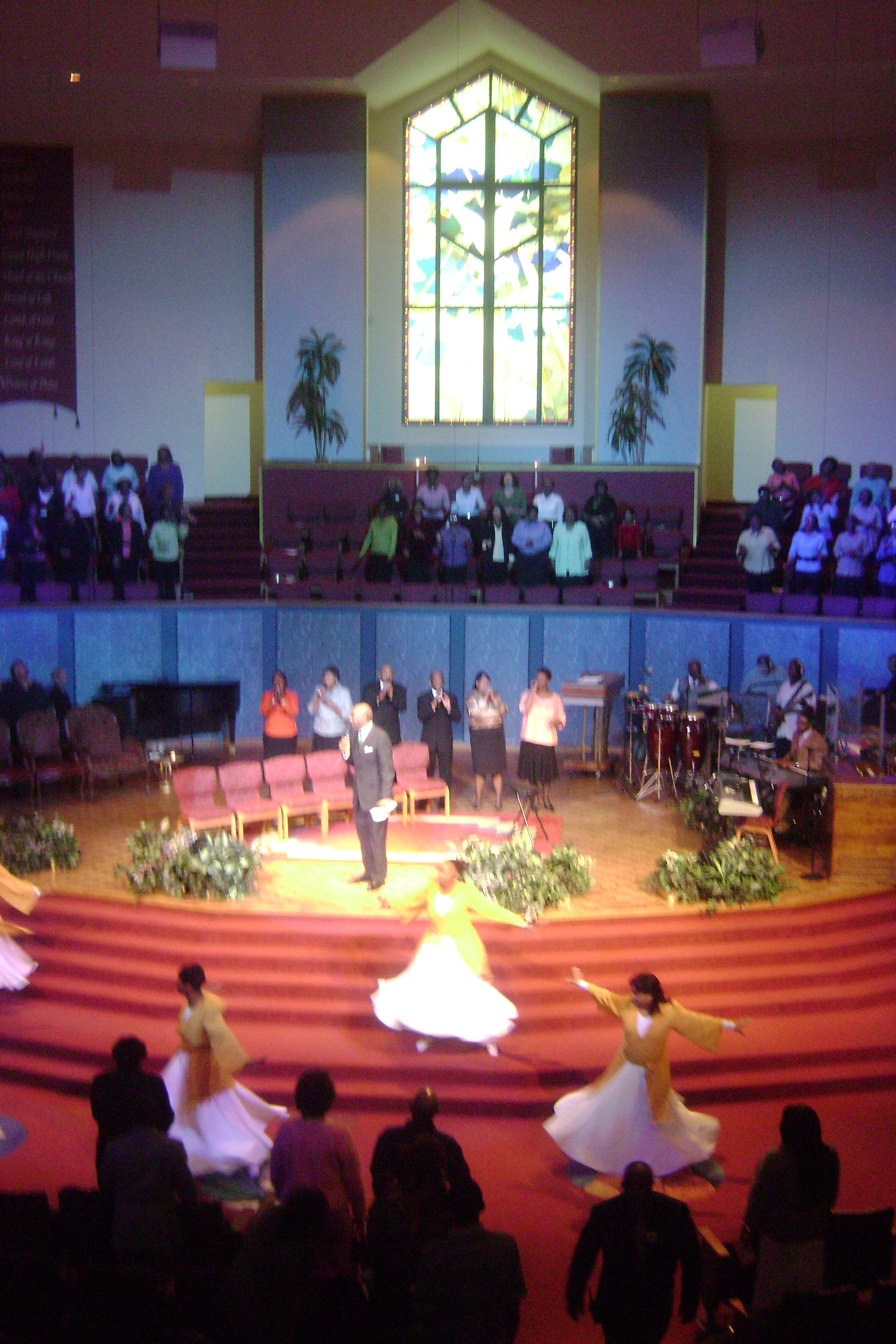
The First Cathedral in Sunday Morning Worship

The First Cathedral, originally known as First Baptist Church, is a Black Baptist congregation in Hartford, Connecticut.

It is the fifteenth oldest historically black church founded in the city and the third congregation to be known as First Baptist Church of Hartford. Its pastor is Archbishop LeRoy Bailey, Jr.

== History ==
=== Milestones in development ===
- 1968, On April 12, The church is founded with Rev. Edward R. King and 100 charter members.
- 1970, Rev. Thomas Tate served as interim pastor
- 1971, Rev. Dr. LeRoy Bailey Jr. begins his tenure as second pastor.
- 1971, The church launches radio broadcast
- 1972, The church joins American Baptist Convention and National Baptist Convention.
- 1977, In September, the church moves to a larger facility.
- The church becomes known as The First Baptist Church of Hartford,
- 1981, The church begins its school of ministry.
- 1987, The first of two apartment buildings for the elderly, managed by the First Baptist Housing Development Corporation were constructed. The second is completed in 1990. (Cathedral Manors)
- 1988, The church began annual Christmas program, with drama and singing functions as first faith-based performing arts conservatory in Southern New England.
- 1989, The church bookstore is launched.
- 1993, A mission in Kenya was started.
- 1997, The Praises of Zion, one of The First Cathedral's choirs, releases their first album, "Incredible", .
- 1997, The church began construction on the Cathedral Edifice.
- 1999, In September, The church moves to the Cathedral Edifice.
- 2001, In October, Bishop LeRoy Bailey Jr was consecrated into the International Bishops Conference with jurisdiction over North America and the Caribbean, with rights of succession.
- 1997, The Praises of Zion releases their second album "Forgetting What's Behind",
- 2003, Bishop Bailey published "A Solid Foundation: Building Your Life from the Ground Up"
- 2004, All-Purpose Playfields are completed on the cathedral's campus.
- 2004, The church adopted 16 churches in Bangladesh.
- 2006, Bishop LeRoy Bailey Jr. is appointed Archbishop of the International Bishops Conference, USA becoming known as Archbishop LeRoy Bailey Jr.
- 2007, The church built 3 churches in Peru and one additional church in Bangladesh.
- 2007, The church built 15 wells in Bangladesh, serving an estimated 30,000 to 50,000 residents.
- 2008, The church builds a 40,000 dollar orphanage in Uganda.
- 2008, The Praises of Zion records and releases their third album, "I Believe".
- 2009, "Discovering your Power" begins broadcasts both locally and nationally.
- 2015, The Praises of Zion records and releases their fourth album, "Gospel Extravaganza.

=== LeRoy Bailey Jr. ===
In February 1971, LeRoy Bailey Jr, an assistant minister at Golden Leaf Baptist Church in Memphis, Tennessee was called to be the second pastor of the First Baptist Church. He was licensed to preach in 1958; and ordained in 1966 by L. A. Hamblin. Bailey, a 1970 graduate of The College of the Bible at American Baptist College in Social Science. As an undergraduate, Bailey served as the 1969–1970 co-chairman of the student-faculty relations committee, chairman of the recruitment committee of the School of Religion and the National president of Alpha Theta Nu Omega theological fraternity.

He completed his master's degree at Howard University School of Religion in Practical Theology in 1971. While attending Howard, he received the Maynard award for preaching.

Upon his arrival to Hartford, Bailey served as state representative for the Connecticut Convention of American Baptist Churches USA, an auditor for the Connecticut Missionary Baptist Convention, chairman of the social action committee of the Ministerial Inter-denominational Alliance of Greater Hartford, and a general member of the board of directors of The North Hartford churches for the Aging, Bellevue Square Boys Club, The Hartford Chapter of 70001 Ltd. and the Family Service Society in Hartford, Connecticut.

Bailey served as the State representative for the Connecticut Convention of American Baptist Churches on the American Baptist Churches USA 'Key 73' evangelistic committee.

In 1972, Bailey galvanized the church to transition from a house church to purchase its first building, register with the National Baptist Convention and the American Baptist Convention, and launch a syndicated radio broadcast.

In 1975, Bailey led efforts to secure the former Agudas Achim temple in Hartford, Connecticut. The building had suffered a 'great deal' of vandalism during a ten-year tenure as a property used for civic and social functions. Bailey raised 135,000 dollars (611,000.00 in 2015) to purchase the building from the previous owners.

In 1976–1977, Bailey led a congregation effort to revitalize the building, repairing the structure of the building. The revitalization was cited by a contractor to cost 400,000 dollars (1,810,000.00 in 2015), the project was competed for only 60,000. ($271,000.00 in 2015).

From 1986–1999, Bailey led the church in a series of capital campaigns to construct a housing complex, secure additional properties and construct The First Cathedral, in Bloomfield, Connecticut.

In 2006, Bailey, established the American chapter of The International Bishops Conference.

Under Bailey's leadership, the church's membership has grown tremendously. As of 2005, the membership numbered over 11,000 making the cathedral the largest church in the New England Region.

== Controversy ==
The First Cathedral rents its facility to several local and regional organizations, including several local high schools including Windsor High School In Windsor, Connecticut, South Windsor High School in South Windsor, Connecticut, Enfield High School and Enrico Fermi High School in Enfield, Connecticut. In 2010, after the ACLU of Connecticut and Americans United informed the schools that continued use of the Bloomfield facility constituted a violation of the First Amendment's "establishment clause", which prohibits governmental entities from acting in a way that could be viewed as endorsing a religion. The high schools in Windsor, South Windsor, Enfield, East Hartford, and the Metropolitan Learning Center, a magnet school, subsequently decided against using First Cathedral.

=== Same-sex marriage ===
In 2003, Bailey and other ministers paid for an advertisement in the Hartford Courant affirming their opposition to same-sex marriage. This was part of a larger statement he and other ministers made which included the claims that, if same-sex couples are provided the same marriage rights as opposite-sex couples, ministers would be forced against their will to perform same-sex marriage ceremonies. Bailey is an adviser to the Family Institute of Connecticut.

== Ministries ==
- 2002, Churches Covered and Connected in Covenant (C4) a forum for churches of diverse denominations, ethnicity and geographic locations.
- 2004, Began a physical and spiritual health ministry. (The Good Life Wellness Center)
- 2006, Began a Christian catering service. (First Harvest)
- Multilingual/Translation Ministry Sign Language Ministry.
- Annual Multicultural month.
- Praises Of Zion, an award-winning Gospel Music choir.

=== Annual events ===
- Covenant Conference
- Churches Covered and Connected in Covenant Conference (2001)
- Gospel explosion (2007)
- Pastoral anniversary celebration, March of every year
- Annual Christmas Production (1988)
- Winterfire (hosted by Pentecostals annually)

=== Ministry affiliations ===
The First Cathedral is affiliated with several Ministries:

- Churches United in Global Mission - A ministry of Crystal Cathedral in Garden Grove, California.
- Connecticut Coalition of Churches
- Pastors in Covenant
- Churches Covered and Connected in Covenant
- The Capital Region Conference of Churches

== Building ==
In 1998, the ministry at the time known as The First Baptist Church of Hartford broke ground on its first custom house of worship, on a 40-acre (160,000 m^{2}) plot in Bloomfield, Connecticut. Funding for the construction was raised via stewardship campaigns over twelve years. After two years of construction the 120,000 sq ft (11,000 m^{2}) first phase of the facility was completed. In the planning phases of the building, church officials planned to remain called The First Baptist Church of Hartford while occupying the edifice called The First Cathedral. The Ministry became known as The First Cathedral as individuals within the community who were unfamiliar with these plans began confusing the two.

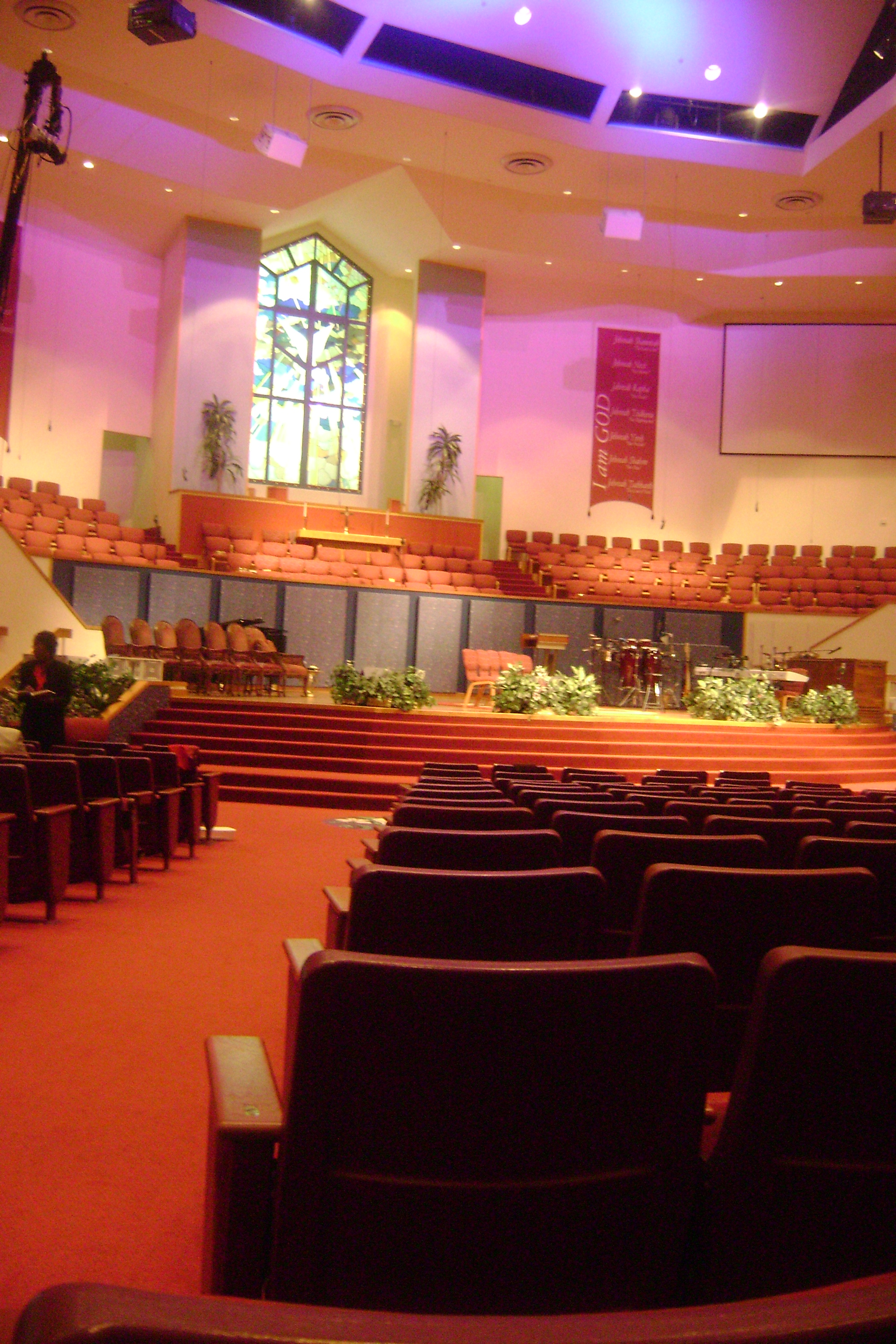
Built with the intention of being the final Building of The First Baptist Church, The First Cathedral is full of symbolism

The Cathedral Edifice is considered a radical departure from the Greek Revival and Georgian Architectural Styles used in the construction of most New England Churches.

The First Cathedral is half of the complex of what is intended to be the final location of The First Baptist Church, The First Cathedral is full of symbolism. Church officials worked with architects and engineers to create an environment that is full of theological and biblical symbolism.

=== Overall structure ===
The First Cathedral edifice is built in the shape of a dove, a reference to the Baptism of Jesus which is recorded in every canonized Gospel.

==== External symbolism ====
The Foundation The Doves' Feet are represented by the foundation of the Cathedral. The foundation of the Cathedral, being quite large and being located on former swampland, is a network of grade beams that equally disburse the weight of the building.

The structure

The structure of The Cathedral is divided into 3 levels: • The First Level is the two commercial floors, the primary representing earth, the second representing Heaven
• The Second Level is located within the second of the commercial floors, The Two Balconies representing Heaven.
• The Third Level is Represented in the Cupola, 8 sided, ordained with stained glass windows, symbolic of the throne room of Heaven where God is

Exterior walls

The immediate external wall of the Cathedral are covers with Dryvit, the dryvit wall installed in stages reminiscent of the extensive project, undertaken by Nehemiah, in the rebuilding of the city walls of Israel. Additionally the Sandstone Color of the building is a reminder of the Wilderness Experience of the Ancient Israelites before reaching their Promised Land.

==== Interior elements ====
Within the Dove shaped edifice, are three major components, The Grand Lobby, The Grand Concourse and The Sanctuary, modeled after Solomon's Temple.

==== The Grand Lobby ====
The Grand Lobby is the 'facade' of The First Cathedral; the lobby contains several symbolic elements:

•The entrance way is a set of double doors, creating an energy saving lock. The double set of double doors are reminiscent of the main entry way into an ancient city, the doors were part of the cities defense system.

•Stained glass mosaic-depicts people of all races and every ethnicity from all directions with their hands lifted in praise.

•Fountain - the fountain is in the shape of a tomb, the water shooting out of the fount comes in the form of cross representing life out of death.
