= Chatfield, Texas =

- Unincorporated community
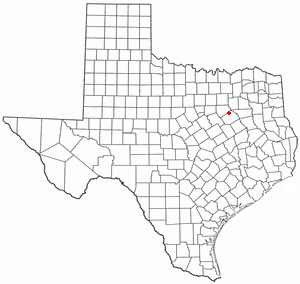
- Location of Chatfield, Texas
- Coordinates: 32°14′30″N 96°24′27″W
- Country: United States
- State: Texas
- County: Navarro
- Elevation: 430 ft (131 m)
- Time zone: UTC-6 (Central (CST))
  - Summer (DST): UTC-5 (CDT)
- ZIP code: 75105
- Area codes: 430 and 903
- GNIS feature ID: 1378115

Chatfield is an unincorporated community in northeastern Navarro County, Texas, United States, eleven miles northeast of Corsicana. The community lies along Farm to Market Road 1603, just northeast of Interstate 45.

== History ==
Chatfield was established as a trading post, on the San Antonio and Shreveport Trail, in an oak grove six miles west of Porter's Bluff, in 1838, and is named for pioneer Norman Chatfield. Other sources cite this pioneer's name as Champion Chatfield. Mr. Chatfield did not stay. The town was built up by a Captain Robert Hodge who moved from Kentucky to Texas. Captain Hodge purchased 1280 acres of land and moved his family to Chatfield in 1853. He was a successful plantation owner who built an antebellum home named "Hodge Oaks" in 1860. The "Hodge Oaks" house remained in the Hodge family until it was sold out of the family in 1993.

At one time, Chatfield had a furniture manufacturing facility, a boarding school along with a number of cotton gins, a post office and stores. The population peaked at approximately 500 in the 1890s. The railroad bypassed Chatfield and instead, chose to go through Corsicana, located about 15 miles southwest of Chatfield. This likely played a role in preventing further growth in the commerce and population of Chatfield.

== Notable people ==
- Sutton E. Griggs, author and Baptist minister.
- U.S. Army General Lucian Truscott was born in Chatfield in 1895.
- Will Coleman, believed to be the first African-American to practice veterinary medicine in Texas.

== Geography ==
Chatfield is in northeastern Navarro County, located at 32°14′30″N 96°24′27″W (32.24100, -96.41150).
