= Makonnen Endelkachew =

Prime Minister of Ethiopia from 1943 to 1957

Mekonnen Endelkachew
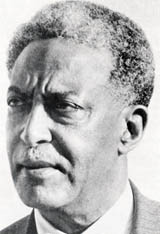

Prime Minister of Ethiopia
- In office 29 January 1943 – 1 November 1957
- Monarch: Haile Selassie I
- Preceded by: Position established
- Succeeded by: Abebe Aregai

Personal details
- Born: 16 February 1890 Addisge, Ethiopian Empire
- Died: 27 February 1963 (aged 73) Addis Ababa, Ethiopian Empire
- Party: Independent
- Relatives: Endelkachew Makonnen (son)

Ras Betwoded Mekonnen Endelkachew (Amharic: መኮንን እንዳልካቸው; 16 February 1890 – 27 February 1963) was an Ethiopian aristocrat and Prime Minister under Emperor Haile Selassie. Mekonnen was born in Addisge, the nephew of the noted Shewan general and politician Ras Betwoded Tessema Nadew, who introduced him to Emperor Menelik II. He was a member of the alpha class of the Menelik II School in Addis Ababa when it opened in 1908.

He was a published author, having written a novel, Yayne Abäba, and a booklet on the Second Italo-Abyssinian War and Fascist atrocities.

== Life ==
He was married twice. His second marriage, to the Emperor's niece, Princess Yeshashework Yilma, followed Makonnen's affair with the woman, who was married to the Tigrayan noble Ras Gugsa Araya Selassie at time. The affair threatened to destroy the accord Emperor Haile Selassie had carefully crafted, and led to Makonnen's recall from his post as Minister to Great Britain in 1932. Princess Yeshashwork was married to Bitwoded Makonnen Demissew after the death of her first husband, and would not marry Makonnen Endalkachew until after she was widowed for a second time during the Italian occupation, and her return from exile in 1941.

Makonnen accompanied Haile Selassie during his tour of Europe from 16 April to 4 September 1924. Following his recall from London, he served as Minister of the Interior, then governor of Illubabor Province; while governor, he led the troops of that province against the Italian invasion on the Ogaden front, afterwards going into exile from 1936 to 1941 in Jerusalem, and accompanying the Emperor back into Ethiopia upon the liberation of the country. Emperor Haile Selassie appointed him Minister of the Interior in March 1941, as part of the cabinet Haile Selassie established to re-assert Ethiopia's existence as an independent state against the views of the British War Office that, since Ethiopia had previously been Italian territory, the Emperor "cannot fully reassume his status and powers as Emperor until a peace treaty has been signed with Italy". However, as John Spencer points out, Ethiopia was able to rely on the principle of postliminium—that is, once enemy occupation is terminated, a state may act as if its existence had survived without interruption. "Having withdrawn its recognition of the Italian conquest," Spencer points out, "Britain was in no position to contest Ethiopia's application of the doctrine of postliminium." The conflict between Ethiopia and the United Kingdom over the former's sovereignty dominated their relations for the next several years.

From 29 January 1943, when the Emperor created the position, Makonnen served as Ethiopia's first Prime Minister, until his retirement on 1 November 1957. Bahre Zewde notes, however, that Makonnen "was a mere ceremonial figure, given more to intellectual pursuits than to political machinations. The de facto prime minister [during Makonnen's tenure] was Tsahafe T'ezaz Walda-Giyorgis Walda-Yohannes." Spencer notes that his fellow ministers considered him "as a lightweight." Makonnen then became the president of Ethiopian Senate from 1957 to 1961.

Although Makonnen led the delegation that represented Ethiopia at the summit in San Francisco that created the United Nations, because he was not fluent in either French or English he took no part in the debates.
