= Modern education in Ethiopia =

Modern education in Ethiopia introduced by Emperor Menelik II, who first opened the government school named Menelik II School in 1908 with proclamation issued in 1906. Despite being progressive, the modern education met with opposition from clergy and priests from Orthodox church, primarily the Coptic Orthodox. By 1913, provincial schools were expanded to Harar, Dessie and Ankober.

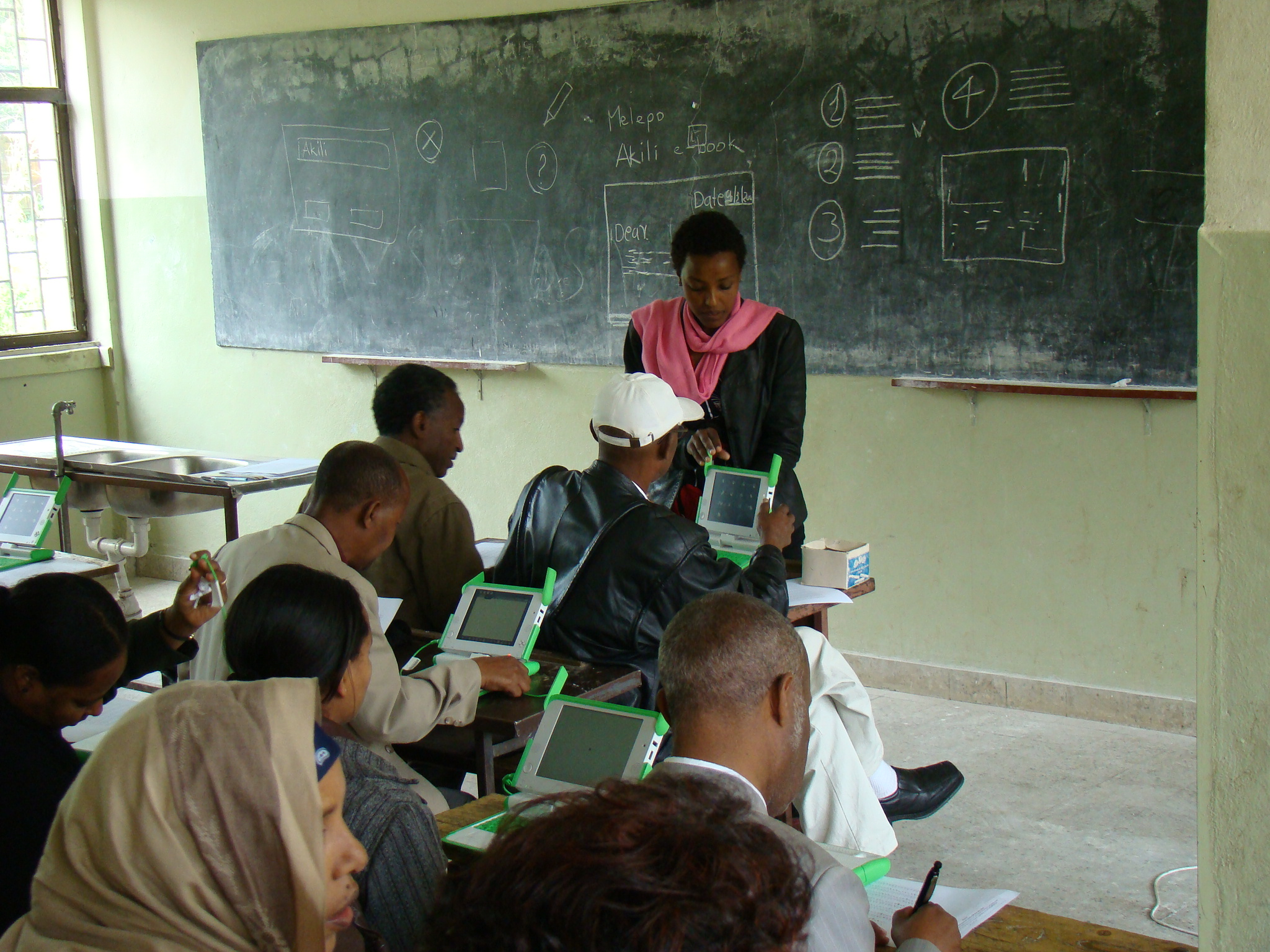
Teachers training with laptop at Menelik II School

The opposition decreased by the 1920s and subsequently Emperor Haile Selassie opened Teferi Mekonnen School and made hallmark of modern education since 1930. Haile Selassie helped to establish Ministry of Education and introduced European schools; French, Arabic, and Italian and English became the predominant languages of instruction during the era. American advisor Ernest Work introduced the first educational cycle consisted of 6 years of primary, 6 years of secondary, and 4 years university education.

During the Derg regime, new education policy enacted embracing socialist ideology and chartered by the National Democratic Revolution (NDR) in 1976, further elaborated five volume policy documents known as General Directives of Ethiopian Education produced by the Ministry of Education in 1980. The literacy rate was increased by this era compared to Haile Selassie regime, enrollment increased from 224,934 in 1959–1960 to 1,042,900 in 1974–1975, about 15% per annum.

== From Menelik to Zewditu ==
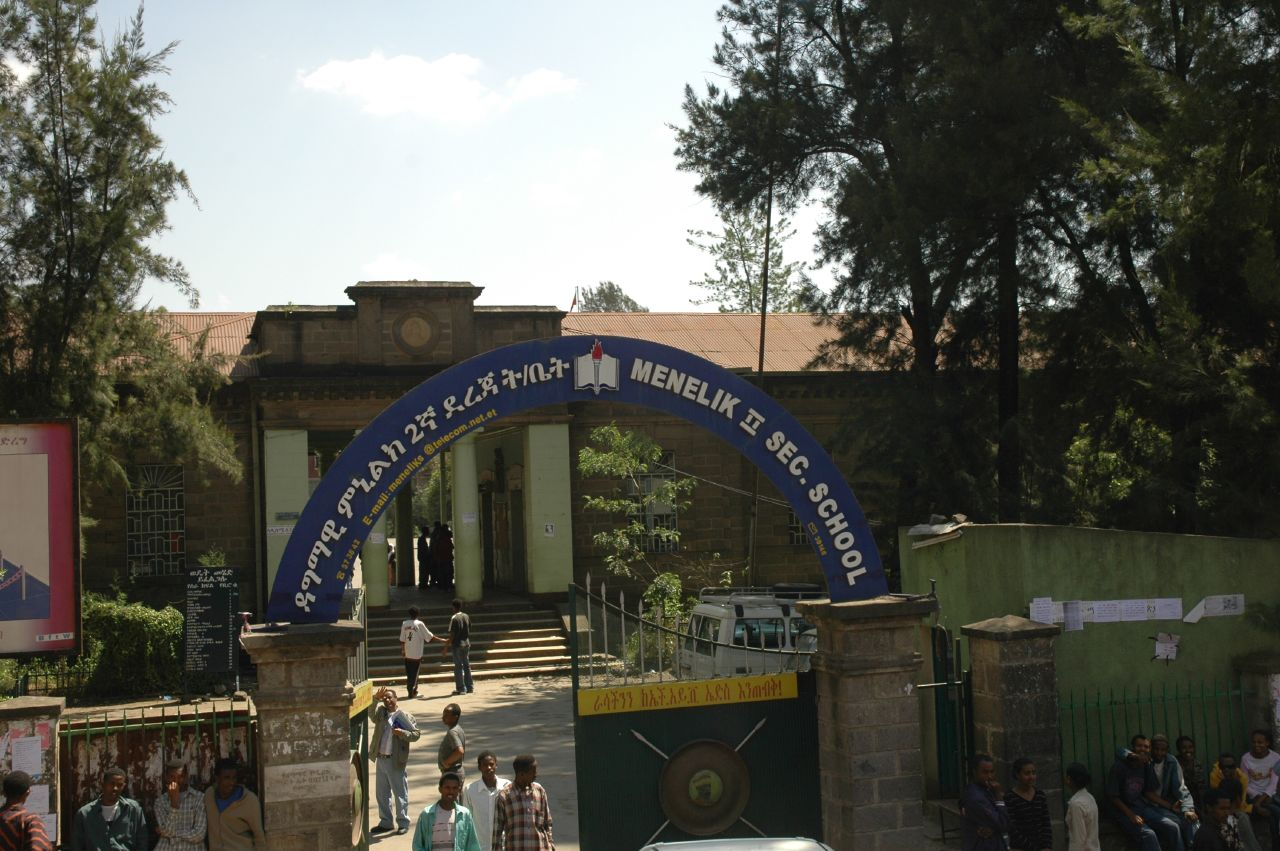
Menelik II School was the first modern school in Ethiopia opened in 1908

Modern education in Ethiopia was commenced after the reign of Emperor Menelik II, who then opened the first school, Menelik II School, in 1908. Before that, he issued a proclamation in 1906 that reads:

In other countries, not only do the younger citizens learn, they make new things even more. Hence, as of today, all six-year-old boys and girls in Ethiopia should attend school. As for parents who would not send their children to school, when the former die, their wealth, instead of passing to children, will be transferred to the government. My government will prepare the schools and avail itself of the teachers.

The proclamation gave legitimacy through the force of law. First, the emperor wants to drive new change to the country via expanding education. Second was related to gender equality where the past traditional educational scheme excluded female students with large domain of males.

Overall, this was not achieved Menelik's goal. By the time of Menelik's death in 1913, there were three schools established in provincial center: in Harar, Dessie, and Ankober. Although the attendance was free in school, it was not attracted by people nor the youth, mainly due to influence of the clergy. Menelik II itself had problems in early history while embracing a more secular and modern system of education. By that time, there were 100 students enrolled in the school, mainly the sons of nobles of chiefs, and the nobles tended to tradition, and began to send the children of their servants or members of the extended family.

Later on, there was need for modern public education in the early beginning of the twentieth century, with absence of Church and Quran education to satisfy the demands or needs of political, economic, foreign relations, maintaining the sovereignty of the country. This was influenced by centralized government since the 19th century and Ethiopia's strong diplomatic ties with other world, the Franco-Ethiopian Railway and the introduction of infrastructure. European languages such as French, Italian, English as well as native language Amharic dominated the curriculum to the field like mathematics, science, physical training, and sports.

The main curriculum was brought from France, which routinely promoted the natives to learn French language and highly assimilated through the course. Menelik also faced opposition from church leaders in Coptic Orthodox at Alexandria and Syria for introducing modern type education, which believed to promote anti-Ethiopian attitude particularly for introducing foreign education. As response to opposition, the curriculum included Ge'ez course that included writing and reading.

By the 1920s, the opposition to modern education came to diminish slightly and Menelik contributed to the growth of non-governmental education. In 1929, Empress Zewditu issued a proclamation that wanted to reverse traditional education. It reads as:

Those parents who failed to send their children to schools and made them learn reading and writing skills, respecting the empress and God would have to be penalized 50, 50 Ethiopian birr each and the birr collected from such penalties would be given to the respective church and being used to serve the needy people. The baptism priest was also requested to advice his religious children to send their biological children to schools. If they failed to send their children to schools, the priest should inform this to the respective government representatives. The teachers are requested to teach children. Church leaders are also expected to provide life skills advice to its people. Moreover, parents need to initiate their children to learn local skills that could help them to lead their future.

== Haile Selassie regime ==
Since Emperor Haile Selassie came to power in 1916 and notably in 1930, modern education made hallmark in the Ethiopian history. The second government school was inaugurated named Teferi Mekonnen School and started modern education as of 1925. Like Menelik II, Haile Selassie faced opposition from conservatives while making efforts to open the school, and subsequently halted the project for a couple of years to overcome the opposition.

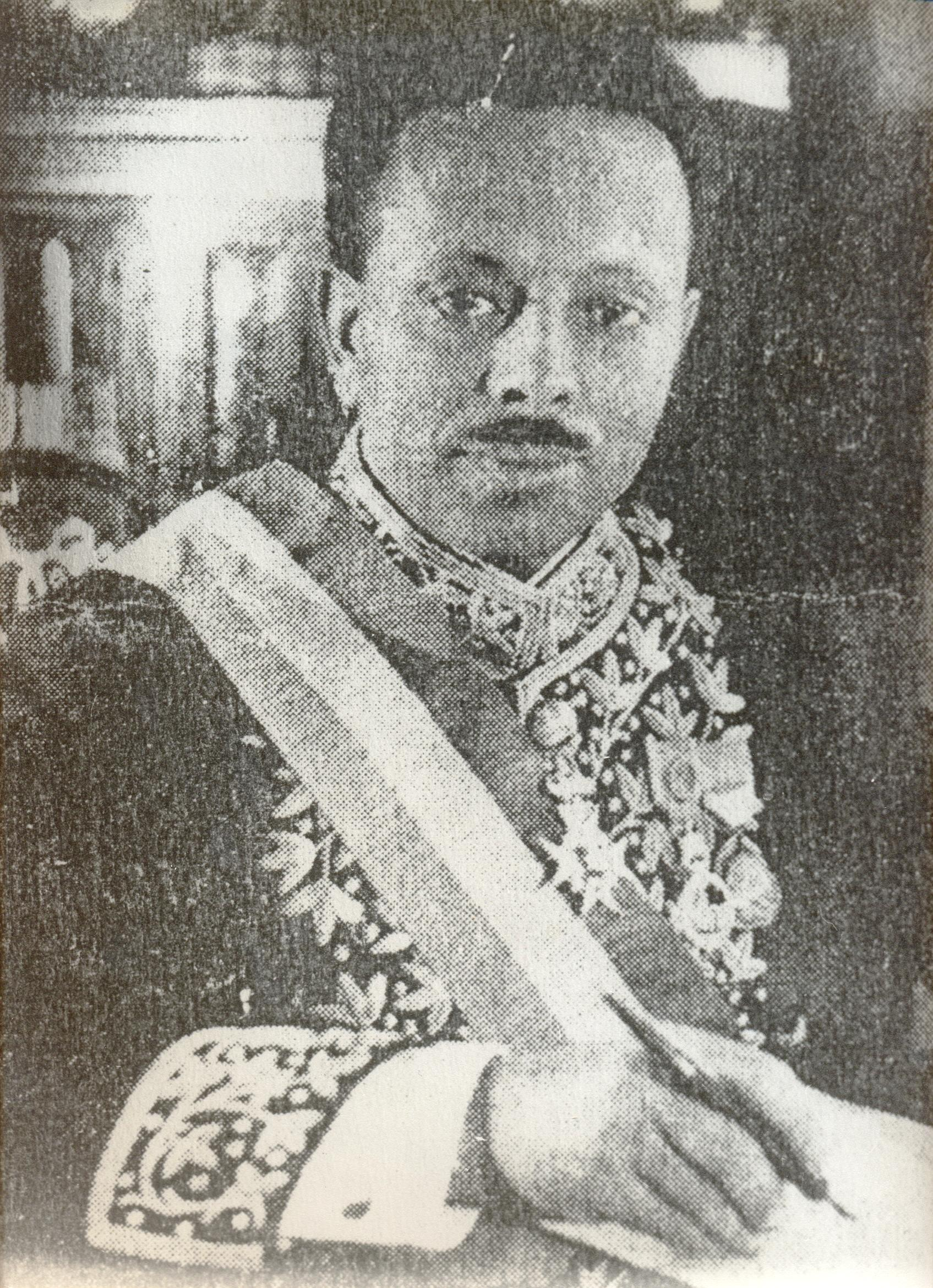
Blatangeta Lorenzo was prominent Eritrean-Ethiopian writer in the early part of the reign of Emperor Haile Selassie

There were to main streams of education, French and English, while French has dominated most of instruction. The curriculum was consisting of French, English and Arabic, mathematics, chemistry and physics, history, geography, gymnastics and sport, as well as Amharic. Most of teaching staffs consisted of expatriate teachers such as French and Lebanese while there were also Ethiopian teachers influencing teaching Amharic and elementary French. In 1930, Haile Selassie established the Ministry of Education assuming the crucial role of modern education. During this time, some steps were taken such as allocation of education budget and soldiers should learn writing and reading, and priests should convince themselves to engage tutor youths.

Agricultural education students

The American education advisor Ernest Work appointed and contrived education cycle consisting of 6 years of primary, 6 years of secondary, and 4 years of university education with high emphasis of teachers education/training and agriculture. From 1930 to 1935, provincial schools and community schools for children of foreigners, a teaching training, and Boy Scouts' school were opened. British-Ethiopian historian Richard Pankhurst noted that the literacy rate was elevated henceforth. During Italian occupation of Ethiopia (1936–1941), formal education was suspended until the state machinery could be reassembled and the school reopened.

Between 1944 and 1950, educational funded resources became scarce and the growth rate of education slowed down. During the post-liberation period, the British exerted to invest schools, and English became the main curricula for Ethiopian education. It resembled to East African British colonies by textbooks and students were prepared for the London General Certificate Examination (LGCE), which was functional to the Ethiopian education from 1947 to 1958.

== The Derg era ==
After the Derg came to power in 1974, educational system of Ethiopia merely consisted of socialist ideology and adopted as a new education policy. This view charted by the National Democratic Revolution (NDR) in 1976, further elaborated five volume policy documents known as General Directives of Ethiopian Education produced by the Ministry of Education in 1980. Another aim of education endorsed by the ruling party in 1984 as:

The aim of socialist education is to mold citizens who have an all-rounded personality by inculcating the entire society with socialist ideology, thus arming them with the required knowledge for socialist construction. The fundamental aim of education is...to cultivate Marxist-Leninist ideology in the young generation, to develop knowledge in science and technology, in the new culture and the arts, and to integrate and co-ordinate research with production to enable the revolution to move forward and secure productive citizens.

In July 1990, 75.3% national literacy rate was reported to the government with national campaign. The rate of expansion of both primary and secondary education was higher than to the previous Haile Selassie regime. Enrollment (including those in private schools) increased from 224,934 in 1959–1960 to 1,042,900 in 1974–1975 or the rate of about 15% per annum. During the period of 1975–1979, enrollment increased from 1,042,900 to 3,926,700 or at the rate of about 12% annually.

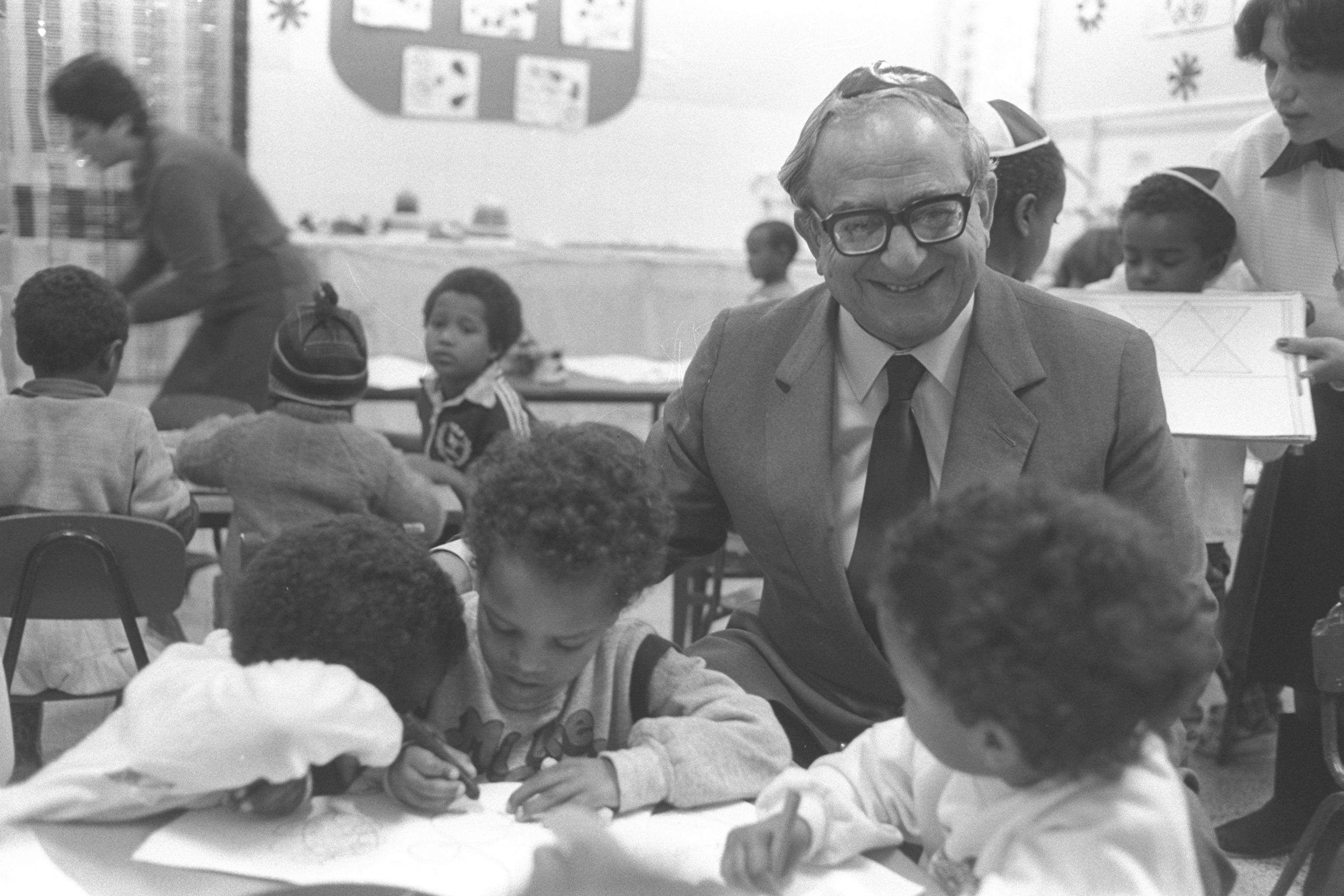
Ministry of Education and Culture Yitzhak Navon visiting a kindergarten class of young immigrants from Ethiopia in 1985

Despite significantly growing from the past, there were also problems with shortage of qualified teachers and resources, which resulted in the deterioration of quality of education. In 1983, the Derg adopted a resolution that reads as:

[t]he formal education sector expanded rapidly after the revolution, but the fact that there are some weaknesses in the quality of education must now be recognized. The content and quality of education must fully prepare students to meet the objective demands of the nation and the ideological needs of society. [S]teps should be taken without delay to implement the program for expansion of technical and vocational education in line with the manpower demands of the country.

In response to the resolution, the then Ministry of Education launched a project known as Evaluative Research on the General Education System of Ethiopia (hereafter ERGESE) in 1983, which was completed by 1986.

The Derg had received criticisms over the education system. For instance, various proposals were made to change the structure of educational system, but not implemented at all while most regular budget (56.8%) were allocated to the military and other activities at the expense of education and other social development issues and activities, and the literacy campaign which was launched in 15 national languages, did not adequately commit the desired goals. The other criticism associated with curriculum undertaking; few authors had study the curriculum affected transitional development.

== Sources ==
- Historical Upheavals of the Educational Policy Formulation and Implementation in Ethiopia: A Historical Analysis
