= Myrtle Baptist Church Neighborhood Historic District =

Historic district in Massachusetts, United States

- U.S. National Register of Historic Places
- U.S. Historic district
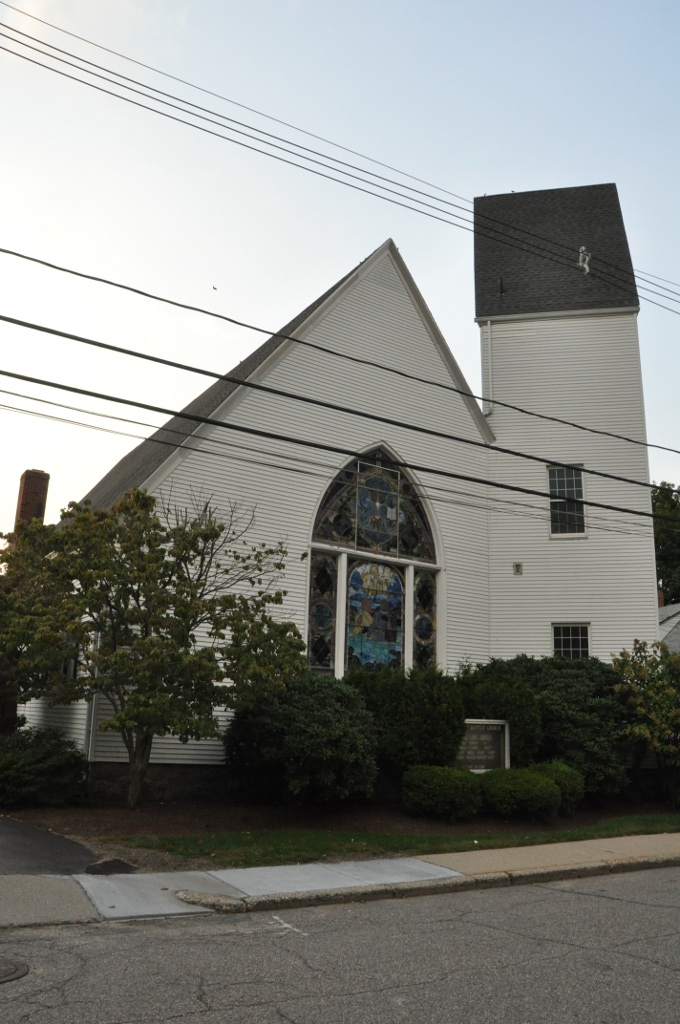
- The Myrtle Baptist Church on Curve St.

- Location within Massachusetts Location within the United States
- Location: Roughly Curve St. and Prospect St., Newton, Massachusetts
- Coordinates: 42°20′48″N 71°14′5″W
- Area: 6.5 acres (2.6 ha)
- Built: 1874
- Architect: Spence, George W.; McGraw, J.G.
- Architectural style: Italianate, Second Empire, Queen Anne
- MPS: Newton MRA (AD)
- NRHP reference No.: 08001178
- Added to NRHP: December 11, 2008

The Myrtle Baptist Church Neighborhood Historic District encompasses a historic center of the African-American community in West Newton, Massachusetts. The district includes all of Curve Street, where the Myrtle Baptist Church is located, as well as a few properties on adjacent Auburn and Prospect Streets. The district was listed on the National Register of Historic Places in 2008.

== Description and history ==
Curve Street, and adjacent areas that were razed to make way for the adjacent Massachusetts Turnpike, has been a center of Newton's African-American community since about 1870, and is the only such area to retain any sort of historic integrity in the city. The focus of the neighborhood became the Myrtle Baptist Church, a wood-frame structure built in 1875 and rebuilt in 1898 after a fire, and nearby railroad yards provided a source of jobs for laborers who lived in the neighborhood. Houses along densely packed Curve Street have in some cases remained in the ownership of the same families since the area was first settled.

The district contains one church, one commercial building, and twenty-two residential houses. Most of the houses were built between the 1880s and 1929, and are set on small relatively near the street. Most are single-family residences, although there is one large Second Empire house that has been converted to condominiums, and there are a few duplexes and one triple-decker. Stylistically they are diverse, typically done in vernacular versions of popular revival styles of the period. The most unusual house in the district is 15-29 Prospect Street, the converted Second Empire house, which was moved into the area sometime in the 19th century, and had been divided into apartments by the early 20th century. It retains many of its original architectural features, including a bracketed cornice, segmented-arch dormers in the mansard roof, and an elaborate cupola.

== See also ==
- National Register of Historic Places listings in Newton, Massachusetts
