= American Baptist College =

Private college in Nashville, Tennessee, U.S.

Coordinates: 36.202599°N 86.789891°W

- Motto: Light a Flame that lasts forever
- Type: private historically black college
- Established: 1924
- Religious affiliation: National Baptist Convention, USA, Inc.
- Endowment: $2.82 million (2025)
- President: Derrick Jackson
- Students: 48
- Location: Nashville, Tennessee, United States
- Campus: 53 acres (210,000 m^{2})
- Website: www.abcnash.edu

American Baptist College (previously American Baptist Theological Seminary) is a private, historically black Baptist college in Nashville, Tennessee, United States, affiliated with the National Baptist Convention, USA. The school was founded in 1924. Upon accreditation by the American Association of Bible Colleges in 1971, ABTS dropped use of the term "Theological Seminary" and renamed itself American Baptist College.

American Baptist Theological Seminary students and faculty played major roles in the Civil Rights Movement, especially in the Nashville Student Movement and 1960 Nashville sit-ins. John Lewis, Bernard Lafayette, James Bevel, C. T. Vivian, Kelly Miller Smith, William Barbee, Julius Scruggs, and John F. Grimmett were among the activists who played major roles.

== History ==
The school's Nashville predecessor in black Baptist education was Roger Williams University, a college that operated from 1866 to 1929, though it was not specifically aimed at the education of ministers.

The idea of a seminary for the training of Black Baptist ministers grew out of conversation between National Baptist leaders and O.L. Hailey about the possibility of establishing a seminary for the education of its ministers, in 1913. In a resolution presented by Edgar Young Mullins and adopted by the Southern Baptist Convention in that same year, the convention pledged its cooperation and appointed a similar committee. The committees of the two conventions met together and the following year recommended to their respective bodies that the college be established in Memphis, Tennessee. It was later decided to establish the College in Nashville. The present site of 53 acres was purchased with the help of the National Baptists in 1921, and a plan calling for the management of the seminary by a holding board and a governing board representative of the two conventions was adopted. The first building, Griggs Hall, was erected in 1923 and housed dormitory rooms, dining hall, library, and classrooms.

American Baptist College formally opened its doors for the training of Christian workers under the name of the American Baptist Theological Seminary on September 14, 1924. "The seminary opened Oct. 1, 1924, with an enrollment of 28 men and 2 women. The first faculty consisted of William T. Amiger, James Henry Garnett, and O. L. Hailey. Sutton E. Griggs was elected the first president."

In 1937, the Southern Baptist Convention agreed to share 50/50 with the National Baptist Convention, USA Inc. in the operation of the College. The unprecedented cooperation between the National Baptist Convention, USA Inc. and the Southern Baptist Convention created a unique educational opportunity for African American clergy to gain higher biblical and theological education for over five decades. Due to this partnership, the Southern Baptist Convention helped prepare students and a broad spectrum of church leaders who were ready to meet the challenges of the Civil Rights Movement led by Martin Luther King Jr. Providing scholarships and fiscal support of the operations of American Baptist College, the Southern Baptist Convention made a significant contribution to the education of men and women for Christian service in the world. In order to support the future growth and flourishing of the College, the Southern Baptist Convention continued in that partnership until a joint decision to turn over the assets to the Board of Trustees of American Baptist College in 1996.

The College has educated Civil Rights champions, national leaders and Christian ministers. The school's history during the 1960s and 1970s was filled with civil rights champions, national leaders and Christian ministers. Students from American Baptist College, such as Julius Scruggs, Bernard Lafayette, James Bevel, William Barbee and John Lewis served on the front line of the Nashville sit-ins for justice and change.

Under the tutelage of then-professors J.F. Grimmett, Kelly Miller Smith, and C.T. Vivian, many students sat down at local lunch counters to protest racial segregation. The campus itself was a popular command post for organizing and training students for social justice causes throughout the city at the time. A number of students from that period have gone on to become major names in civil rights history and American politics e.g., John Lewis, Bernard Lafayette, Julius Scruggs. At the time, members of the Nashville Student Movement referred to the college as the "Holy Hill".

In 1971, the school became accredited and its official name was changed to American Baptist College. The college was originally formed as a joint educational partnership between the Southern Baptist Convention and the National Baptist Convention, USA, Inc. The Southern Baptist Convention withdrew as one of the founding fathers of the college. At its annual meeting in 1993, the National Baptist Convention appointed a committee to investigate support of the college in 1995. The college continues to serve as the primary theological training center for the NBC, USA Inc.

In 2013, it received the federal designation as a historically Black college or university was awarded on March 20, 2013, by the U.S. Education Department.

=== Historic district ===
The American Baptist Theological Seminary Historic District was listed on the National Register of Historic Places in June 2013. The listing recognized the institution's significance for African American ethnic heritage, education, and religion, as well as its role in the Civil Rights movement of the mid-twentieth century. Contributing elements in the historic district include the historic plan and landscape of the campus at 1800 Baptist World Center Drive in Nashville, as well as three historic buildings: Griggs Hall (built in 1924), the J.B. Lawrence Administration Building (built in 1947), and the T.L. Holcomb Library (built in 1954).

== College facilities ==
=== T.L. Holcomb and Susie McClure Library ===
The T.L. Holcomb and Susie McClure library is a three-floor facility located in the center of campus. The library provides research and study areas, houses the ABC Chapel and a computer lab. The library collection contains more than 14,000+ volumes, over 200 periodicals, and a rare collection of Bibles in over 300 different languages. The collected writings of Mohandas "Mahatma" Gandhi can be found in the library's reading room. The library has also received donations from the private collections of Renita J. Weems, Harmon Wray, and Professor Janet Wolf. These donated books cover a variety of topics including ethics, politics, social justice, theology, and Christian leadership.

=== T.L. Holcomb Chapel ===
Chapel services are required and held weekly in the T.L. Holcomb Chapel. Every service involves students, staff, and faculty with occasional guest preachers, alumni, and scholars in residence. Chapel services are mandatory and held weekly on Tuesday from 5:30 pm to 6:30 pm. Vesper service is held weekly on Friday beginning at 6:45 pm (attendance not required).

=== J. H. Flakes and J. B. Lawrence Administration Building ===
The administration building was completed in 1946 and is named in honor of J.B. Lawrence, a former Secretary of the Southern Baptist Home Mission Board. In 2011, J. H. Flakes' name was added to the administration building in honor of his work and ministry on behalf of the college. This building houses administrative offices and classrooms.

=== Griggs Hall ===
Griggs Hall was the first building constructed on the campus in 1923. It was named to honor the legacy of the Griggs family: Sutton E. Griggs was the first president of American Baptist Theological Seminary (ABTS) and his father, A.R. Griggs, served as the secretary of the National Baptist Education Board. In 1948, a fifty-foot addition to the structure was completed. The school's first cafeteria was originally housed in the basement of the hall, along with modest laundry facilities. Currently, this building is undergoing renovation.

=== Baptist World Center ===
Dedicated in 1989, the Baptist World Center was constructed as the official international headquarters for the National Baptist Convention USA, Inc. It is the very first building of its kind erected by the convention. The Baptist World Center is located on the south edge of the campus, on the original site of the former National Baptist Missionary Training center. It houses administrative offices of the National Baptist Convention, USA, Inc. and is used by American Baptist College for classroom space, events, workshops, and the campus dining hall. The sanctuary is large enough to accommodate the Annual Mid-Winter Board Meeting of the National Baptist Convention USA, Inc., as well as annual lectures and major conferences and convocations of the college.

=== John R. Lewis and Julius R. Scruggs Leadership Development Center ===
The Lewis-Scruggs building was opened in 2005 and named in honor of two ABC alumni, Congressman John R. Lewis (D-GA) and Julius R. Scruggs, ABC Board Member and Vice President at Large, National Baptist Convention, USA, Incorporated. The Leadership Center is located behind the T.L. Holcomb Library and Susie McClure Library

=== Alumni Hall ===
Alumni Hall is a single-story structure that was named in honor of the college's alumni. The hall, located near student apartments on the north edge of campus, is used to house the department of Campus Operations.

== Student life ==
Undergraduate demographics as of Fall 2023
Race and ethnicity	Total
Black	96%
International student	4%
Economic diversity
Low-income (Note: The percentage of students who received an income-based federal Pell grant intended for low-income students.)	72%
Affluent (Note: The percentage of students who are a part of the American middle class at the bare minimum.)	28%

American Baptist College has a variety of organizations, committees, and activities.

=== Garnett-Nabrit Lectures ===
The Garnett-Nabrit Lectures (GNL) is an annual event held each spring to honor the legacy of James Henry Garnett, a former dean and acting president, and J. M. Nabrit, fourth President of the college. The lecture series, initiated in 1958, grew out of the annual Ministers and Missionary Conference that began in 1937. American Baptist College hosts this annual event on campus at the World Baptist Center. Religious scholars and preachers are selected to address issues relevant for service and leadership. The lecture series provides a forum for church leaders, as well as students, to listen to, interact with, and be inspired by noted scholars, pastors, and laypersons. The Garnett-Nabrit Lectures is the premier lecture series of the year held at American Baptist College. During the lecture series, alumni return to campus to take part in the tradition of academic enrichment. This time of homecoming allows former students to interconnect with current and prospective students providing a lasting heritage for American Baptist College. Attendance is highly recommended for all enrolled students.

=== Founders Day ===
Representatives of the National Baptist Convention, USA, Inc. and the Southern Baptist Convention founded the American Baptist Theological Seminary, now known as the American Baptist College, on May 6, 1924. The College observes this day annually with a special service commemorating the event. Generally, special pre-Founders Day activities are sponsored on campus throughout the week and a Founders Day Memorial Service for the community of American Baptist College including the Alumni Association.

=== Discovery Week ===
Discovery Week at American Baptist College is a campus wide engagement with the Nashville at large community and beyond and path seekers who desire vocational guidance for relevant spirituality, biblical studies, and theological education.

=== ABC Day ===
American Baptist College seeks to develop leaders who aspire to become prophetic in their preaching and teaching ministry. Therefore, ABC Day allows for the college to partner up with churches in various cities to provide opportunities for students to go and preach and represent the college as future leaders and preachers. ABC Day is often held in the Spring semester each academic year.

=== Student Government Association (SGA) ===
All students at American Baptist College carrying six hours or more are members of the Student Government Association (SGA). It is the purpose of SGA to promote the welfare of the student body and to maintain high standards of conduct for all students. Each spring the students elect a student council that supervises the student body. The president of the council serves as a liaison between the students and the administration. The SGA sponsors most of the campus-wide social events that are open to all students. These events include parties, game nights, banquets, and annual picnics. SGA Officers includes: President, Vice President, Secretary, Treasurer, Senior Class Representative, Junior Class Representative, Sophomore Class Representative, and Freshman Class Representative. A student must have a grade point average (GPA) of at least 2.5 to run for office and once elected must maintain a 2.5 GPA. Elections are held during the Spring semester of each school year.

=== Baptist Student Union ===
The Baptist Student Union (BSU) is a student ran organization that provides a venue for students to grow and fellowship with each other as they participate in the liturgy through: preaching, lecturing, and worship called Vesper. Vesper services are held every Friday at 7 pm. The Baptist Student Union of the National Baptist Convention USA, Inc was actually founded on the ABTS campus.

=== NAACP ===
NAACP Unit 5961 is the officially chartered NAACP college unit at American Baptist College. The unit provides a platform for students to engage in civil rights advocacy, leadership development, and community-based action in alignment with the mission of the National Association for the Advancement of Colored People. Open to all students, the unit organizes initiatives such as voter education and registration efforts, policy forums, economic and social justice programs, and community service projects. Its work centers on empowering the student body and addressing issues affecting Black communities in Nashville and across the country. The unit is led by a student executive board that includes roles such as President, Vice President, Secretary, Treasurer, and committee chairs. NAACP Unit 5961 collaborates closely with the college administration as well as state and national NAACP leadership to ensure that students remain informed, engaged, and supported in their advocacy efforts.

=== Greek organizations ===
Greek-letter organizations encourage high standards of scholarship, promote programs for cultural and social growth, and stress the spirit of Inter-Greek fellowship. They operate under charters granted by the college and their respective national bodies. Students are encouraged to see Student Services for complete list of sanctioned campus charters. Membership is open to male and female students above first-year classification. Students must meet the academic standards prescribed by the college (i.e., a cumulative average of 2.5 or better), as well as academic or other standards set by the several national bodies.

=== Honors Day ===
Honors day is held during the spring semester each school year for the purpose of recognizing distinctive achievement on the part of individual students.

=== Constitution Day ===
In compliance with the U.S. Education Department, Constitution Day is recognized as a National holiday at American Baptist College. Constitution Day shall be observed each year on September 17 in commemoration of the September 17, 1787, signing of the United States Constitution. If September 17 occurs on a non-school day, Constitution Day shall be conducted on the preceding Friday.

== Notable alumni ==
- LeRoy Bailey Jr., clergy, Senior Pastor of The First Cathedral
- James Bevel, civil rights leader
- R. E. Cooper, Sr., Baptist pastor and civil rights leader
- Cleavant Derricks, pastor, choir director, songwriter
- Leroy Gilbert, Chaplain of the United States Coast Guard
- Bernard Lafayette, civil rights activist, leader in the 1960s Civil Rights Movement and organizer; named first director of the Peace Education Program at Gustavus Adolphus College, St. Peter, Minnesota; recognized as one of the leading exponents of nonviolent direct action in the world and Distinguished Scholar-in-Residence at the Candler School of Theology at Emory University in Atlanta, Georgia.
- John Lewis, Georgia Congressman and leader of the Civil Rights Movement
- C.T. Vivian, author, minister, activist; served in Jesse Jackson's presidential campaign as the national deputy director for clergy
