= Imperium in Imperio =

1899 novel by Sutton E. Griggs

- Author: Sutton E. Griggs
- Language: English
- Genre: Historical Fiction, Political Fiction, social science fiction
- Published: 1899
- Publication place: United States of America

Imperium in Imperio is a historical fiction novel by Sutton E. Griggs, published in 1899. The novel covers the life of Belton Piedmont, an educated and disciplined Black man in the Jim Crow south and his role in a shadow government of Black men operated out of a college in Waco, Texas. Imperium in Imperio explores themes of Black imperialism and race conservation. It is Griggs' first and most notable novel and his only work currently in print.

== Plot ==
Belton Piedmont is born to a poor but hardworking family in Virginia and grows up intimately familiar with racism and segregation. He attends school with a mixed-race child, Bernard Belgrave, with whom he builds a rivalry and friendship. Belton and Bernard's educations take radically different turns when Bernard goes to Harvard while Belton is too poor to attend a prestigious university.

Belton's graduation speech is published in a Richmond newspaper and it catches the attention of a southern democrat, Mr. V.M. King, who vehemently opposes lynching. King takes a liking to Belton and gives him a check that will take him through college, but not before giving Belton some sage advice.

With King's aid, Belton attends a college in Nashville, Tennessee. Belton is perturbed when he discovers that even in the seemingly egalitarian school, there are Black professors who are silently ostracized and barred from eating meals with their White counterparts. Belton organizes a movement of civil disobedience and daunts the school's president into changing things.

After Belton graduates, he is harassed by a mob after encouraging Black men to vote. The mob goes to lynch him, even shooting him in the head, but the bullet is caught in Belton's skin and only leaves him unconscious. He's claimed by a doctor who wishes to dissect his body, but Belton awakens on the table and kills the doctor in self-defense. Belton flees and is eventually arrested for murder. The trial goes poorly when many of the jurors are from the mob that lynched him. But Belton's case reaches the attention of Bernard who uses his political connections to appeal Belton's verdict.

Belton later contacts Bernard asking him to come to Waco, Texas without any more explanation. Bernard agrees to come to his friend. Belton reveals the existence of the Imperium in Imperio, a shadow state consisting of Black men aiming to counteract segregation and to protect Black people in the South from persecution and violence. Belton and others in the Imperium believe that Bernard could be their George Washington.

Bernard is eventually elected president of the Imperium and they concoct a plan to infiltrate the United States Navy and use it to protect a new nation they plan to form in the heart of Texas. Belton opposes this plan, still holding onto his belief in the United States and that it would be wrong to betray the nation. He remains committed to the goal of improving the states rather than seceding and tenders his resignation from the Imperium, knowing full well that he'll be executed by his peers for attempting to leave. The members of the Imperium attempt to allow Belton to escape his sentence, but Belton refuses. Bernard and the Imperium execute Belton for his treason.

The novel opens with a confession from Berl Trout, a member of the Imperium who declares himself a traitor to his race, and an explication of the events surrounding Belton and the Imperium. After Belton's death, Trout writes that he was moved by Belton's convictions and betrays the Imperium, revealing its existence to the world and leaving it to the audience to judge the novel's events.

== Characters ==
- Belton Piedmont – An educated Black man and member of the Imperium. Belton is acutely aware of racial discrimination for the whole of his life, but ultimately chooses to pursue integration and advocates peace. He is modeled on Booker T. Washington.
- Bernard Belgrave – A schoolmate of Belton's and member of the Imperium. Contrasting with Belton, Bernard is much more militant and strongly advocates a military takeover of Texas.
- Berl Trout – The secretary of the Imperium. Berl betrays the Imperium by exposing the organization's plans. Although he acknowledges his treachery towards his race, he reconciles with it, believing his actions are for the good of the human race as a whole
- Hannah Piedmont – Hannah Piedmont is Belton's mother, a poor but hardworking woman. Abandoned by her husband and left to care for five children, Hannah made sure her children got an education.
- Fairfax Belgrave – Fairfax Belgrave is Bernard's mother, described as a stunning and mysterious woman. It is later revealed that she had Bernard with a famous White senator, and to preserve his image, left with her son and kept it a secret from all.
- Mr. Tiberius Gracchus Leonard – Mr. Leonard is Belton and Bernard's schoolteacher. He was openly racist and biased against Belton while making sure Bernard had every advantage to prosper. It is later revealed that Mr. Leonard was hired by Bernard's father to ensure his academic success.
- Mr. V.M. King – Mr. King is the chief editor of the Richmond Daily Temps. As an avid supporter of Black American constitutional rights, Mr. King was moved by Belton's high school graduation speech and decides to pay for his college degree.
- Viola Martin – Viola is an incredibly beautiful and intelligent woman well regarded in the Norfolk community. She and Bernard fell in love, but despite her love for him, she was staunchly against interracial marriage and believed it tainted the Negro race. Once he asked for her hand in marriage, she committed suicide.
- Antoinette Nermal – Antoinette is a beautiful and intelligent school teacher who caught the eye of Belton. The two fell in love and got married, but due to the heavy discrimination Belton faced, he struggled to find a job to support them. Antoinette eventually had a baby, and when Belton saw that the child was White despite his dark skin and Antoinette's brown skin, he left her.
- Dr. Zackland – Dr. Zackland is a racist doctor who sets his eyes on obtaining Belton's body for dissection. He coordinates with a society known as the 'Nigger Rulers' to have him killed for this purpose.

== Themes ==
=== Black Imperialism ===
Imperium in Imperio was written during a period when America subscribed to an imperialist agenda and actively sought an empire overseas. Many African American authors used this time of U.S. expansion to open conversations about Jim Crow and the discrimination Black people faced. Sutton E. Griggs in particular used his work to speak directly to Black Americans, in contrast to his more mainstream counterparts. For example, a central focus of Imperium is the idea of a mass migration of Black Americans to Texas, followed by a political takeover of the state. This, coupled with Texas' rich history of acquisition, allows for a direct parallel between Black Americans expanding their home empire at the same time the U.S. expands overseas. The novel further demonstrates this through Belton's and Bernard's opposing viewpoints. Belton proposes that the Imperium should still remain as a part of the U.S. while still running independent operations, while Bernard advocates for an all-out race war so that African Americans secede completely to build their own empire.

=== Race Conservation ===
A key turning point in Imperium in Imperio is the suicide of Bernard's love interest, Viola. She kills herself following his marriage proposal, claiming that race mixing was causing the extermination of the Negro race. During her life, Viola made efforts to dissuade her peers to not date outside of the race, and as a dying plea, she begs Bernard to uphold her convictions.

While Viola attempted to solve the issue of miscegenation by working through individuals, Bernard sought to do so on a community-wide scale. He believed that in the Imperium's fight for sovereignty over Texas, the impending race war would also serve to effectively limit race mixing and thus further uplift the Black race. This serves as another contrast to Belton, who believed that the Imperium could function in tandem with the U.S. rather than taking power through violent means.

== Imperium in Imperio and Afrofuturism ==
Imperium in Imperio is considered to be a key precursor to Afrofuturism. The novel's depiction of a budding revolution and the formation of a Black utopia puts it amongst the first in the genre. An important feature of Afrofuturistic works is the literary blending of the past and future. Melissa A. Wright, in the Journal of Black Studies, analyzes that Imperium in Imperio's Black secret society "presents a suspended space time in which innovative alternatives to governance including wealth redistribution, can be imagined in the controlled environment of the narrative laboratory."

== Publishing ==
Imperium in Imperio was originally published by the Editor Publishing Company and sold door-to-door, and didn't see much popularity in its printing life.

== Reception ==
The book was one of few novels written around 1900 that had all Black major characters, and was "virtually unknown to white Americans". William Loren Katz, writing in the Journal of Black Studies, concluded that, although the book had "implausible and transparent characters and plot," and Griggs had "meager talents as a writer and lack of political sophistication and depth," he still "managed to capture a neglected but crucial moment and mood in the history of black America." The book was, according to Jack M. Beckham II "a relatively obscure work that has been almost completely ignored by critics." However, following a republication by the West Virginia University Press in 2003, the book has been the subject of numerous studies, for instance on its portrayal of: "oratory, embodiment, and US citizenship", collective efficiency, the middle way in the National Baptist Convention, utopia, and Black Baptist radicalism. Oxford Reference names the novel as "one of the most important novels of literary black nationalism."
