= Sutton E. Griggs =

American novelist (1872–1933)

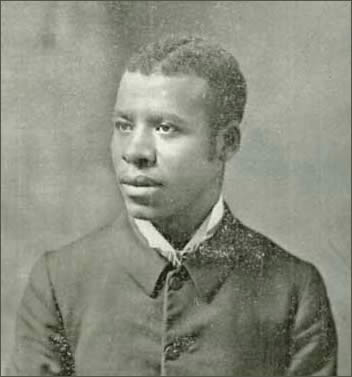
- Portrait of Sutton E. Griggs published in 1901

2nd President of American Baptist Theological Seminary
- In office 1925–1926
- Preceded by: William Thomas Amiger, as acting president
- Succeeded by: William Thomas Amiger

Personal details
- Born: June 19, 1872 Chatfield, Texas, United States
- Died: January 2, 1933 (aged 60) Houston, Texas, United States
- Spouse: Emma Williams (m. 1897–)
- Relations: Allen R. Griggs (father), Emma Hodge Griggs (mother), Eunice Griggs (daughter)
- Education: Bishop College, Richmond Theological Seminary
- Occupation: Novelist; minister; theologian; academic administrator; educator; publisher

Sutton Elbert Griggs (June 19, 1872 – January 2, 1933) was an American author, Baptist minister, academic administrator, educator, publisher, and social activist. He is best known for his novel Imperium in Imperio (1899), a utopian work that envisions a separate African-American state within the United States. Griggs was African-American, and known for African American literature, and western fiction and wrote on social justice, racial segregation and integration. He served as president of American Baptist Theological Seminary (now American Baptist College).

== Biography ==
=== Early years ===
Griggs was born Elbert Sutton Griggs (he later changed the order of his given names) in 1872 in Chatfield, Texas, to the Rev. Allen R. and Emma Hodge Griggs, the second of eight children. His grandfather was born free in Africa before transport to America as an enslaved man. His father, a former Georgia slave, became a prominent Baptist minister and founder of the first black high school in Texas. Sutton worked closely with his father on the National Baptist Convention's Education Committee. He wrote frequently later in life of his deep respect for his parents' characters and accomplishments.

Sutton Griggs attended Bishop College in Marshall, Texas and Richmond Theological Seminary. Upon graduation, he became pastor of the First Baptist Church in Berkley, Virginia. There he married Emma Williams, a teacher, in 1897. In 1899, he became pastor of Tabernacle Baptist Church in East Nashville and corresponding secretary of the National Baptist Convention. From 1894 to 1898, Griggs served as co-founder and publisher of the Virginia Baptist newspaper.

=== Career ===
Griggs was a prolific author, writing more than thirty books and pamphlets in his lifetime and selling them door-to-door or at the revival meetings at which he preached. His first novel, Imperium in Imperio, published in 1899, is his most famous. In 1901, Griggs founded the Orion Publishing Company to sell books to the African American market. None of his four subsequent novels achieved the success of Imperium in Imperio, but he produced a steady stream of social and religious tracts, as well as an autobiography.

An admirer of W. E. B. Du Bois and a supporter of the Niagara Movement and the National Association for the Advancement of Colored People, Griggs was strongly influenced by contemporary social theory. He believed that the practice of social virtues alone could advance a culture and lead to economic success. The more radical ideas expressed in his novels, particularly Imperium in Imperio, have led him to be sometimes characterized as a militant separatist in the mold of Marcus Garvey. During his lifetime, however, his integrationist philosophy and courting of white philanthropy earned him the scorn of self-help advocates. His 1923 nonfiction book Guide to Racial Greatness; or The Science of Collective Efficiency advocated for racial uplift through collective efficiency.

Griggs's careers in both the church and social welfare sphere were active and itinerant. In Houston, he helped establish the National Civil and Religious Institute. In 1914, he founded the National Public Welfare League. From 1925 to 1926, he served as president of the American Baptist Theological Seminary (now American Baptist College) in Nashville, which his father helped found. His longest tenure—19 years as pastor of Tabernacle Baptist Church in Memphis—saw him act on his belief in the social mission of churches, providing the only swimming pool and gymnasium then available to African Americans in the city.

=== Death and legacy ===
The Wall Street crash of 1929 stripped the Tabernacle of investment funds and led to its bankruptcy. Griggs returned to Hopewell Baptist Church in Denison, Texas, then to a brief pastorship in Houston. Shortly after resigning that post in 1933, he died in Houston, and was buried in Dallas.

== Griggs as an author ==
Title page of the first edition of Imperium in Imperio

Griggs's first novel follows a familiar formula: two childhood friends are separated by wealth, education, skin tone, and political outlook; one is a militant and one an integrationist. A traumatic incident galvanizes the more moderate friend into action, and the two work together to redress the injustice.

Imperium in Imperio (1899) follows this plotline with a startling twist: the revelation of an African American "empire within an empire," a shadow government complete with a Congress based in Waco, Texas. The light-skinned and more militant Bernard Belgrave who has been hand-picked to serve as president advocates a takeover of the Texas state government, while the dark-skinned Belton Piedmont argues for assimilation and cooperation. Bernard reluctantly has Belton executed as a traitor only after Belton resigns from the Imperium (an act that is tantamount to suicide), leaving the potentially violent and unstable Bernard in control of the Imperium as the novel ends.

The Hindered Hand, written in 1905 as a direct reply to Thomas Dixon's The Leopard's Spots, contains graphic accounts of sexual violence and lynching, and was among the most popular African-American novels of the period. In the novel's third edition, Griggs published a supplement entitled "A Hindering Hand: The Poor White and the Negro" which further criticized Dixon for instilling racism among poor whites against African Americans.

With a stiff prose style and long rhetorical passages punctuated by melodramatic events, Griggs' novels are not models of "literary" styling. However, for the African-American audiences for which they were written, the novels provided a rare opportunity to read about the political and social issues that preoccupied them, including violence, racism, and the pursuit of political and economic justice. At the time of his death, his works had been largely forgotten in wider literary circles.

Cover of The Hindered Hand, or, The Reign of the Repressionist

Although he outsold more famous contemporaries, Griggs remained largely invisible in literary histories of the time. A re-issue of Imperium by the Arno Press in 1969 revived interest in Griggs, and the West Virginia University Press has since republished all five of his novels. Imperium has been embraced as an important addition to the history of utopian literature, western fiction, and African-American literature.

== Works ==
- Imperium in Imperio: A Study of the Negro Race Problem: A Novel. 1899. – HTML full text.
- Overshadowed: A Novel. Nashville, TN: Orion Publishing Co., 1901.
- Unfettered: A Novel. Nashville, TN: Orion Publishing Co., 1902.
- The Hindered Hand; or, The Reign of the Repressionist. Nashville, TN: Orion Publishing Co., 1905.
- The One Great Question: A Study of Southern Conditions at Close Range. Philadelphia, PA: Orion Publishing Co., 1907.
- Pointing the Way. Nashville, TN: Orion Publishing Co., 1908.
- Needs of the South. Nashville, TN: Orion Publishing Co., 1909.
- Wisdom's Call. Memphis, TN: National Sentiment Moulding Bureau, 1911.
- The Story of My Struggles. Memphis, TN: National Public Welfare League, 1914.
- How to Rise. Memphis, TN: National Public Welfare League, 1915.
- Life's Demands; or, According to Law. Memphis, TN: National Public Welfare League, n.d. [c. 1916].
- Building Our Own: A Plea for a Parallel Civilization: An address by Sutton E. Griggs. Memphis, TN: National Sentiment Moulding Bureau, n.d. [1920s].
- Light on Racial Issues. Memphis, TN: National Public Welfare League, n.d. [c. 1921].
- Meeting the Great Test: Constructive Criticism of the Negro Race. Memphis, TN: National Public Welfare League, 1922.
- Guide to Racial Greatness; or, The Science of Collective Efficiency. Memphis, TN: National Public Welfare League, 1923.
- Kingdom Builders' Manual: Companion Book to Guide to Racial Greatness. Memphis, TN: National Public Welfare League, 1924.
- Triumph of the Simple Virtues; or, The Life Story of John L. Webb. Hot Springs, AR: Messenger Publishing Co., 1926.
- The Winning Policy. Memphis, TN: National Public Welfare League, 1927.
- Basis of Hope for the Negro in the South. Memphis, TN: National Public Welfare League, 1929.
- Plan for Solving the Race Problem. Memphis, TN: National Public Welfare League, 1929.
- Proper Approach to the Race Question in the South. Memphis, TN: National Public Welfare League, 1929.
- The Nation's New Policy Toward the Negro. Memphis, TN: National Public Welfare League, n.d. [1920s].
- Friction Between the Races: Causes and Cure. Memphis, TN: National Public Welfare League, n.d. [1920s].
- Why the Nation Does Not Handle the Race Question. Memphis, TN: National Public Welfare League, n.d. [1920s].
