= Menelik II School =

School in Addis Ababa, Ethiopia

Coordinates: 9.0352°N 38.7635°E

- ዳግማዊ ምኒሊክ ትምህርት ቤት
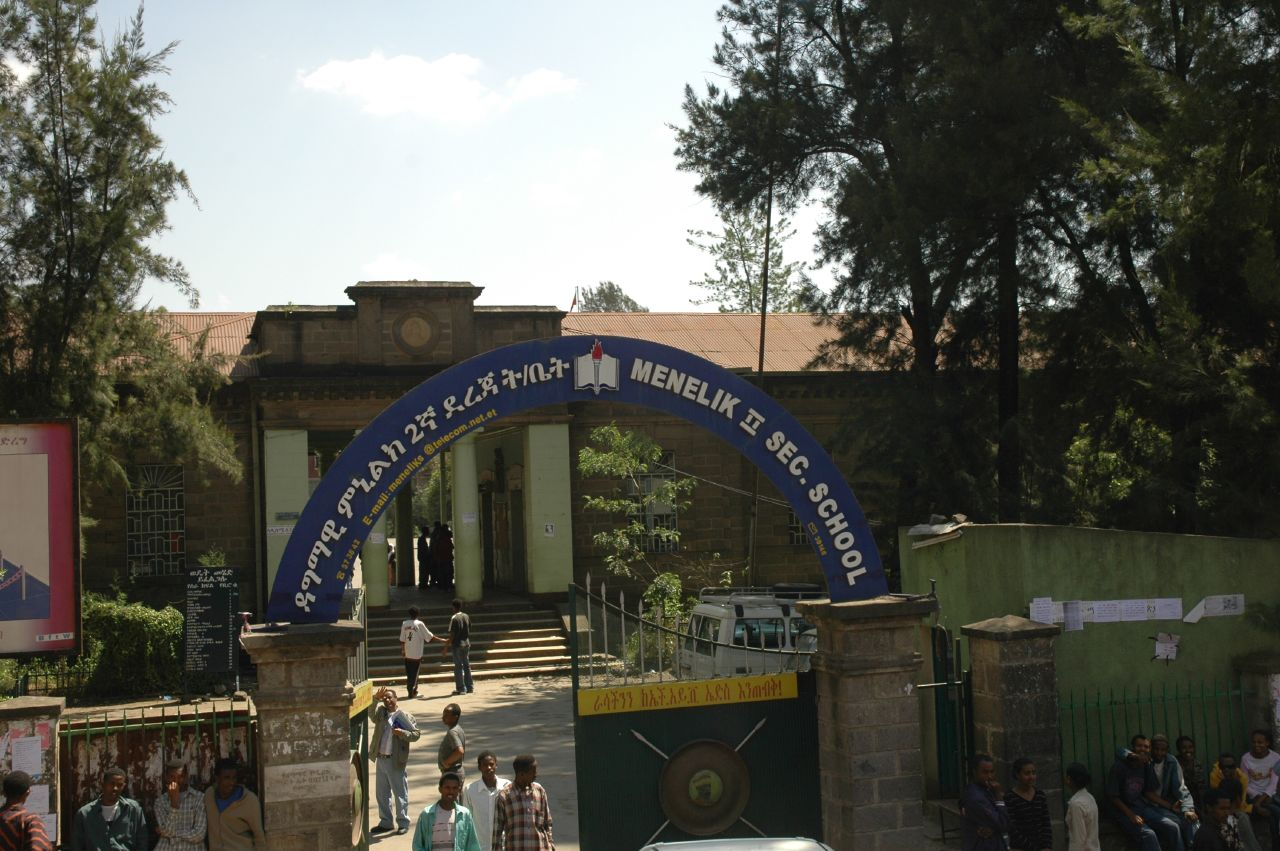
- Secondary school
- Arat Kilo, Addis Ababa; Ethiopia

Information
- Type: Basic education institution
- Established: October 1908
- Founder: Menelik II
- Enrollment: 2,000 students (Primary); 7,000 students (High school)

Menelik II School (Amharic: ዳግማዊ ምኒሊክ ትምህርት ቤት) comprises primary (elementary) and secondary (high school) institutions. The primary school was established in 1908 by the order of Emperor Menelik II, being the first modern school and pioneer for modern education in Ethiopia. The schools are located in Arat Kilo in Addis Ababa. The primary and secondary schools have over 2,000 and 7,000 students respectively.

== History ==
The school eponymously founded by Emperor Menelik II in October 1908 as a modern school, under guidance of Egyptian educator Hana Salib and a number of Coptic teachers. Hence, this was an initial period for modern Ethiopian education. It was designed by Greek engineers and architects. Before the establishment, Menelik issued proclamation in 1906 that gave legitimacy of modern education.

The earlier phase of school would face more secular and modern forms. The student population estimated around 100, nearly sons of nobles. However, the noble did not want to depart from traditional sense and began to send children of their servants or members of the extended family. Despite their traditional interests, they strongly encouraged influential educated elites to promote development. Menelik also faced opposition from Coptic Church of Alexandria and Syria for emphasizing worldy affairs. The school was temporarily closed by Italian invasion of Ethiopia from 1935 to 1941. Afterward, the school increased the grade level into 5th by 1942.

== Primary school ==
Menelik Primary School is located in Arat Kilo to Ferensai, and close to Testing Agency. The school began with 20 elite schoolchildren, but now can receive over 2,000 students, who came from poor families. However, many children begin much later, so that the age of fifth-grade students can range anywhere from 11–23 years of age. The average class size is 40 students.

The school suffered from decline of enrollment rate to transfer the High School: 2,000 students approximately 60% of them are working with minor jobs such as shoeshiners. However, they are technically supportive in finance to their families with their income. In addition, lack of basic infrastructure caused schoolchildren discomfort. The schoolyard remained unmaintained filled with dust, during rainfall, it inundated with water that is much difficult for sporting. Children also discontented with dining places with poor management and most prefer not to bring lunchbox at school.

== Secondary school ==
The secondary school is located in King George VI St, Arat Kilo in Addis Ababa next to Addis Ababa University. The school seizes an area of 500,000 square kilometers. The school has 7,000 students however 27 students were tending the garden which has existed for many years in a negligent state. 3,800 are evening students with classroom from initial 5 or 6 to 48. There are 144 Ethiopian and 16 foreign expatriate teachers in the school.
