= Higher education in Ethiopia =

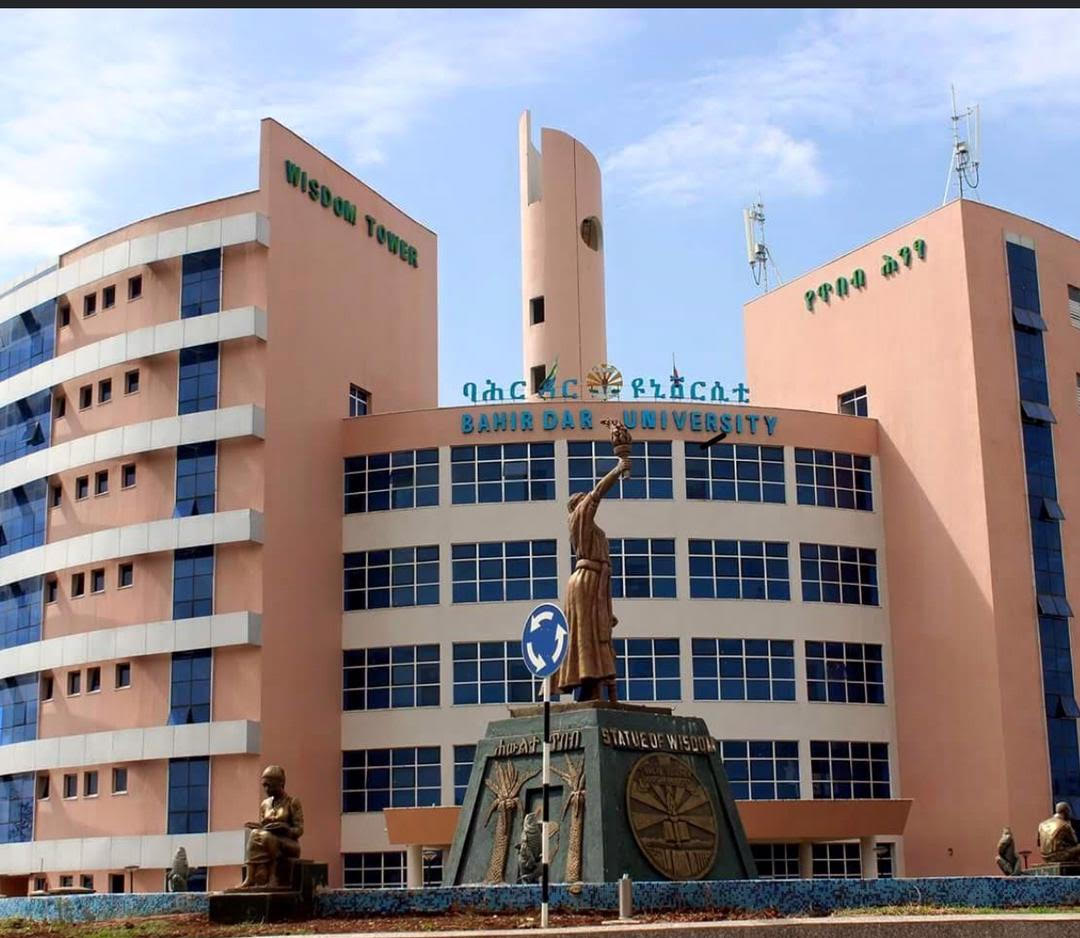
Bahir Dar University in Bahir Dar

Higher education in Ethiopia has been improving in quality, standard, relevance, and academic freedom. Despite an expansion of private higher education and rising enrollment, the quality of education they render is still under question. Higher education supposed originated by Saint Yared music school in the sixth century in line with centuries old traditional education of the Ethiopian Orthodox Tewahedo Church. Modern higher education was commenced during the reign of Emperor Haile Selassie with the establishment of the University College of Addis Ababa, now called Addis Ababa University, in 1950. It then followed by Haramaya University and Ambo school of agriculture, today's Ambo University. By this time, there were only three secondary schools in the country, used as preparatory for college entrance.

The earlier educational system of imperial regime was based on European style facilities implemented: Arts, Sciences and Education, includes thirteen departments, seven in Arts (Humanities, Social and Political Science, Geography, English, Economics, Public Administration and Commence), and six in Science (Chemistry, Physics, Mathematics, Geography, Biology and Pharmacy). Graduate level was introduced by 1979 followed by Alemaya University in 1984 and numerous public universities ensued.

Reforms on higher education were made since the regime of EPRDF in 1994. As of 2022, there are 83 universities, 42 public universities, and more than 35 higher education institutions. Foreign students constitute 16,305 in higher education level.

== History ==
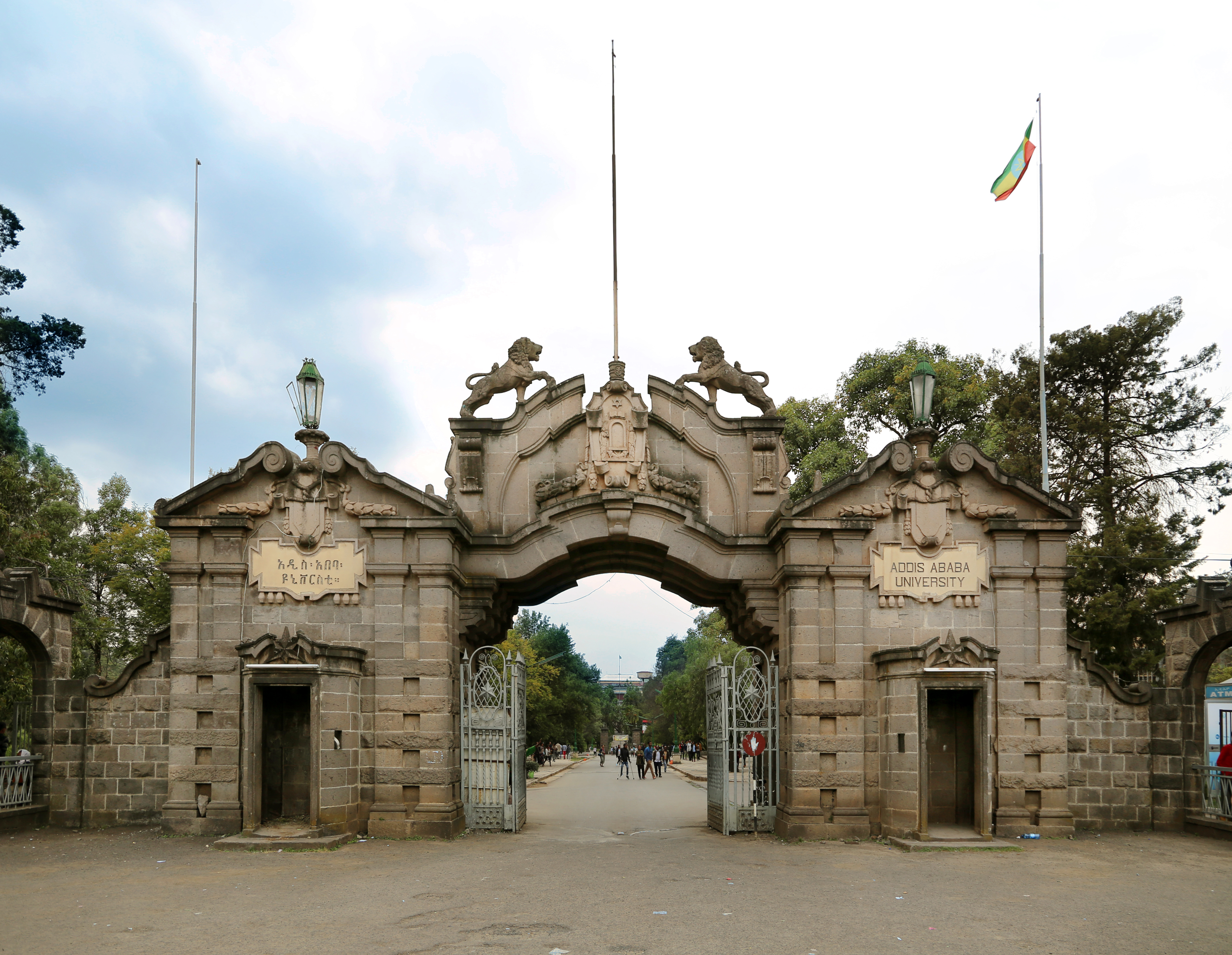
Addis Ababa University, the first higher education institution opened in Ethiopia in 1950

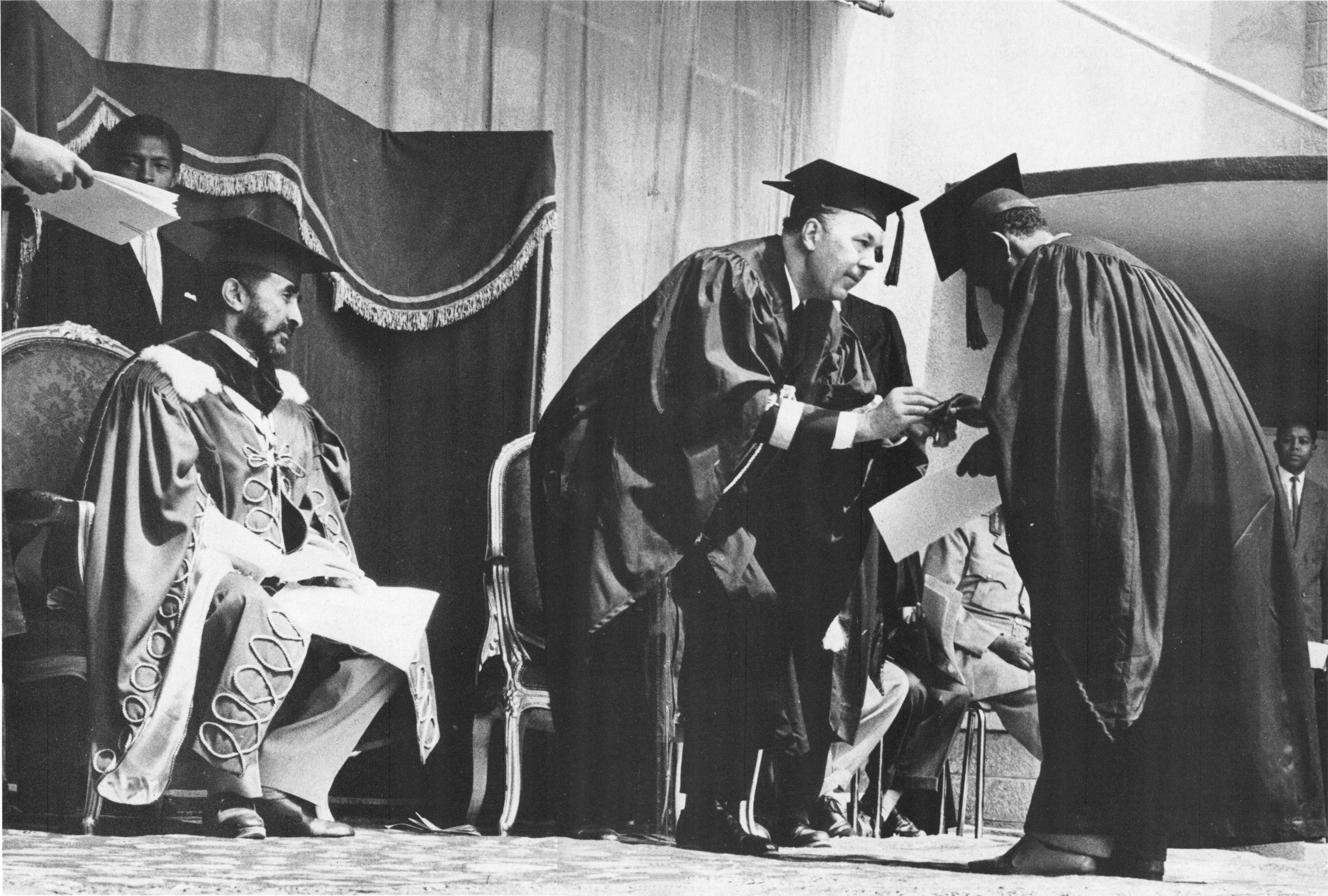
Prince Bertil, Duke of Halland awards diplomas in the presence of Emperor Haile Selassie at Swedish-Ethiopian Building College's graduation in 1959.

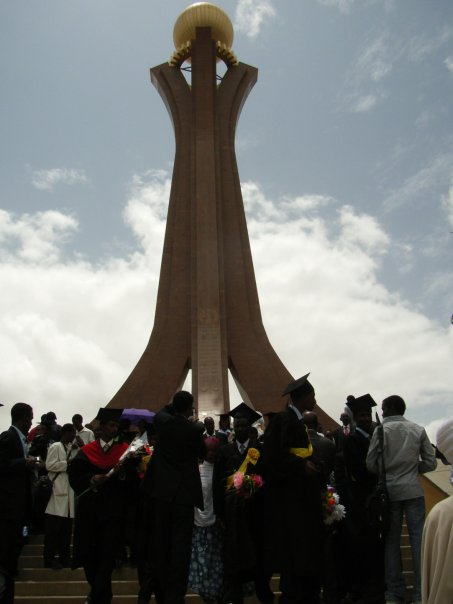
Graduate students in front of TPLF monument in Mekelle

Higher education in Ethiopia traced back to the origin of the Ethiopian Orthodox Tewahedo Church, based on monastic institutions. In the sixth century, Saint Yared formed his music school that trained qualified priests in the religious music and dance characterized their faith. This system evolved throughout millennia until the mid-20th century modernization of Emperor Haile Selassie. In July 1950, Haile Selassie pledged Jesuit Canadian teachers for establishment of college in the country. The University College of Addis Ababa, now called the Addis Ababa University (AAU) then formed in the year. As a college, the institution intended to prepare students for "further overseas study or vocational certificate education". By foreign investment fund, six specialized technical colleges had been established since 1970s by the imperial government. The first university outside AAU is Haramaya University, founded in 1953. By the time, there were only three secondary schools in the country, used for preparatory to college entrance. European-styled education system implemented with separated facilities of Arts, Sciences, and Education, includes thirteen departments: seven in Arts (Humanities, Social and Political Science, Geography, English, Economics, Public Administration and Commence), and six in Science (Chemistry, Physics, Mathematics, Geology, Biology and Pharmacy).

Graduate level training began in Addis Ababa University in 1979, followed by Alemaya University in 1984. Later Wondo Genet College of Forestry trained undergraduate through forestry programs. Jimma, Hawassa and Mekelle University later continued the training process to graduate students. After the abolishing of imperial government in 1974, the military regime under the Derg expanded the higher education system based on communist Marxist-Leninist framework, having strong security surveillance, repression of dissents, and prohibition of student organizations. After the fall of the Derg in 1991, the new EPRDF led government undertook market reform in the higher educational system. Nevertheless, by the end of 20th-century, the higher education system was based on highly regimented management, conservative intellectual orientation, limited autonomy and few academic staff with doctorates, declining the educational quality and weak research output and poor connection with global higher education.

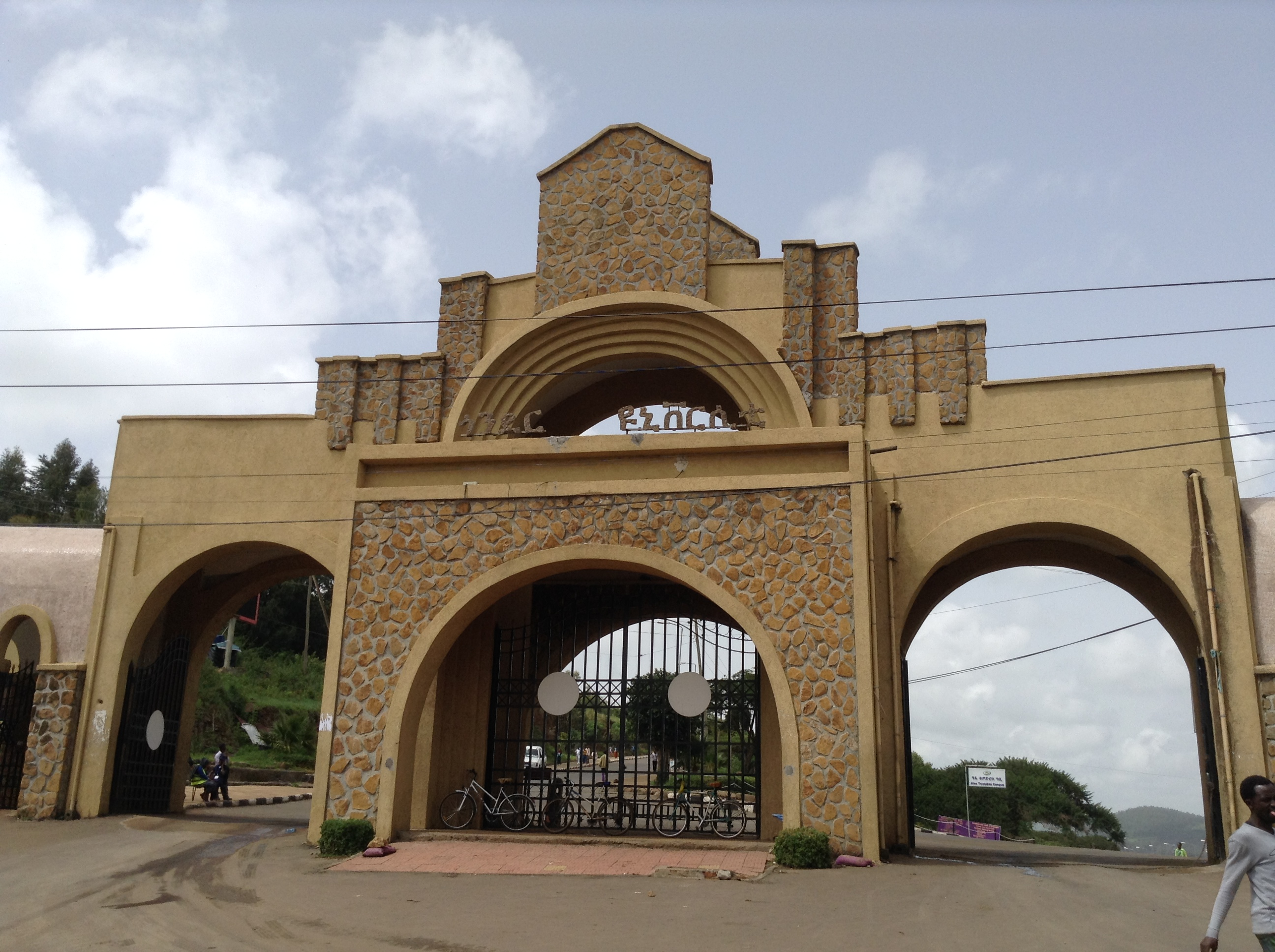
University of Gondar

Between 1996 and 2003, annual graduate students intake grew about 9,000 to over 18,000 by the Ministry of Education sponsored institution. The enrollment of graduate programs has increased from 200 to 2,000.

=== Reform agenda ===
The Ethiopian education currently focused on reforms in three levels: the overall system, the institutions, and the academic programs. The reforms began in 1960s, repressed in 1970s and reinstated in 1994. As of 2025, there are 46 total universities: of 8 research universities, 17 universities of applied sciences, and 21 public universities. Additionally, the private sector has established 659 colleges of private higher education and 5 private universities.

== List of facilities ==
=== Universities ===
- Addis Ababa University
- Addis Ababa Science and Technology University
- Adigrat University
- Ambo University
- Haramaya University
- Bahir Dar University
- Jimma University
- Mekelle University
- Jijiga University
- Hawassa University
- Arba Minch University
- Debre Markos University
- University of Gondar
- Dire Dawa University
- Madda Walabu University
- Adama Science And Technology University
- Debre Birhan University
- Mizan–Tepi University
- Wolaita Sodo University
- Debre Birhan University

=== Private universities ===
- St. Mary's University
- Unity University
- Rift Valley University
- Ethiopian Civil Service University
- Admas University
- St. Lideta Health Science clCollege
- Negele Arsi General Hospital and Medical College

=== Colleges ===
- Hamlin College of Midwifery
- Harambe College
- Harar Agrotechnical University
- Naath Unity University
- Ayer Tena Health Science College
- Blue Nile College
- Hawassa Health Science College
- Yardsticks International College
- Baro Gambella College
- Universal Medical College
