= List of universities and colleges in Ethiopia =

This is a list of universities and colleges in Ethiopia. It includes both public and private institutions.

There are 5 private universities and 659 private colleges of higher education in Ethiopia. Public higher education institutions are categorized by the Ministry of Education (MOE) into four main focus areas:

- 8 are classified as research universities.
- 17 are classified as applied sciences universities.
- 21 are classified as general (comprehensive) universities.
- 3 are classified as specialised universities.

== Universities and colleges ==
Name	Location	Region	Established	Notes
Adama University	Adama	Oromia	1993	Science And Technology. Formerly called, Adama University, Nazret College of Technical Teachers Education preceding Nazret Technical College.
Addis Ababa Commercial College	Addis Ababa	Addis Ababa	1943	Since 2001 it is part of Addis Ababa University.
Addis Ababa Science and Technology University	Addis Ababa	Addis Ababa	2011	Sciences and engineering
Addis Ababa University	Addis Ababa	Addis Ababa	1950	Founded as University College of Addis Ababa; between 1962 and 1975 named Haile Selassie University
Addis Continental Institute of Public Health	Addis Ababa	Addis Ababa	2006	
Adigrat University	Adigrat	Tigray	2011	
Admas University College	Addis Ababa	Addis Ababa	1998	Gambella University .. Gambella Region
ALKAN Health Science Business and Technology College	Addis Ababa	Addis Ababa	2002	Private college, formerly known as ALKAN Health Science College, with campuses in Addis Ababa, Bahir Dar and Dessie.
Ambo University	Ambo	Oromia	2011	Ambo University was established as an agricultural training center in 1939; however, it had grown into a university by 2011.
Arba Minch University	Arba Minch	South Ethiopia	1993	Initially founded in 1986 as the Arba Minch Water Technology Institute (AWTI)
Arsi University	Asella	Oromia	2014	
Axum University	Axum	Tigray	2007	
Bahir Dar University	Bahir Dar	Amhara	2000	Created by merger of Bahir Dar Polytechnic Institute (est. 1963) and Bahir Dar Teachers College (est. 1972).
BITS College	Addis Ababa	Addis Ababa	2018	Abbreviated to Business, Innovation, Technology, and System, it offers well-designed academic programs in software engineering and IT Management.
Bule Hora University	Bule Hora	Oromia	2001	Public institution
City University College	Addis Ababa	Addis Ababa	2000	
Closys College	Mekelle	Tigray	2014	
Dandii Boruu College	Addis Ababa	Addis Ababa	1994	Campuses in Assosa, Jimma, Shambu and Dessie
Debre Berhan University	Debre Berhan	Amhara	2007	
Debre Markos University	Debre Markos	Amhara	2005	
Debre Tabor University	Debre Tabor	Amhara	2008	
Defence University College of Engineering	Bishoftu	Oromia	1997	
Dembi Dolo University	Dembidolo	Oromia	2015	
Dessie Teacher's Education College	Dessie	Amhara	1972	
Dilla University	Dila	Sidama	2004	
Dire Dawa University	Dire Dawa	Dire Dawa	2006	
Dynamic International University College	Addis Ababa	Addis Ababa	2005	
Ethiopian Catholic University	Addis Ababa	Addis Ababa	2005	
Ethiopian Civil Service University	Addis Ababa	Addis Ababa	1993	
Ethiopian Institute of Architecture, Building Construction and City Development	Addis Ababa	Addis Ababa	1954	
Grace College of Business and Computer Science	Addis Ababa	Addis Ababa	2001	
Haramaya University	Haramaya	Oromia	1954	
Hawassa University	Awasa	Sidama	1999	Formed through the consolidation of three separate schools
Infonet College	Addis Ababa	Addis Ababa	1995	
International Leadership Institute	Addis Ababa	Addis Ababa	2001	
Jethro Leadership & Management Institute	Addis Ababa	Addis Ababa	2009	
Jijiga University	Jijiga	Somali	2007	
Jimma College of Teachers Education	Jimma	Oromia	1961	
Jimma Teachers College	Jimma	Oromia	1969	
Jimma University	Jimma	Oromia	1952	
Jinka University	Jinka	South Ethiopia	2015	
Kebri Dahar University	Kebri Dahar	Afar	2015	
Kunuz College	Addis Ababa	Addis Ababa	2002	private; focus on business
Madda Walabu University	Bale Robe	Oromia	2006	
Mattu University	Mattu	Oromia	2011	
Mekelle Institute of Technology	Mekelle	Tigray	2002	
Mekelle University	Mekelle	Tigray	1993	Public; founded as the Arid Zone Agricultural College
Mizan–Tepi University	Mizan Teferi	South West	2006	Campuses in Mizan Teferi and Tepi
New Generation University College	Addis Ababa	Addis Ababa	2002	
PESC Information Systems College	Addis Ababa	Addis Ababa	2007	
Rift Valley University	Addis Ababa	Addis Ababa	2000	53 campuses around the country. Headquarters in Addis Ababa.
Royal College/Ethiopia	Addis Ababa	Addis Ababa	1999	
Samara University	Semera	Afar	2008	
Select College	Addis Ababa	Addis Ababa	2009	
St. Mary's University	Addis Ababa	Addis Ababa	1998	13 major distance education centres & 160 coordination offices throughout the country
St. Paul's Hospital Millennium Medical College	Addis Ababa	Addis Ababa	2007	
Teferi Mekonnen Polytechnic College	Addis Ababa	Addis Ababa	1925	
Unity University	Addis Ababa	Addis Ababa	1991	
Urban Planning College (Ecole)	Addis Ababa	Addis Ababa	1960	
University of Gondar	Gondar	Amhara	1954	
Wachemo University	Hosaena	Central Ethiopia	2009	
Wolkite University	Welkite	Central Ethiopia	2012	
Washera College	Debre Markos	Amhara	2007	
Wolaita Sodo University	Sodo	South Ethiopia	2007	Another campuses are Gandaba Campus, Otona Campus and Tercha Campus.
Wollega University	Naqamte	Oromia	2007	
Wollo University	Dessie / Kombolcha	Amhara	2007	Wollo University is one of the federal universities in Ethiopia. There are two campuses, one in Dessie and one in Kombolcha.
Kamise College of Teachers Education	Kamise, Oromia Zone	Amhara	2002	Kamise College of Teachers Education is located in Kamise, Oromia Zone, Amhara Region.
