= Arsi University =

Public university in Asella, Oromia Region, Ethiopia

- Motto in English: Like our star athletes, excelling professionals
- Type: Public
- Established: 15 October 2014
- Accreditation: Ministry of Education
- Affiliations: Adama Science and Technology University
- President: Dr. Fikadu Mitiku Abdissa
- Vice-president: Dr. Mustefa Bati
- Location: Asella, Oromia Region, Ethiopia; 7.987°N 39.140°E
- Website: arsiun.edu.et
- Location within Ethiopia

Arsi University is a public higher education institution in Asella, Oromia Region, Ethiopia established in 2014 by the Council of Ministers' Regulation No. 322/2014 as autonomous public university.

== History ==
Arsi University was founded in Asella town on 15 October 2014 under Council of Ministers Regulation No. 322/2014 as autonomous higher education public institution. It was accredited by the Ministry of Education (MoE). Before the establishment, the College of Business and Economics at Arsi University was established at Nazareth Technical College in 1993, and moved to Adama University in 2005. For 2006-7 season, its Department of Economics was incorporated into Adama University, and later renamed as Adama Science and Technology University.

In 2017, the university's College of Agriculture and Environmental Science started to offer B.Sc. Degree and M.Sc. Degree in Animal Health Science. In December 2019, the university's Agriculture campus perceived security problem in the town and students have stated they are "fearing for their lives and are taking a refugee in the wilderness".

== See also ==
- List of universities and colleges in Ethiopia
