= Birtukan Temesgen interview =

2025 interview of an Ethiopian woman

On March 23, 2025, Ethiopian woman Birtukan Temesgen appeared on EBS TV, where she spoke of being kidnapped and raped by OLA militias in the Ethiopian state of Oromia. She recounted being repeatedly gang-raped, severely beaten, and having her womb pierced with an iron rod.

Following the broadcast, there was a wave of national outrage. State-owned media quickly countered the interview with a documentary alleging that Birtukan's case was a fabricated drama orchestrated by Fano militias and EBS personnel. In the aftermath, several journalists from EBS, as well as the network's owners, were detained. Additionally, Birtukan was coerced into appearing on government-controlled media, where she said her story was part of an orchestrated performance, an assertion that raised skepticism among many activists.

== Background ==
Following Abiy Ahmed's rise to power in 2018, there has been a significant increase in murders and kidnappings of individuals of Amhara descent across the state of Oromia. Thousands of Amharas have been killed in various Oromia towns, and numerous women have been subjected to rape. Despite substantial evidence of these atrocities, the government has chosen to remain silent rather than take action.

In December 2019, 17 Amhara students were kidnapped by OLA militias and subsequently disappeared. While government officials, including Abiy Ahmed, acknowledged the kidnappings at the time, no efforts were made to locate the missing students, who have not been heard from since. Since then, thousands of individuals from the Amhara ethnic group have continued to face abduction and murder.

According to The Washington Post, Abiy's government is implicated in these kidnappings, using groups such as Shane, OLA, and Amhara Fanos as scapegoats. Families of the kidnapped individuals are forced to pay ransoms through government-controlled banks, yet the government fails to take action when the kidnappers receive these payments. This strategy aims to turn public sentiment against these informal organizations while fostering support for the government by framing them as responsible for committing atrocities against the people.

== Birtukan Temesgen ==
=== Early life and education ===
Birtukan Temesgen was born and raised in Senan, Gojjam, in the Amhara Region. After her mother died during her childhood, her father migrated, leaving her to live with her grandmother until she turned eight. Despite these hardships, she passed the higher education entrance exam with outstanding scores and enrolled in the pharmacy program at Dembi Dolo University.

=== Kidnapping ===
While in her second year, she was kidnapped on campus as she was walking from the library to her dormitory. Gunmen took her into the jungle, where she endured a year and a half of horrific experiences, including gang rape, which led to her pregnancy and childbirth.

Eventually, the kidnappers abandoned her, and she was left to beg for food for herself and her child.

== Interview on EBS ==
Birtukan appeared on EBS on March 25, 2025 as part of a program dedicated to tragic stories. During the interview, she tearfully recounted her experiences, leaving the media team visibly moved and in tears.

== Aftermath ==
After the program aired on EBS, the situation ignited public outrage, with many individuals expressing intense anger over the atrocities Birtukan reported, and the government's reluctance to protect human rights.

In response, the government denied Birtukan's statements. They pressured EBS Media to remove the video of her interview. and by making to remove the video of her story shared by EBS Media, arresting media personnel, and pressuring Dembi Dolo University to deny her enrollment.

Moreover, Birtukan was made to witness by government owned medias that her statement at EBS was an orchestrated drama by the opposition.
