= Rift Valley University College =

Largest private university in Ethiopia

Rift Valley University
- ሪፍት ቫሊይ ዩኒቨርሲቲ
- Motto: Hub of Excellence!!!
- Type: Private
- Established: October 2000
- Founders: Ato Dinku Deyesa
- Budget: $700 -1,004 USD/month
- President: Abebe Gemechu Lencha
- Academic staff: 727
- Total staff: 4,355
- Students: 16,000
- Location: Jimma, Oromia Region, Ethiopia; 7.677069°N 36.845447°E
- Location in Ethiopia

Rift Valley University (RVU) is the largest private university in Ethiopia, with campuses around the country. Known formerly as Rift Valley University, RVU was granted full-fledged university status in 2014 by Ministry of Education. Its headquarters are in Jimma, Addis Ababa.

== Founding ==
Five persons founded the university in 2000:

- Dinku Deyasa, an investor in Ethiopia and owner of NFYD PLC,
- Dr. Haileleul Zeleke (Assistant Professor),
- Frezewed Lemma (lecturer) from Adama University (the then Nazareth Technical Teachers’ College),
- Reta Bekele, lawyer,
- Dr. Mulugeta Debebe (management professional)

The first batch of students set foot on RVU's first campus in Adama in October 2000. It began with a capital of 1,300,000 Eth. Birr, 154 evening program students, and five part-time staff. Prior to launch, a survey was conducted to identify the fields of study most desired by the community in and around Adama and Asella towns. On the basis of the findings, academic programs commenced at a diploma level in five fields of study, namely Accounting, Computer Science, Law, Marketing Management, and Secretarial Science and Office Management. The Asella satellite campus was launched three months later with Accounting, Law and Marketing Management fields of study. This new learning community was housed in one rented block that consisted of a single administrative office and a few classrooms. By the end of 2000/2001 academic year, total enrolment at the two locations was about 250 students in the five diploma programs of study.

== Accreditation ==
The first accreditation by the Ministry of Education in five diploma level programs of study was earned in 2001 from HERQA and TVET Commissions. In September 2003 and 2004, Gotera and Batu (Ziway) campuses came into being respectively; Bishoftu campus was launched two years later followed by Dire Dawa and Chiro, which begun to operate in August 2005. Bole and Gullele campuses came into being in October 2005. Harar campus was established in October 2006. When the institution was empowered to grant a bachelor's degree, Accounting, Business Management and Law were the first academic programs on offer at the Adama campus.

== Campuses ==
At the start of the 2015/2016 academic year, RVU operated in many campuses' country-wide, one campus in Somaliland and seven distance education centers, each with more than a dozen branch coordination units throughout the country. Through these centers, RVU is able to reach students in remote parts of the country and beyond. After conducting an evaluation of its systems, physical facilities, and learning resources of its campuses and faculties, the Ministry of Education, in collaboration with Higher Education Relevance and Quality Agency (HERQA), granted Rift Valley the status of a full-fledged University in August 2014.

== Programs and partnerships ==
RVU offers more than 20 undergraduate and five graduate programs in business, technology, health and social science fields. RVU provides dozens of Technical Education and Vocational Training programs at all levels.

The university has collaborative partnerships and affiliations with higher learning and research institutions, health service providers, professional associations, industries, and financial institutions locally and internationally.

== Branches ==
List of locations, i e. cities and districts

- Abichu
- Adama
- Ambo
- Asella
- Bahir Dar
- Bale Robe
- Batu
- Bishoftu
- Bole
- Burayu
- Chaffe
- Chiro
- Dire Dawa
- Dembi Dollo
- Gelan
- Gotera
- Gullele
- Harar
- Hargeisa
- Hawassa
- Jimma
- Jigjiga
- Kality
- Kemise
- Lancha
- Lebu Lafto
- Lege Tafo
- Mekele
- Meri Goro
- Mojo
- Negele
- Nekemte
- Shashemene
- Sululta
- Waliso
- Wolaita Sodo
- Yeka
- Metahara
- Wolenchiti
- Diregerfersa
