= Samara University (Ethiopia) =

Public university in Afar Region, Ethiopia

Coordinates: 11.798°N 40.999°E

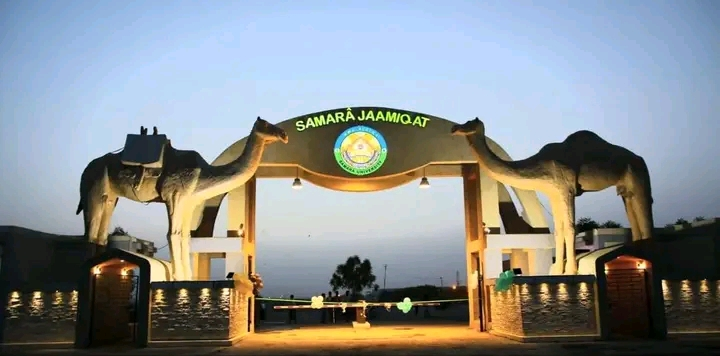
- Type: Public
- Established: 2008
- Accreditation: Ministry of Education
- Location: Semera, Afar Region, Ethiopia
- Campus: Urban
- Nickname: SU
- Website: University website

- Location in Ethiopia

Samara University (SU) is a public higher education institution located in Semera, Afar Region, Ethiopia. Officially accredited by the Ministry of Education (MOE), Samara University is a coeducational higher education institution. Samara University offers courses and programs leading to officially recognized higher education degrees such as bachelor's degrees in several areas of study. Since its inception in 2008, Samara University is making great leaps towards producing competent and dynamic graduates who fulfill the needs and aspirations of the people. SU also provides several academic and non-academic facilities and services to students including a library, as well as administrative services.

== See also ==
- List of universities and colleges in Ethiopia
- Education in Ethiopia
