= Kora Tushune Godana =

Ethiopian academic, researcher, and administrator (born 1969)

- Born: August 15, 1969 (age 57); Adola (formerly Kibremengist), Ethiopian Empire
- Education: Ghent University
- Occupations: Author; teacher; administrator; researcher

Kora Tushune Godana (born 15 August 1969) is an Ethiopian academic, researcher, and administrator known for his contributions to health policy, planning, and financing. Currently, he is serving as vice president for Business and Development at Jimma University.

== Early life and education ==
Godana was born in Adola, Ethiopia, he pursued his undergraduate studies in management at Addis Ababa University from 1983 to 1987, earning a Bachelor of Arts in management. He obtained a Master of Science in Health Policy, Planning, and Financing at the London School of Hygiene and Tropical Medicine, England, during the academic year 1996–1997. He enrolled in a Ph.D. in Health Policy at Ghent University, Belgium, where he is currently a Ph.D. candidate.

== Career ==
He started his career as an Assistant Lecturer in 1990. He has been involved in various research grants and development projects, notably as the coordinator of the NASCERE project at the Jimma University. He has served as an Advisor for the World Health Organization, where he evaluated sustainability projects and contributed to a multi-country study on incentives for community health workers.

In October 2023, he was appointed as the state Minister of Education by Prime Minister Abiy Ahmed.

== Publications ==
Serial No.	Name	Year	Type	Ref
1	"Barriers and facilitators of maternal health care services use among pastoralist women in Ethiopia: Systems thinking perspective"	2022	Article	
2	"Entomological and Anthropological Factors Contributing to Persistent Malaria Transmission in Kenya, Ethiopia, and Cameroon"	2021	Article	
3	"Economic evaluation of Health Extension Program packages in Ethiopia"	2021	Article	
4	"Sexual and Reproductive Health Services Use, Perceptions, and Barriers among Young People in Southwest Oromia, Ethiopia"	2018	Article	
5	"Mapping insecticide resistance and characterization of resistance mechanisms in Anopheles arabiensis in Ethiopia"	2017	Article	
6	"Predictors of self-reported health status of a population in Oromia National Regional State, Ethiopia"	2016	Conference Paper	
7	"Health Insurance Schemes of Ethiopia: An Overview"	2012	Conference Paper	
8	"Cost Effectiveness Analysis of PMTCT Service Delivery Modalities in Addis Ababa (Using Decision Models)"	2011	Book	
