= Malekeh Nazie Eftekhari =

Iranian-American healthcare executive

Malekeh Nazie Eftekhari (born March 24, 1955) is an Iranian-American healthcare executive, entrepreneur, and philanthropist. She is the founder, former chief executive officer and chairman of HealthEZ and Americas PPO.

She is a member of the board of directors for the Iranian American Political Action Committee, the Public Affairs Alliance of Iranian Americans (PAAIA), the Carlson School of Management, the University of Minnesota Medical School, the Walker Art Center, and Children's Hospital and Clinics of Minnesota, and has served as a chapter chair of the Young Presidents' Organization.

She has appeared in the documentary Honor Diaries, which examines gender and human rights issues.

== Biography ==
Eftekhari graduated from Tehran International School in 1971. She attended Pahlavi University from 1971 to 1972, followed by studies at the American College in Paris from 1972 to 1973. She later earned a degree from the London School of Economics in 1976. She obtained a master's degree in Healthcare Administration from the University of Minnesota in 1980.

== Career ==
In 2011, Nazie Eftekhari, founder and chief executive officer of the Araz Group, received the International Immigrant Achievement Award from the International Leadership Institute.

In 2020, Eftekhari's healthcare services companies, HealthEZ and Americas PPO, received an investment from Abry and were sold to Horizon Blue Cross Blue Shield in 2025. Eftekhari founded the Foundation of the Children of Iran, a nonprofit organization that provides healthcare services to Iranian children in the United States.

Eftekhari has served on the boards of the Iranian American Political Action Committee (IAPAC), the Public Affairs Alliance of Iranian Americans, the University of Minnesota Medical School, the Carlson School of Management, the Walker Art Center, and Children's Hospital and Clinics of Minnesota, and has been a member and chapter chair of the Young Presidents' Organization. She endorsed and promoted the 2016 presidential campaign of Hillary Clinton, indicating her endorsement of Clinton's candidacy.

Eftekhari has been featured in the documentary Honor Diaries, a film that explores issues related to gender, culture, and human rights in Muslim societies.
