= Washera College =

Tertiary higher education in Debre Markos, Amhara Region, Ethiopia

Coordinates: 10.35277°N 37.73161°E

- ዋሸራ ኮሌጅ
- Type: Public
- Established: 2003
- Postgraduates: 5,000
- Location: Debre Markos, Amhara Region, Ethiopia

Washera College is a tertiary higher education institution operating in the city of Debre Markos, Ethiopia. It opened in 2003, and was the first college in the city. Washera College offers certificates and diplomas in the regular and extension programs in the fields of Law, Information Technology, Accounting and Secretarial Science. The college had also been offering training for elementary school teachers until the Ministry of Education banned teaching programs in private institutions across the country in 2007. It is reported that more than 5,000 students have graduated. The college conducts teaching/learning processes in its own premises located in the Abima suburb of Debre Marqos. In 2010, the college plans to expand its programs in different fields at bachelor's degree level paving its way to gain university standing. It also aims to offer distance education in various fields. For these expansion projects, Washera College has received an additional land from the municipality of Debre Markos.

== See also ==
- List of universities and colleges in Ethiopia
- Education in Ethiopia
