= Dembi Dolo University =

National university in Oromia Region, Ethiopia

Dambi Dollo University
- Type: National
- Established: 2015
- Accreditation: Ministry of Education
- President: Dr. Delessa Bulcha
- Academic staff: 772
- Undergraduates: 3,750
- Postgraduates: 3,750
- Location: Dembidolo, Oromia Region, Ethiopia; 8.551259°N 39.840737°E
- Language: English
- Website: dadu.edu.et
- Location in Ethiopia

Dambi Dolo University is a national university located in Dembidolo town, in Oromia Region, about 645 kilometers away from Addis Ababa, Ethiopia. Established in 2015, under Proclamation No.650/2001 article 5(1), the campus is situated in 135 hectares.

On 20 May 2018, the university main building was inaugurated by Prime Minister Abiy Ahmed.

== History ==
Dambi Dolo University was officially accredited by the Ministry of Education in 2015 and began the learning process in 2018. It was founded under Proclamation No 650/2001 article 5(1). The university is located in Dambi Dolo town, 645 kilometers west of Addis Ababa. It is situated in an area of 135 hectares. On 20 May 2018, the founding president of Dembi Dolo University was Dr. Delessa Bulcha Neger, who started the university. He invited the prime minister, Abiy Ahmed, and the then president of the Oromia region, Lema Megersa, to the inauguration ceremony of the university, which encompasses 35 departments and has enrolled 1,500 students in this academic year.

Currently, the university is evolving in quality of research and teaching for around 3,750 undergraduate and postgraduate students. Additionally, the university employs 772 academic and administrative staff.

=== 2019 student abduction ===
There is rare evidence for this news, which says in November 2019, 17 students of the university, mostly ethnic Amhara were kidnapped. According to the second president Dr. Leta Tesfaye, 12 of the 17 kidnapped students are from the university campus. In July 2020, the Federal High Court of Ethiopia accused 17 individuals who were suspected of abducting the students for ethnically motivated violence, especially linked to the Oromo Liberation Front (OLF)..

== See also ==
- List of universities and colleges in Ethiopia
- Education in Ethiopia
