= Ethiopian Institute of Architecture, Building Construction and City Development =

Ethiopian development firm

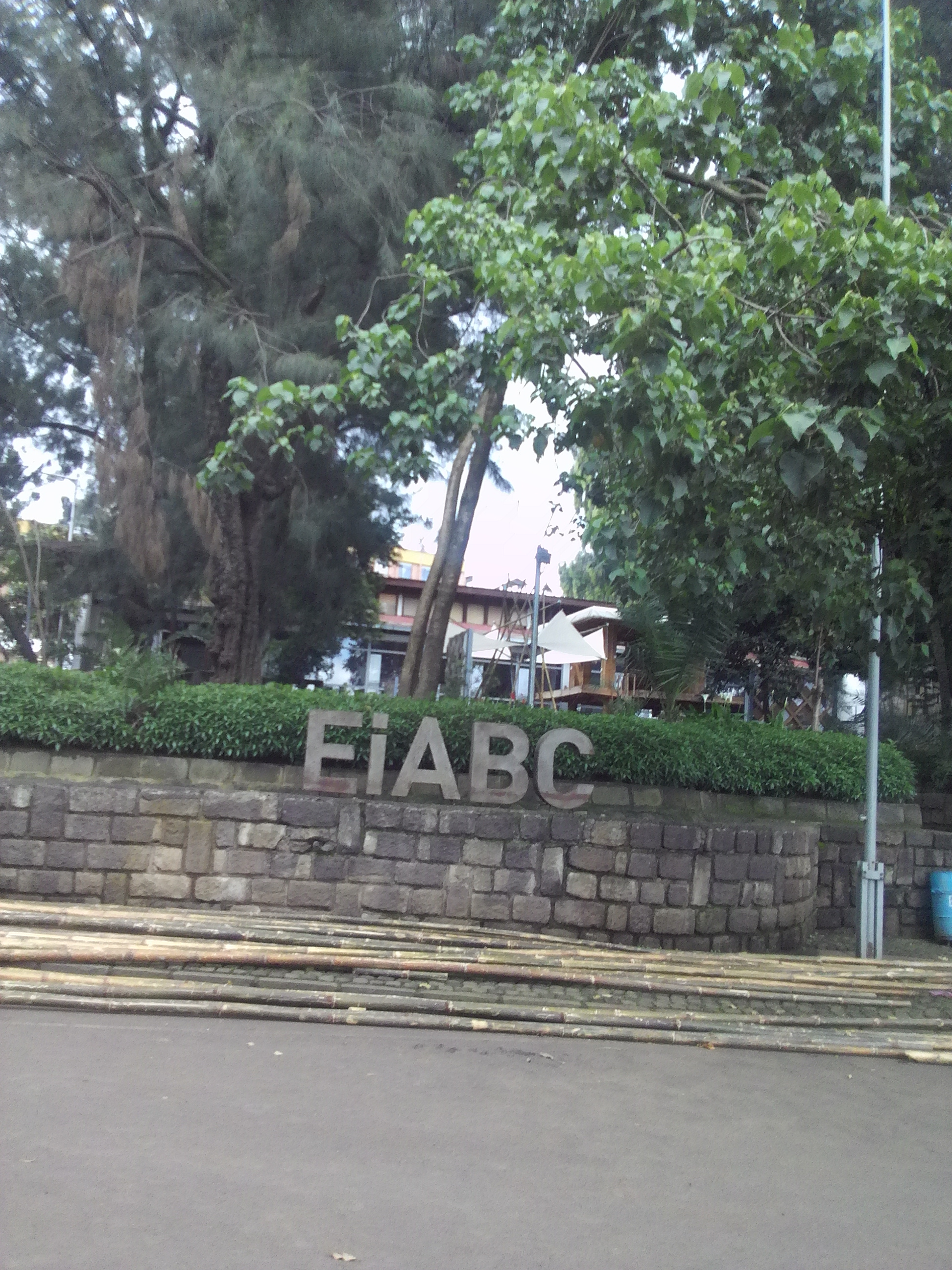
- EiABC photo gallary entrance
- Formation: 1954; 72 years ago 6 March 2010; 16 years ago (Officially inaugurated)
- Type: Public
- Registration no.: 1023100005
- Headquarters: Dej. Balcha Aba Nefso St, Arada, Addis Ababa, Ethiopia
- Coordinates: 9.012935°N 38.730597°E
- Region served: Ethiopia
- Executive scientific director: Dr. Heyaw Terefe
- Website: www.eiabc.edu.et
- Formerly called: Building College

The Ethiopian Institute of Architecture, Building Construction and City Development (EiABC) is an institute for architectural and civil construction in Addis Ababa, Ethiopia.

== History ==
In 1969, the Building College merged with the College of Engineering and formed the Faculty of Technology under Addis Ababa University, and remained as such until 2009. On 6 March 2010, the institute was reformed into its current state as the Ethiopian Institute of Architecture, Building Construction and City Development.

== See also ==
- List of universities and colleges in Ethiopia
- Education in Ethiopia
