= Jinka University =

- ጂንካ ዩኒቨርሲቲ
- Motto: Knowledge for Change!
- Type: Public
- Established: 2015
- President: Dr. Yohannes Yitbarek
- Academic staff: 394
- Administrative staff: 650
- Students: 8,000+
- Location: Jinka, South Omo Zone, Ethiopia; 5.7800°N 36.5700°E
- Campus: Urban
- Website: jku.edu.et
- Location in Ethiopia

Jinka University (Amharic: ጂንካ ዩኒቨርሲቲ) is a public university located in Jinka, South Omo Zone, Ethiopia. Established in 2015 under Council of Ministers Regulation No. 353/2015, it is one of Ethiopia's fourth-generation higher education institutions.

== History ==
Jinka University was founded in October 2015 as part of Ethiopia's Second Growth and Transformation Plan (GTP II). It began academic operations with four colleges and 14 departments.

== Campus ==
The university's main campus is situated in Jinka, approximately 750 km southwest of Addis Ababa. The campus includes academic buildings, laboratories, student residences, libraries, and administrative facilities.

== Academics ==
Jinka University offers undergraduate and postgraduate programs across five colleges:

- College of Agriculture and Natural Resources
- College of Natural and Computational Sciences
- College of Social Sciences and Humanities
- College of Business and Economics
- College of Health Sciences

As of 2025, the university offers 29 undergraduate and 7 postgraduate programs. Postgraduate fields include Accounting and Finance, Developmental Economics, Agricultural Economics, Business Administration, and Social Anthropology.

== Administration ==
The university is led by its current president, Dr. Yohannes Yitbarek.

== Research and community engagement ==
Jinka University emphasizes research that addresses regional challenges and supports sustainable development. Its primary focus areas include biodiversity, agro-industries, livestock and fisheries, and cultural tourism. The university also provides consultancy and knowledge-sharing services that benefit local communities.

In 2020, Jinka University became the host of the South Omo Research Center (SORC), which was previously part of Arba Minch University. SORC promotes the documentation and preservation of indigenous cultures through research, exhibitions, and public education.

The university also participates in the Omo–Turkana Biodiversity Research Center, a collaborative project involving local and international institutions focused on conserving the region's ecological and cultural diversity.

== Partnerships and collaborations ==
The university works with various national and international partners including:

- Japan International Cooperation Agency (JICA) – for research capacity building and technical cooperation
- Frobenius Institute – for anthropological and cultural heritage research
- Universities in Canada, the United States, and Kenya – for academic exchange and biodiversity research

== See also ==
- List of universities and colleges in Ethiopia
- Education in Ethiopia
