= Jimma Teachers College =

College in Jimma, Oromia Region, Ethiopia

- Former names: Teachers Training Institution
- Type: Teachers college
- Established: 1969; 57 years ago
- Location: Jimma, Oromia Region, Ethiopia
- Website: www.jcte.edu.et

Jimma Teachers College is a college in Jimma, Oromia Region, Ethiopia.

Established in 1969 as the Teachers Training Institute, it trained elementary school teachers in the country. In 1995, the institute upgraded to a college.

Jimma College of Teachers Education (Jimma CTE) is located 347 km (216 mi) southwest of Addis Ababa and about 2.5 km (1.6 mi) to the northeast of Jimma City Centre. Jimma CTE is one of several regional Teachers’ Training Colleges in Ethiopia established specifically to produce qualified teachers for primary schools (grades 1–8). In accordance with the 1994 National Education and Training Policy, Jimma CTE was upgraded from a Teachers’ Training Institute (TTI) as it had been for 28 years (1961-1988 E.C.) and, as a college, launched its first two-year Training Program (Diploma Program) in July 1988 E.C. during the summer semester.

It goes without saying that such an important educational change-over as the inauguration of Jimma CTE, which took place after nearly three decades after the institution's inception as a TTI, caused a certain excitement as well as some anxiety amongst those who were closely affiliated to the college. The transformation required great imagination and better physical resources and, although Jimma CTE still has a long way to go before it becomes a fully-grown institution of higher education, it has made a good start towards meeting the growing regional demand for qualified primary school teachers.

== See also ==
- List of universities and colleges in Ethiopia
- Education in Ethiopia
