= City University College (Ethiopia) =

Higher education college in Ethiopia

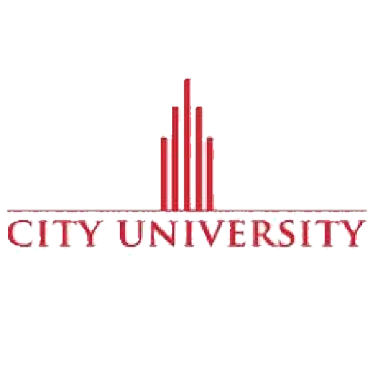
- Established: 2000
- President: Dr Eyayu Leulseged
- Location: Addis Ababa, Ethiopia
- Website: www.cuc.edu.et

City University College is a tertiary institution in Addis Ababa, Ethiopia. It provides higher education in the disciplines of Accounting and Finance, Applied Computer Science, Management, Economics and Law.

== See also ==
- List of universities and colleges in Ethiopia
- Education in Ethiopia
