= Infonet College =

Private tertiary education institution in Addis Ababa, Ethiopia

- Type: Private
- Established: May 1995
- President: Solomon G.Michael
- Location: Addis Ababa, Ethiopia
- Website: www.infonetcollege.edu.et

Infonet College is a private tertiary education institution of higher learning in Addis Ababa, Ethiopia that trains in Information and Communication Technology. The institute was founded in 1995 by a team of professionals from the fields of computer science, business, and social science.

The college offers both long- and short-term trainings and consultancy services on various fields. Infonet College was born out of the Infonet Computer Center, a private limited company established in 1994 in Ethiopia.

== See also ==
- List of universities and colleges in Ethiopia
- Education in Ethiopia
