= Barchaa =

Ethiopian cultural custom

Barchaa is a cultural custom and social relation passed down from one generation to another and is widely known in Oromia, Ethiopia. Barchaa, when practiced, people like to get together with relatives, neighbours, or other visitors in a designated room in private houses and lie on their sides on a pile of cushions to contemplate, read and engage in talking. It is accompanied by chewing khat and drinking coffee, tea, water, and soft drinks.
