= New Generation University College =

Private college in Ethiopia

- Type: Private
- Established: 2002
- President: Matthew Gichile Tura
- Location: Addis Ababa, Mettu, Nekemte, Oromia Region, Ethiopia
- Website: https://www.nguc.edu.et/

New Generation University College is a private college in Ethiopia. Founded to provide private higher education opportunities for students in Ethiopia, NGUC has branches in Addis Ababa, and Nekemte and Mettu towns in Oromia. It is one of the growing new private colleges in the country. New Generation also have branches in a neighboring countries like Somaliland, and have a big campus in Hargiesa. Many children of African and east European Embassy employees' in the Addis Ababa diplomatic community attend NGUC. The Vision of the New Generation University College (NGUC) as a 'Center for Excellence' was born out of the dynamic ideas and the desire to assist the national and regional endeavors to provide an adequate number of total quality higher education institutions.

== Notable alumni and residents ==
- Dr. Negasso Gidada - Professor, Oromo politician and former Ethiopian president
- Temesgen Zewdie - Opposition MP, leader of UDJ party

== See also ==
- List of universities and colleges in Ethiopia
- Education in Ethiopia
