= Jethro Leadership Management Institute =

Institution in Addis Ababa, Ethiopia

Jethro Leadership & Management Institute
- Type: Private
- Established: 2009
- President: Samuel Assefa
- Location: Addis Ababa, Ethiopia
- Website: www.jethrolmi.com

Jethro Leadership Management Institute (Jethro-lmi) is a leadership and management institution based in Addis Ababa, Ethiopia.

== Overview ==
Jethro-lmi is an educational and training center that provides a leadership and management skill development program for organizations (private, government not-profit) and individuals across the country and abroad. The institution's main service areas include: short-term leadership & management development training, international qualifications and certification programs, and overseas MBA and consultancy services.

Jethro-lmi is an Authorized Training Partner with Institute of Certified Professional Managers (ICPM), which is a business center of James Madison University located in Harrisonburg, Virginia, United States, to provide Certified Manager (CM) program in Ethiopia.

Beside International Professional Qualification Certifications, Jethro-LMI provides more than 200 short-Term trainings, Research and management consultancy services. The Institute provides short term training courses for Privet, Government and NGO sectors with the main categories: Banking, Microfinance, Insurance, Construction Engineering, Manufacturing Companies, Development and humanitarian organizations

== See also ==
- List of universities and colleges in Ethiopia
- Education in Ethiopia
