= Addis Continental Institute of Public Health =

Public health center in Addis Ababa, Ethiopia

Coordinates: 9.02855°N 38.87741°E

- Type: Institute
- Established: 2006
- Director: Professor Yemane Berhane
- Location: Addis Ababa, Ethiopia
- Website: www.addiscontinental.edu.et

Addis Continental Institute of Public Health (AC-IPH) is an independent center for public health research and training. It was established in mid-2006 by health experts to provide technical services and training in major health issues in Africa. The institute is based in Addis Ababa, Ethiopia. And currently has opened a new branch in Bahir Dar, Ethiopia.

== See also ==
- List of universities and colleges in Ethiopia
- Education in Ethiopia
