= Closys College =

Educational institution in Tigray Region, Ethiopia

- Ge'ez: ክሎሲስ ኮሌጅ
- Location: Mekelle, Tigray Region, Ethiopia

Closys College (Ge'ez: ክሎሲስ ኮሌጅ) is an educational institution located in the city of Mekelle, situated in the northern Tigray Region of Ethiopia. It is 783 kilometers away from Addis Ababa, the capital, to the north.

== See also ==
- List of universities and colleges in Ethiopia
- Education in Ethiopia
