= Dire Dawa University =

Public university in Dire Dawa, Ethiopia

- Motto: Oasis of Knowledge
- Type: Public university
- Established: 2006
- Accreditation: Ministry of Education
- President: Ubah Adem
- Vice-president: Megersa Kasim Hussen
- Academic staff: 1,177
- Students: 12,500 (2018)
- Location: Dire Dawa, Ethiopia; 9.619900°N 41.840745°E
- Campus: 1
- Language: English
- Website: www.ddu.edu.et
- Location in Ethiopia

Dire Dawa University is a public university located in Dire Dawa, Ethiopia. It opened for the 2006–07 academic year with 754 students, as one of 13 new universities started by the Ministry of Higher Education, Federal Democratic Republic of Ethiopia.

== History ==
Dire Dawa University was established in 2006 with enrollment of 754 students in three facilities: (Faculty of Natural Science and Mathematics, Faculty of Social Science and language and Faculty of Business and Economics) in 13 different undergraduate academic programs with 90 teachers and 103 administrative support staff operating with limited facilities. In 2008, an affiliate campus of Haramaya University was merged to Dire Dawa University to construct more buildings and workshops.

In 2017/2018, DDU established one Institute of Technology and Five Colleges (College of Natural & Computational Science, College of Business & Economics, College of Social Sciences & Humanities, College of Law and College of Medicine and Health Science) containing 33 different academic programs. An enrollment has been increased to 12,500 in 39 academic programs; 7,971 of whom learned evening, weekend and summer in different programs.

Dire Dawa Institute of Technology is one of ten institutes in Ethiopia responsible for industry-led economic transition. Prioritizing science and technology, DDU implemented national policy of 70:30 (Engineering & Natural Science to Social Sciences). As of 2018, the university had 1,177 academic staffs; 834 were on duty whereas 343 were in full study to leave second and third degree.

The academic staffs consisted of 28% of first-degree holders, and 72% of second-degree and above holders. DDU also has 1,143 permanent academic staffs, half of them are lecturers. whereas 28% contract based staffs and 58% technical staffs during 2007–2018 academic year.

== Faculties and colleges ==
- School of Law
- School of Medicine
- College of Business & Economics
- College of Social Sciences & Humanities
- College of Natural & Computational Sciences
- Institute of Technology

== Administration ==
Dire-Dawa University is governed by a University Board of Directors, with day-to-day management provided by a President and several Vice Presidents.

As of June 2019, the leadership team of Dire Dawa University comprises:

- Ubah Adem, Ph.D., President, Dire-Dawa University
- Megersa Kasim, Ph.D., Academic Affairs V/President
- Temam Awol, Ph.D., Business Process and Development V/President
- Solomon Zerihun, Ph.D., Research and Community Engagement V/President
- Abreham Ewnetu, Ph.D., Administration and Student Affairs V/President
- Tewodros Gedefaye, A/Scientific Director

== See also ==
- List of universities and colleges in Ethiopia
- Education in Ethiopia
