= Dessie Teacher's Education College =

Teacher training college in Ethiopia

- Type: Teacher's college
- Established: 1972
- Parent institution: Amhara National Regional State Education Bureau
- Location: South Wollo Zone, Amhara Region, Ethiopia

Dessie Teacher's Education College is a teacher's college in Ethiopia, found in the South Wollo zone which is known as Dessie in the north of Ethiopia. It is managed by the Amhara National Regional State Education Bureau.

== See also ==
- List of universities and colleges in Ethiopia
- Education in Ethiopia
