= Urban Planning College =

Public university in Addis Ababa, Ethiopia

College of Urban Planning (Ecole)
- Type: Public
- Established: 1960s
- Location: Addis Ababa, Ethiopia

The College of Urban Planning (French: Ecole superieure d'amenagement et d'urbanisme) is a public university in Addis Ababa, Ethiopia. It was founded in the 1960s through a bilateral agreement between the Ethiopian and French governments.

== Overview ==
It was intended to train higher technicians serving Ethiopian cities. In the early years of its establishment, French was the medium of instruction, which was later taught as a credited course. The college was known for its unique multi-disciplinary training in architecture, urban planning and civil engineering.

In 1996, it was merged with the Ethiopian Civil Service University and renamed as the Faculty of Urban Studies. Since then, the faculty has organized itself under the Ethiopian Civil Service University to continue its central role in the development of Ethiopian urban centers.

== See also ==
- List of universities and colleges in Ethiopia
- Education in Ethiopia
