= Debre Markos University =

Public research university in Debre Markos, Amhara Region, Ethiopia

- Type: Public
- Established: January 2005; 18 November 2007 (inaugurated)
- President: Sayeh Kassaw (PhD)
- Academic staff: 1,556
- Students: 27,460
- Location: Debre Markos, Amhara Region, Ethiopia; 10.33081°N 37.74262°E
- Website: www.dmu.edu.et

Debre Markos University (DMU) is a public research university in Debre Markos, Amhara Region, Ethiopia. It was established in 2005 and has been growing fast.

== Overview ==
Debre Markos University (DMU) is a public research university in Debre Markos, Ethiopia. DMU is located in the area endowed with pleasant weather, abundant natural resources, including Choke Mountains water-shade which covers six different agro-ecology zones within 50 km (31 mi) radius with various bio-diversity and source of many tributaries to the Nile, and Upper Blue Nile Gorge. DMU was established in January 2005 and two years later it began teaching the first enrolled 760 regular students with 53 faculty members, 34 administrative staff, and 21 contract servants.

Currently, DMU has 51 undergraduate, 47 postgraduate, and 2 PhD programs in regular, continuing, and distance educations. These programs are given at three centers: Main campus in Debre Markos, Burie campus in Burie, and Bichena campus in Bichena. DMU has been providing competitive and skilled graduates to the national and international organizations in 11 round graduation ceremonies in first and second-degree programs. In addition to these, 126 medical doctors graduated in three rounds.

The university currently has three campuses, five colleges, two schools, and three institutes.

== Academics ==
The university has 9 colleges, institutes, and schools.

=== College of Social Science and Humanity ===
- Amharic
- English
- History
- Geography
- Civics
- Sociology
- Psychology

=== Natural and Computational Science ===
- Biology
- Chemistry
- Mathematics
- Physics
- Sport Science
- Statistics
- Biotechnology

Geology

=== College of Business and Economics ===
- Economics
- Management
- Accounting and Finance

=== College of Agriculture and Natural Resource ===
- Natural Resource Management
- Rural Development
- Animal Science
- Plant Science
- Horticulture
- Agro Economics
- Agri Business
- Agroforestry
- Veterinary laboratory technology

=== College of Health Science ===
- Public Health
- Pediatrics and child health Nursing
- Nursing
- Midwifery
- Pharmacy
- Health Informatics
- Human Nutrition and Food Science
- Environmental Health
- Medical Laboratory Science and Technology

=== Debre Markos Institute of Technology ===
- Civil Engineering
- Electrical and Computer Engineering
- Mechanical Engineering
- Construction Technology and Management
- Information Technology
- Hydraulics and Water Resource Engineering
- Software Engineering
- Computer Science
- Aerospace Engineering
- Chemical Engineering
- Information System
- Industrial Engineering
- Architecture
- Biomedical Engineering

=== School of Law ===
- Law

=== School of Medicine ===
- Medicine
- Medical Radiology Technology(MRT)
- Anesthesia

=== Institute of Land Administration ===
- Land Administration and Surveying
- Real Property Valuation

School of postgraduate postgraduate in Environment and Land Resource Management

=== Partnership ===
- International

International Partners
No.	International Partners	Common Collaboration areas and objectives
1	North-west University, South Africa	Exchange of students and academic staff Joint research activities and quality assurance
2	IMC University of applied sciences, Austria	Joint program launching and project development Exchange of publications, teaching and staff
3	Gig watt Global cooperative, Netherlands & Gig watt Global wind LLC, United States	Cooperation for Developing, constructing and operating photovoltaic and wind electricity production facilities in DMU
4	Teach for Ethiopia, Alexandria, Egypt	Recruiting outstanding recent graduates of DMU to join TFE fellowship TFE and DMU will jointly to ensure the program's success and sustainability Cooperating in strategic initiatives
5	Antenna foundation, Geneva, Switzerland	Collaborative research study on science related topics Establish collaboration programs
6	Beza international Inc, USA	Capacity building (Scholarship, staff and student exchange) Conducting Joint project and Undertaking community development Resource acquisition
7	People to People Inc, USA	Conducting Joint project and Undertaking community development Capacity building (Scholarship, staff and student exchange); Resource acquisition (Text books, computers, Lab equipments)
8	University of Nairobi, Kenya	Exchange of students at MSC and PhD levels Exchanging, preserving and promoting culture Co-supervision of Doctoral Dissertations
9	South Eastern Oklahoma state University, Oklahoma, USA	Exchange of students and academic staff Short-term academic programs and trainings for staff Joint quality assurance Expansion and dissemination of knowledge
10	UNVERSIT'A'T HAMBURG, Hamburg, Germany	Joint programs, research, lectures and seminars Exchange of students(undergraduate, MSC, and PhD), academic and administration staff
11	UNIVERSITA' DEGLISTUDI DEL MOLISE, Italy	Promote research and teaching activities Deepen the understanding of economic, cultural and social issues
12	Kempten University, Germany	Exchange of programs of under and postgraduate students, academic information, materials where appropriate Development of joint degree programs, start-up projects.
13	International University college of Turin (IUCT)	Training (both short term and long term) Exchange of publications and academic materials, academic staffs Opening joint programs Establishing research centers

- National

No.	National Partners	Common Collaboration areas and objectives
1	Addis Ababa University, Addis Ababa	Establish of Climate Science center at choke mountains Joint research programs and projects on: solid and liquid waste management, Pollution, Water shade management, Urban sustainability issues, Establishment of analytical laboratory, etc.. Solar radiation distribution and the effect on Agriculture/crop production
2	Ethiopian Institute of Agricultural Research(EIAR), Addis Ababa	Jointly work on relevant technology generation, initiate technology dissemination programs and projects Hosting postgraduate students for their research Agree to share research laboratories and teaching facilities; share staff for relevant research and post graduate research
3	Jimma University, Jimma	Jointly conduct research and development activities, organize capacity building and offer demand driven training, organize conferences Support each other in designing curricula Facilitate student exchange Share scholarly and academic materials
4	Abay Basin development office, Bahir Dar	Joint proposal development, development of guidelines, manuals Sharing of laboratories and libraries Joint publications and research outputs
5	Ethiopian Environment and Forest research institute/EEFRI/, Addis Ababa	Joint capacity building, research and use of laboratory facilities
6	Ethiopian Public health Institute	Organize scientific symposium, conferences Carry out joint research including MSc and PhD programs Exchange of scientific and technical information Co-supervision of MSc and Doctoral thesis
7	Bright Future Initiative	Exchange data resources on the issue of disability and rehabilitation Joint project development and implementation Resource utilization within and outside the entities Exchange of skill knowledge and experience
8	Human Bridge College	Provision of hospital beds, Bedside table and other medical equipment
9	Catholic Relief services Ethiopia ( Farmer to Farmer / F2F/ program)	Enable CRS access and provide technical assistance Broaden the participation of Rural poor in establishing commodity value chains....
10	Frances G. Cosco Foundation- Education for change “ FGCF”	Improve access to learning materials Upgrading teachers pedagogical skills Set standards-based outcome targets

- collaboration-areas

== See also ==
- List of universities and colleges in Ethiopia
- Education in Ethiopia
