= Dandii Boruu University College =

Private college in Ethiopia

Dandii Boru University College
- Type: Private
- Established: 1994
- President: Dr. Likissa Dinssa
- Location: Addis Ababa, Ethiopia
- Campus: Dessie, Jimma, Nekemte, Shambu
- Website: www.dandiiboru.net/dbc/dandii%20boru%20college/index-college.html

Dandii Boru University College is a private college in Ethiopia. It has campuses in Dessie, Jimma, Nekemte and Shambu. Dandii Boru also has a primary, secondary and high school in the capital Addis Ababa.

== See also ==
- List of universities and colleges in Ethiopia
- Education in Ethiopia
