= International Leadership Institute =

Institute in Addis Ababa, Ethiopia

- Type: Private
- Established: 2001
- President: Professor Badeg Bekele
- Location: Addis Ababa, Ethiopia
- Website: www.ili.edu.et

The International Leadership Institute (ILI) is a leadership institute in Addis Ababa, Ethiopia.

== Programs ==
ILI offers undergraduate degrees, diplomas, certificates and other training programs to eligible students. It also runs a master's degree program in Organizational Leadership in Addis Ababa.

== Partners ==
The institute's financial partners include the World Bank, Christian Relief & Development Association (CRDA), Leadership Center of Ghana (LCG), Hope Africa University, and International Leadership Association (ILA). Among its academic partners are the Azusa Pacific University in the United States and the University of Greenwich Business School in the United Kingdom.

== See also ==
- List of universities and colleges in Ethiopia
- Education in Ethiopia
