= Jijiga University =

University in Jijiga, Somali Region, Ethiopia

- Jigjiga University
- Established: 2005
- President: Dr. Bashir Abdulahi Mohamed
- Academic staff: 53
- Total staff: 722
- Students: 2,800 (2009)
- Location: Abdi Mahamud Ahmed, Jijiga, Somali Region, Ethiopia; 9.359°N 42.829°E
- Website: Official website

- Location within Ethiopia

Jijiga University is a university in Jijiga, the capital of the Somali Region, Ethiopia. Jijiga is located in the south eastern part of Ethiopia, 635 kilometres (395 mi) from Addis Ababa. Jijiga University is one of the 13 newly founded governmental universities in Ethiopia.

== History ==
Jigjiga University was established in 2007 with 714 students, expanding to take in c. 1,500 students in 2008, and c. 2,800 in 2009.

== Law school ==
The Jigjiga University Faculty of Law was formed in 2004 and planned to graduate its first batch graduates in July 2009. The faculty has and academic staff of over 25 and takes about 60 students each year in a regular program and over 500 summer in service students.

== See also ==
- List of universities and colleges in Ethiopia
- Education in Ethiopia
