= Addis Ababa Science and Technology University =

Higher institute in Addis Ababa, Ethiopia

Coordinates: 8.8872°N 38.8096°E

- አዲስ አበባ ሳይንስና ቴክኖሎጂ ዩኒቨርሲቲ
- Latin: Scientia Neanthopolis universitates et ars
- Motto: University for Industry
- Type: State university
- Established: 2011; 15 years ago
- President: Dereje Engida (PhD.)
- Undergraduates: 8,000
- Postgraduates: 700
- Location: Addis Ababa
- Campus: Addis Ababa (one main campus)
- Language: English
- Website: aastu.edu.et

Addis Ababa Science and Technology University (Amharic: አዲስ አበባ ሳይንስና ቴክኖሎጂ ዩኒቨርስቲ), or AASTU, is a higher education institute in Addis Ababa, Ethiopia. The main campus is located in the Akaky Kaliti subcity, Kilinto area around Tulu dimtu.

The concept of Addis Ababa Science and Technology University had a direct and reasonable connection with the Five-Year Growth and Transformation Plan (2010–2015) of the government of the Federal Democratic Republic of Ethiopia. As it was stated in the plan, the establishment of well institutionalized and strong science and technology universities and institutes of technology will serve as a cornerstone to build an economically developed and industrialized state of Ethiopia. As a result, AASTU was founded in 2011 under the Directive of the Council of Ministers No. 216/2011 by admitting the first batch (2000 students) in November 2011.

Currently, the university has enrolled more than 8000 undergraduate (under regular and continuing education program) and close to 700 postgraduate students under its nine applied sciences, technology, engineering and ICT focused schools. AASTU is a university in the making, and much of its short-term plans aim at establishing academic infrastructures and facilities, staff recruitment and manpower development. So far, the university managed to recruit 472 academic staff and 391 administrative staff.

== Colleges ==
- College of Engineering
- College of Humanities and Social Sciences
- College of Applied and Natural Sciences

== See also ==
- List of universities and colleges in Ethiopia
- Addis Ababa University
- Education in Ethiopia
