= Jimma University =

Public research university in Jimma, Oromia Region, Ethiopia

- Motto: We are in the Community!
- Type: National
- Established: 1952
- Accreditation: Ministry of Education
- President: Dereje Engida
- Vice-president: Gemechis File (Business and Development)
- Faculty: 2,600
- Total staff: +4,000
- Students: 42,000
- Location: Jimma, Oromia Region, Ethiopia; 7.681°N 36.854°E
- Language: English
- Colors: Royal Blue
- Website: www.ju.edu.et
- Location within Ethiopia

Jimma University (JU) is a public research university located in Jimma, Oromia Region, Ethiopia. It is recognized as the leading national university, as ranked first by the Federal Ministry of Education for four successive years (2009–2012). The establishment of Jimma university dates back to 1952 when Jimma College of Agriculture was founded. The university got its current name in December 1999 following the amalgamation of Jimma College of Agriculture (founded in 1952) and Jimma Institute of Health Sciences (founded in 1983).

== Overview ==
The university is located in the city of Jimma, situated around 352 kilometers southwest of Addis Ababa. Its grounds cover some 167 hectares. JU is Ethiopia's first innovative community-oriented educational institution of higher learning, with teaching centers for healthcare students in Jimma, Omo Nada, Shebe, Agaro, and Asendabo. JU is a pioneer in Public health training. It has academic and scientific collaboration with numerous national and international partners. JU also publishes the biannual Ethiopian Journal of Health Sciences, and launched the Jimma University Journal of Law in October 2007.

== Academics ==
The university has more than 4,000 faculty and staff members. It also has twelve research facilities, a hospital, a community school, a community radio station (FM 102.0), an ICT center, and libraries. The university operates on four campuses and is establishing its fifth campus at Agaro. Currently, the university educates more than 43,000 students in 56 undergraduate and 103 postgraduate programs in regular, summer, and distance education with more enrollments in the years to come.

=== Faculties, Institutes and Schools ===
The university consists of the following academic units:

- School of Graduate Studies
- Institute of Health
- Institute of Technology
- Institute of Education and Professional Development Studies
- College Of Agriculture and Veterinary Medicine
- College of Business and Economics
- College of Natural Sciences
- College of Humanities and Social Sciences
- College of Law and Governance
- School of Art
- Agaro Campus

=== Jimma University College of Public Health and Medical Sciences ===
The establishment of the College of Health Sciences of Jimma University (JU) can be traced back to 1983 with the birth of the then Jimma Institute of Health Sciences (JIHS). The very beginning of the establishment of JIHS is marked as a continuation of the Ras Desta Damtew Health Assistant Training School established in 1967 by the Ethio-Netherlands Health Project on the premises of Jimma Hospital. On this foundation, the School of Nursing was established in 1983. Subsequently, the School of Medicine as well as the School of Pharmacy emerged in 1985; the School of Medical Laboratory Technology and the School of Environmental Health launched in 1987 and 1988, respectively.

Jimma University Teaching Hospital (JUTH) is one of the oldest public hospitals in the country. It was established in 1922. Geographically, it is located in Jimma City 352 km southwest of the capital Addis Ababa. It has been governed under the Ethiopian government by the name of "Ras Desta Damtew Hospital" and later "Jimma Hospital" during Dergue regime and currently Jimma University Specialized Teaching Hospital.

Cognizant of the growing service and teaching role of the hospital, the federal government considered the construction of a new and level- best 600 bedded hospital which will be functional as of September 2015.

=== Department of Materials Science & Engineering ===
Department of Materials Science & Engineering, as a national role model for research-oriented departments, was established with a start-up budget of US$10 million. This is the first comprehensive department of materials science in Ethiopia, which offers all MSE programs. The main theme of the department research is nano-materials under the supervision of Professor Ali Eftekhari, President of the American Nano Society.

== Notable alumni ==
- Gebisa Ejeta - 2009 World Food Prize winner (considered the Nobel prize of Agriculture)
- Lia Tadesse - Ethiopia Minister of Health

== See also ==
- List of universities and colleges in Ethiopia
- Education in Ethiopia
