= Madda Walabu University =

University in Ethiopia

- Yunivarsiitii Madda Walaabuu
- Motto: "Devoted to Impact"
- Type: Public
- Established: 2006
- President: Berhanemeskel Tena(PhD)
- Students: 12,190
- Location: Robe, Oromia Region, Ethiopia; 7.143°N 39.999°E
- Campus: Bale Robe main campus, Goba Health College and Teaching Referral Hospital
- Language: English, Amharic and Afan Oromo
- Website: Official website

Madda Walabu University (MWU) is a public university located in Robe, Bale Zone, Oromia Region, Ethiopia. Established in March 2005 and officially inaugurated in 2006, it is an autonomous public higher education institution under the Ethiopian Ministry of Education. The university's main campus is situated approximately 430 km (270 mi) southeast of Addis Ababa, the capital of Ethiopia.

The university operates three campuses in Robe, Goba, and Shashemene. It offers 116 academic programmes, comprising 52 undergraduate, 58 master's, and six doctoral programmes, delivered through 79 departments organized under six colleges and three schools. Its principal academic and research focus areas include agriculture, tourism, biodiversity, and health sciences.

== History ==
The university is named after Madda Walabu, a historic site located about 227 km (141 mi) southwest of Robe in southeastern Ethiopia. The site holds significant historical and cultural importance for the Oromo people and is traditionally regarded as one of the centres of Oromo spiritual, cultural, and political life. It is associated with the Gadaa system and the Chaffe (general assembly), and is regarded in Oromo tradition as one of the cradles of Oromo civilization.

The university derives its name from the site in recognition of its historical and cultural significance. Since its establishment, Madda Walabu University has expanded its academic programmes, campuses, research activities, and community engagement initiatives to serve southeastern Ethiopia.

== Vision ==
Madda Walabu University aims to become an autonomous, innovative, and community-engaged university recognised nationally and internationally for practical education, applied research, good governance, and digital transformation by 2035.

== Mission ==
The university's mission is to produce competent, ethical, and innovative graduates; undertake problem-solving research; empower communities; and promote sustainable development through quality education, technology transfer, community engagement, and good governance.

== Core values ==
The university identifies the following institutional core values:

- Customer-centred service
- Quality first
- Academic freedom
- Accountability
- Trustworthiness
- Fighting corruption
- Equity and inclusiveness
- Serving humanity

== Motto ==
The school's motto is Devoted to Impact.

== Campus ==
Madda Walabu University operates three campuses:

- Robe Campus (main campus)
- Goba Campus
- Shashemene Campus

The university serves Bale, East Bale, West Arsi, and East Borena zones of Oromia Regional State. Its location provides access to diverse ecosystems, cultural heritage sites, forests, agricultural areas, and tourism destinations that support teaching, research, and community service.

== Governance and administration ==
Madda Walabu University is administered as a public higher education institution under the Ministry of Education.

The university's governance structure includes:

- President
- Vice presidents
- Academic Commission
- University Senate
- Directorates and administrative offices

== Academic organisation ==
The university offers undergraduate and postgraduate education through six colleges and three schools.

=== College of Agriculture and Natural Resources ===
The College offers undergraduate and postgraduate programmes in agricultural sciences, natural resource management, biodiversity conservation, rural development, and related fields.

=== College of Engineering ===
The College provides engineering education in Civil Engineering, Mechanical Engineering, Water Resources and Irrigation Engineering, Construction Technology and Management, Architectural Engineering, Electrical Engineering, and related engineering disciplines.

=== College of Computing ===
The College offers programmes in computer science, information systems, information science, information technology, and data science.

=== College of Natural and Computational Sciences ===
The College provides programmes in mathematics, statistics, biology, chemistry, physics, environmental science, and sport science.

=== College of Social Sciences and Humanities ===
The College offers programmes in languages, geography, history, journalism, sociology, governance, environmental studies, and related disciplines.

=== College of Business and Economics ===
The College provides undergraduate and postgraduate education in management, accounting and finance, economics, marketing, tourism, hospitality, and business administration.

=== School of Health Sciences ===
The School offers programmes in pharmacy, nursing, midwifery, public health, medical laboratory science, and other health science disciplines.

=== School of Medicine ===
The School offers undergraduate and postgraduate medical education, including medicine and medical specialty programmes.

=== School of Law ===
The School of Law offers undergraduate education in law.

== Academic programmes ==
The university offers 116 academic programmes consisting of:

- 52 undergraduate programmes
- 58 master's programmes
- 6 doctoral (PhD) programmes

These programmes are delivered through 79 academic departments.

== Undergraduate programmes ==
Madda Walabu University offers 52 undergraduate (bachelor's degree) programmes through its colleges and schools.

| College/school | Undergraduate programmes |
|---|---|
| College of Agriculture and Natural Resources | Agricultural Economics; Animal Science; Biodiversity Conservation and Ecotourism; Forestry; Natural Resource Management; Plant Science; Rural Development and Agricultural Extension |
| College of Engineering | Architecture; Civil Engineering; Construction Technology and Management; Electrical and Computer Engineering; Engineering Drawing and Design (Note: Offered through the summer programme.); Mechanical Engineering; Survey Engineering; Water Resources and Irrigation Engineering |
| College of Computing | Computer Science; Information Science; Information Systems; Information Technology |
| College of Natural and Computational Sciences | Biology; Chemistry; Environmental Science; Mathematics; Physics; Sport Science; Statistics |
| College of Medicine and Health Sciences | Medicine; Medical Laboratory Science; Midwifery; Nursing; Pharmacy; Public Health |
| College of Social Sciences and Humanities | Afaan Oromo and Literature; Amharic Language and Literature; Civics and Ethical Education; English Language and Literature; Geography and Environmental Studies; Geographic Information Systems and Land Resource Management; History and Heritage Management; Journalism and Communication; Sociology |
| College of Business and Management | Accounting and Finance; Business Education (Note: Offered through the summer programme.); Economics; Hotel and Tourism Management; Management; Marketing Management |
| College of Education and Behavioural Studies | Early Childhood Care and Education; Educational Planning and Management; Lifelong Learning and Community Development; Psychology |
| School of Law | Law |

== Postgraduate programmes ==
The university offers 64 postgraduate programmes, comprising 58 master's degree programmes and six Doctor of Philosophy (PhD) programmes through its colleges.

| College | Master's programmes | Doctoral programmes |
|---|---|---|
| College of Agriculture and Natural Resources | MSc in Animal Production; MSc in Agronomy; MSc in Plant Pathology; MSc in Watershed Management; MSc in Rural Development; MSc in Ecosystem & Biodiversity Conservation; MSc in Range Ecology and Biodiversity | — |
| College of Engineering | MSc in Mechanical Design; MSc in Hydraulic Engineering; MSc in Manufacturing System Engineering | — |
| College of Computing | MSc in Computer Science; Data Science | — |
| College of Natural and Computational Sciences | MSc in Biology; MSc in Botanical Science; MSc in Applied Microbiology; MSc in Chemistry; MSc in Organic Chemistry; MSc in Analytical Chemistry; MSc in Mathematics (General); MSc in Mathematics (Specialization in Analysis, Differential Equation & Algebra); MSc in Optimization; MSc in Physics (General); MSc in Sport Science; MSc in Football Coaching; MSc in Athletics Coaching; MSc in Physics (Specialization in Quantum Optics, Solid State & Computational); MSc in Environmental Science (Speciality in Natural Management, Sanitation & Pollution, and Atmosphere Physics, Climate Change & Energy) | PhD in Applied Microbiology |
| College of Medicine and Health Sciences | MSc in Public Health Epidemiology; MSc in General Public Health; MSc in Maternity & Reproductive Health; MSc in Reproductive Public Health; MSc in Medical Microbiology; MHP in Health Service Management + GPH & SHC; MSc in Adult Health Nursing; MPH in Public Health Nutrition; Specialty in Gynecology & Obstetrics; Specialty in Surgery | PhD in Public Health |
| College of Social Sciences and Humanities | MA in Applied Linguistics in Teaching Amharic (ALTA); MA in Geography & Environmental Studies; MA in Climate Change & Risk Management; MA in Urban Planning & Management; MA in Civics & Ethical Education; MA in Afan Oromo & Literature; MA in Governance & Development Studies; MA in History & Heritage Studies; MA in Linguistics & Cultural Studies; MA in TEAFL; MSc in GIS & Land Use Planning & Management | PhD in English Language Teaching; PhD in Geography & Environmental Studies |
| College of Business and Management | MA in Developmental Economics; MA in Business Administration; MSc in Accounting & Finance; MA in Marketing Management; MBA in Tourism Hospitality & Management | PhD in Accounting & Finance |
| College of Education and Behavioural Studies | Educational Planning & Management; Curriculum & Teachers' Professional Development; Developmental Psychology; Educational Psychology; Adult Education and Community Development | PhD in Curriculum Design and Development |

== Research ==
The university has identified agriculture, tourism, biodiversity, and health as its principal areas of excellence. Through multidisciplinary research, technology transfer, innovation, and community engagement, it supports regional and national development initiatives.
