= Adama =

City in Oromia Region, Ethiopia

Adama Adaamaa (Oromo) አዳማ (Amharic) Nazareth
- City
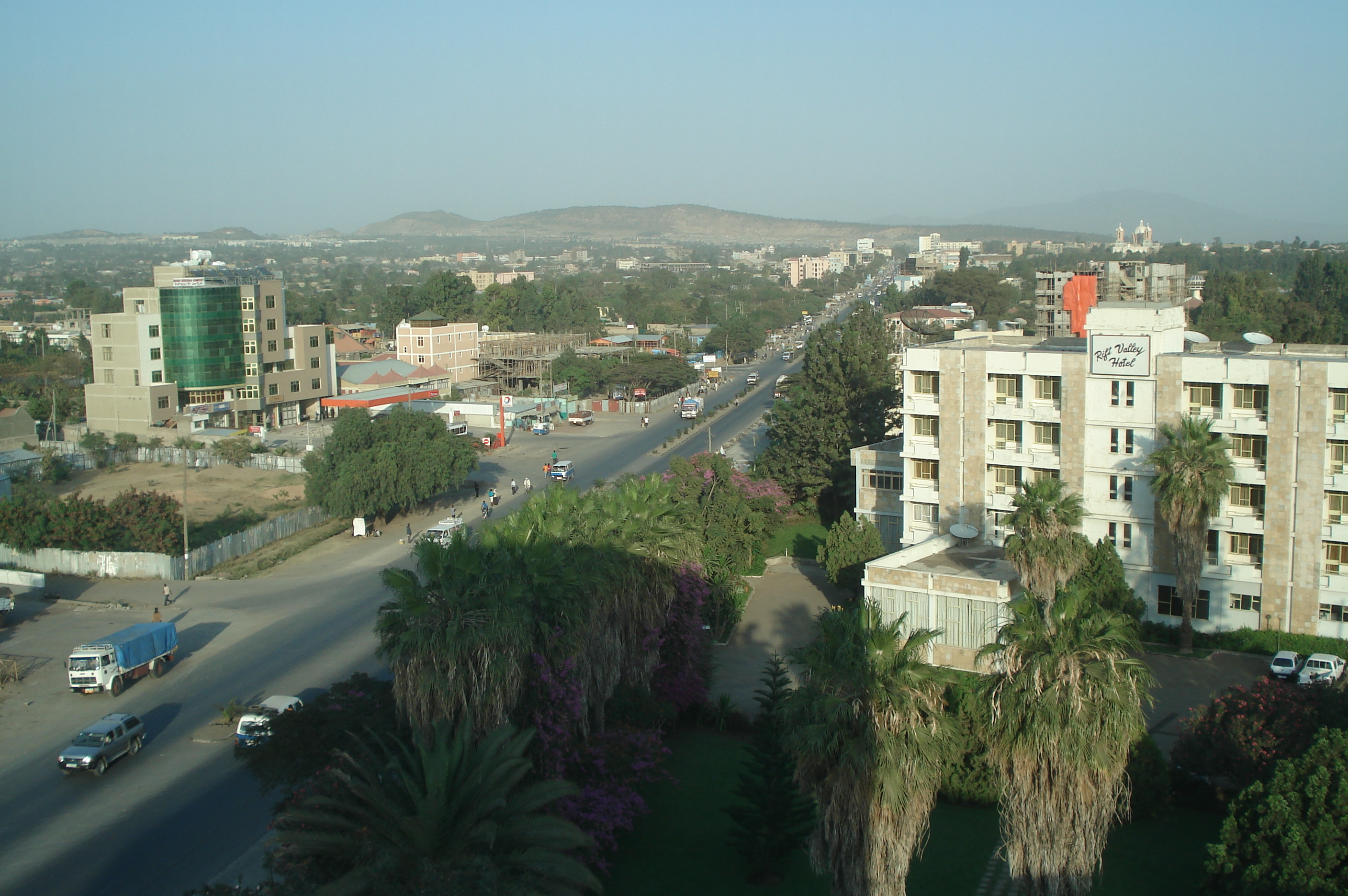
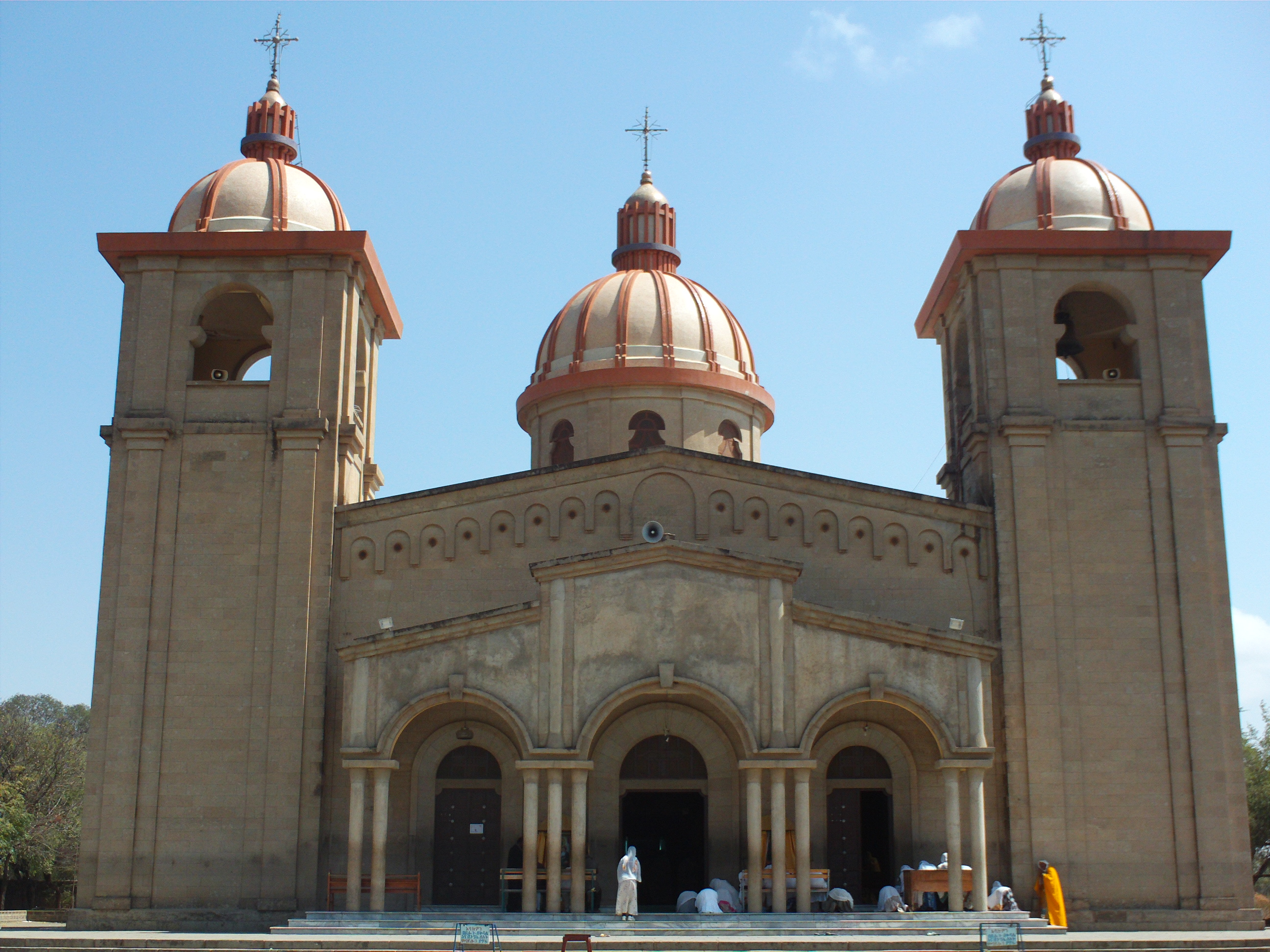
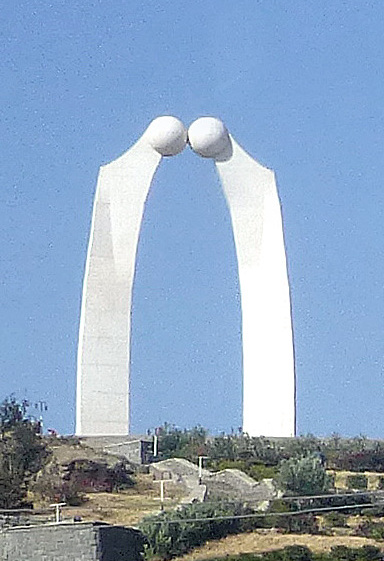
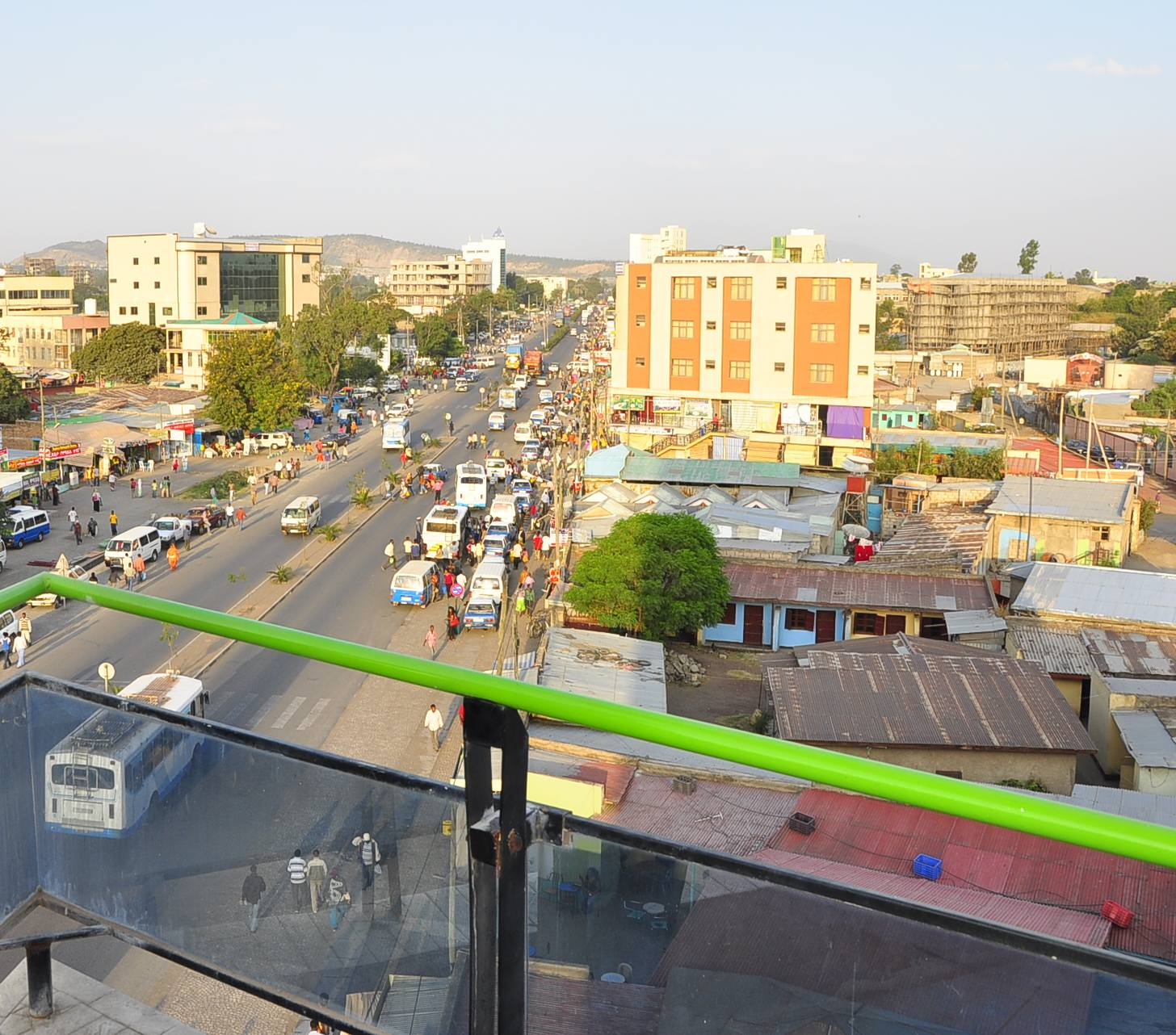
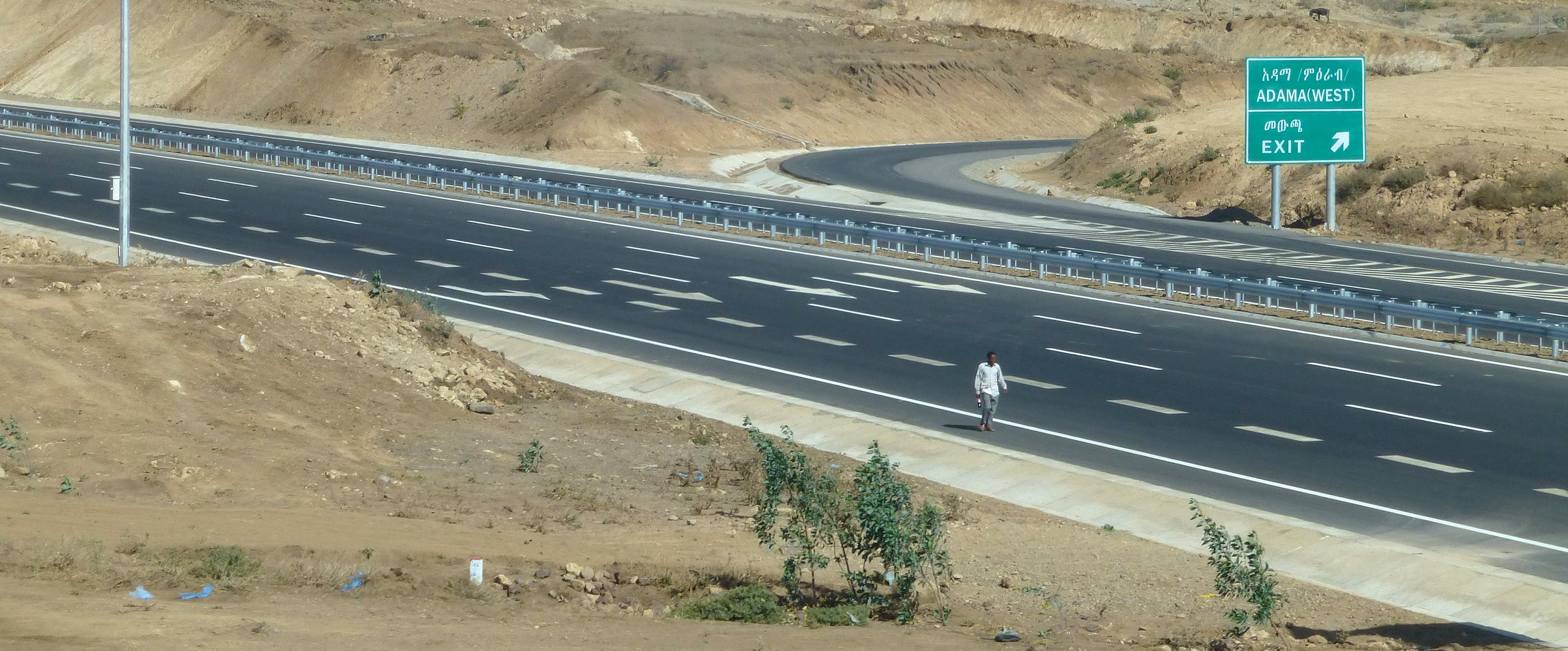
- From top: Addis Ababa-Dire Dawa Road; Saint Mary's Ethiopian Orthodox Church; Oromia Martyrs Monument; Adama City; Addis Ababa–Adama Expressway

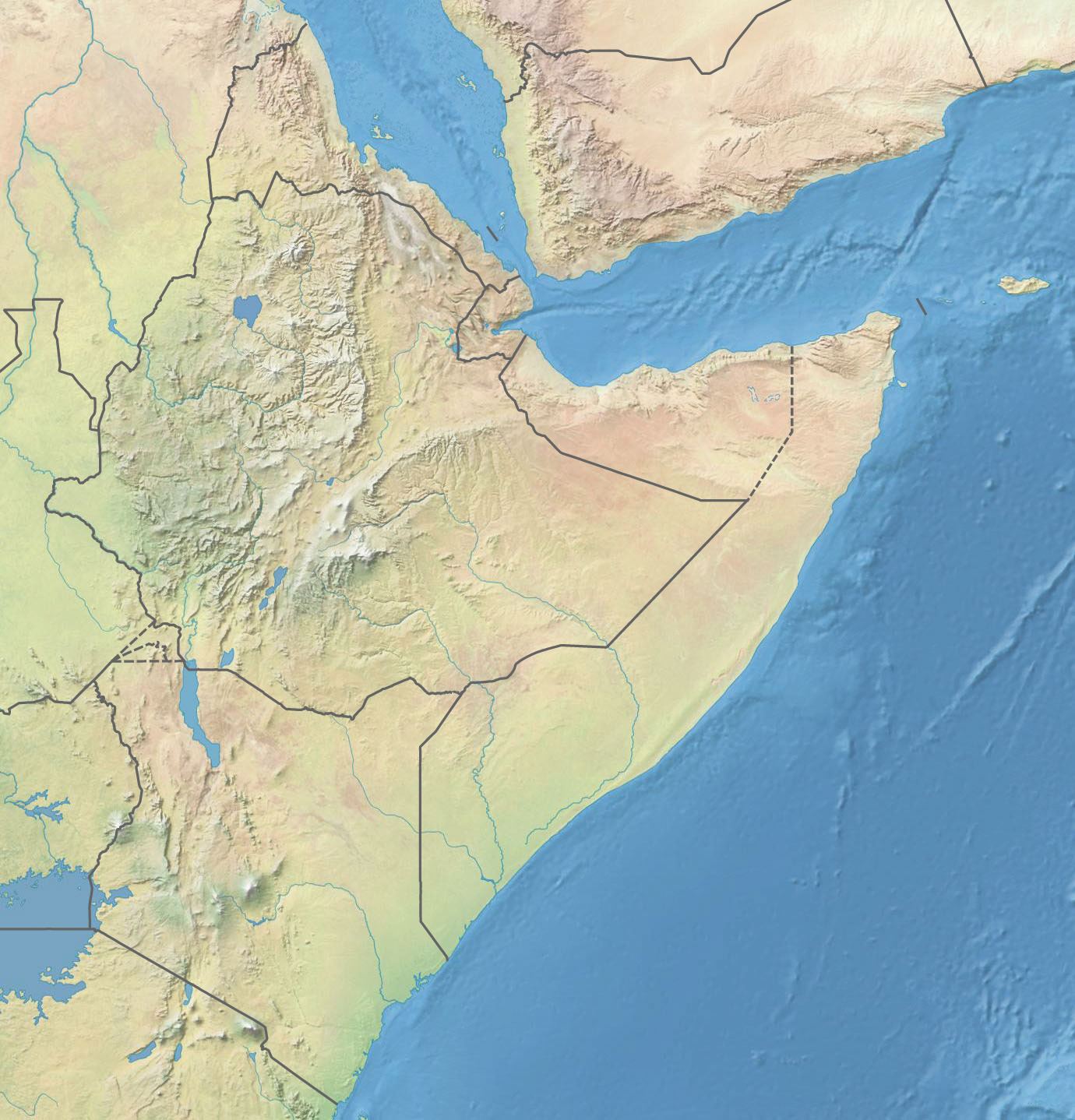
- Location within Ethiopia Location within the Horn of Africa Location within Africa
- Coordinates: 08°32′29″N 39°16′08″E
- Country: Ethiopia
- Region: Oromia
- Zone: East Shewa

Area
  - City: 29.86 km^{2} (11.53 sq mi)
- Elevation: 1,712 m (5,617 ft)

Population (2022)
  - City: 456,868
  - Rank: 4th in Ethiopa; 2nd (Agglomeration)
  - Density: 14,500/km^{2} (38,000/sq mi)
  - Urban: 584,854
- Time zone: UTC+3 (EAT)
- Area code: (+251) 22
- Climate: Aw

Adama (Oromo: Adaamaa, Amharic: አዳማ), formerly Nazret or Nazareth (Amharic: ናዝሬት), is one of the cities of Oromia Region of Ethiopia. Located in the East Shewa Zone 99 km (62 mi) southeast of the capital, Addis Ababa, the city sits between the base of an escarpment to the west, and the Great Rift Valley to the east.

== Overview ==
Adama is a busy transportation center. The city is situated along the road that connects Addis Ababa with Dire Dawa. A large number of trucks use this same route to travel to and from the seaports of Djibouti and Asseb (though the latter is not currently used by Ethiopia, following the Eritrean-Ethiopian War). Additionally, the new Addis Ababa-Djibouti Railway runs through Adama.

Adama Science and Technology University (ASTU) (formerly Nazareth Technique College) is located in Adama. Adama Stadium is the home of Adama City FC, a member of the Ethiopian Football Federation league.

== History ==
The city name Adama may have been derived from the Oromo word adaamii, which means a cactus or a cactus-like tree. More specifically, adaamii means Euphorbia candelabrum, a tree of the spurge family, while hadaamii would mean Indian fig. Following World War II, Emperor Haile Selassie renamed the town after Biblical Nazareth. In 2000, the city officially reverted to Adama.

In 2000, the Federal government moved the regional capital of Oromia from Addis Ababa to Adama, sparking considerable controversy. Critics of the move believed that the Ethiopian government wished to deemphasize Addis Ababa's location within Oromia. On the other hand, the government maintained that Addis Ababa "has been found inconvenient from the point of view of developing the language, culture and history of the Oromo people".

On 10 June 2005, the Oromo Peoples' Democratic Organization (OPDO), part of the ruling EPRDF coalition, officially announced plans to move the regional capital back to Addis Ababa.

== Demographics ==
Ethnic groups of Adama as of 2007
1. Oromo (39.0%)
2. Amhara (34.5%)
3. Gurage (12.0%)
4. Siltʼe (5.02%)
5. Other (9.45%)

Based on the 2007 Census conducted by the Central Statistical Agency of Ethiopia (CSA), this city has a total population of 220,212, an increase of 72.25% over the population recorded in the 1994 census, of whom 108,872 are men and 111,340 women. With an area of 29.86 square kilometers, Adama has a population density of 7,374.82; all are urban inhabitants. A total of 60,174 households were counted in this city, which results in an average of 3.66 persons to a household, and 59,431 housing units. The four largest ethnic groups reported in Adama were the Oromo (39.02%), the Amhara (34.53%), the Gurage (11.98%) and the Silte (5.02%); all other ethnic groups made up 9.45% of the population. Amharic was spoken as a first language by 59.25%, 26.25% spoke Oromo and 6.28% spoke Guragiegna; the remaining 8.22% spoke all other primary languages reported. The majority of the inhabitants said they practiced Ethiopian Orthodox Christianity, with 63.62% of the population reporting they observed this belief, while 24.7% of the population were Muslim, and 10.57% were Protestant.

The 1994 national census reported this town had a total population of 127,842 of whom 61,965 were males and 65,877 were females.

== Transport ==
Adama is a busy transportation center. The city is situated along the road that connects Addis Ababa with Dire Dawa. A large number of trucks use this same route to travel from the nation's capital region to and from the seaports of Djibouti and Asseb (though the latter is not currently used by Ethiopia, following the Eritrean-Ethiopian War). Additionally, the new Addis Ababa-Djibouti Railway runs through Adama.

== Education ==
The Adama University was founded in 1993.

== Places of worship ==
Among the places of worship, they are predominantly found Christian churches and temples (Oriental Orthodox: Ethiopian Orthodox Tewahedo Church, Muslim mosques and madresas; Protestant: Ethiopian Evangelical Church Mekane Yesus, Evangelical Christian: Kale Heywet Word of Life Church, Full Gospel Believers Church, Catholic: Ethiopian Catholic Archeparchy of Addis Abeba).

== Sport ==
Adama Stadium is the home of Adama City FC, a member of the Ethiopian Football Federation league.

== Climate ==
Köppen-Geiger climate classification system classifies its climate as tropical wet and dry (Aw).

Climate data for Adama
Month	Jan	Feb	Mar	Apr	May	Jun	Jul	Aug	Sep	Oct	Nov	Dec	Year
Mean daily maximum °C (°F)	27.3 (81.1)	28.8 (83.8)	29.7 (85.5)	29.8 (85.6)	30.8 (87.4)	29.9 (85.8)	26.3 (79.3)	25.8 (78.4)	27.2 (81.0)	27.8 (82.0)	27.3 (81.1)	26.7 (80.1)	28.1 (82.6)
Mean daily minimum °C (°F)	12.6 (54.7)	14.4 (57.9)	15.0 (59.0)	15.4 (59.7)	16.2 (61.2)	17.2 (63.0)	15.7 (60.3)	15.7 (60.3)	15.1 (59.2)	12.8 (55.0)	12.2 (54.0)	12.0 (53.6)	14.5 (58.2)
Average precipitation mm (inches)	15.4 (0.61)	33.3 (1.31)	56.4 (2.22)	58.1 (2.29)	62.3 (2.45)	58.6 (2.31)	232.8 (9.17)	227.0 (8.94)	100.8 (3.97)	37.4 (1.47)	10.2 (0.40)	8.0 (0.31)	900.3 (35.45)
Average relative humidity (%)	55	54	51	56	54	55	70	70	68	56	55	56	58
Source 1: Ethiopian Meteorological Institute
Source 2: FAO (humidity)

== Twin towns – sister cities ==
Adama is twinned with:

- Aurora, Colorado, United States
- Sivas, Turkey
