= Oromia =

Regional state of Ethiopia

Coordinates: 7°59′21″N 39°22′52″E

Oromia: Oromiyaa (Oromo); ኦሮሚያ (Amharic)
- Regional state
- Flag Seal

- Map of Ethiopia showing Oromia
- Country: Ethiopia
- Official language: Oromo
- Established: 1992
- Capital: Addis Ababa (Note: (claimed; not recognized in federal constitution) Adama (de facto))

Government
  - Chief Administrator: Shimelis Abdisa (Prosperity Party)

Area
  - Total: 353,690 km^{2} (136,560 sq mi)
  - Rank: 1st

Population (2025)
  - Total: 44,597,000
  - Rank: 1st in Ethiopia
  - Density: 100/km^{2} (260/sq mi)
- Demonym: Oromo or Oromian
- Time zone: EAT
- ISO 3166 code: ET-OR
- HDI (2021): 0.482 low · 8th of 11

Oromia (Oromo: Oromiyaa, Amharic: ኦሮሚያ) is a regional state in Ethiopia and the homeland of the Oromo people.

It is bordered by the Somali Region to the east; the Amhara Region, the Afar Region and the Benishangul-Gumuz Region to the north; Dire Dawa to the northeast; the South Sudanese state of Upper Nile, Gambela Region, South West Ethiopia Region, Southern Nations, Nationalities, and Peoples' Region and Sidama Region to the west; the Eastern Province of Kenya to the south; as well as Addis Ababa as an enclave surrounded by a Special Zone in its centre and the Harari Region as an enclave surrounded by East Hararghe in its east.

In August 2013, the Ethiopian Central Statistics Agency projected the 2017 population of Oromia as 35,467,001, making it the largest regional state by population. It is also the largest regional state, covering 353,690 square kilometres (136,560 sq mi).

== History ==
Evidence from Muslim geographers and Ethiopian royal chronicles demonstrates that Oromos were in the Ethiopian Highlands as early as the Middle Ages.

These societies maintained dynamic relations across frontiers—from the Christianized provinces of northern Shewa to the Muslim centers of Harar.

Modern day Shewa was historically divided into three subdivisions: Gerra-Medir, Mamma-Midir, and Lallo-Midir. These names derive from three early rulers—Gerra, Mamma, and Lallo—who governed the region before the rise of the Shewan dynasty. Accounts describe them as Christianized rulers.

Arabic sources from the 13th century describe a region called Gazla, also rendered as Karla or Garla. The Andalusian geographer Ibn Saʿīd al-Maghribī provided one of the earliest known accounts:

"The land of Kazla begins from the equator, neighbouring the Zanj of al-Habasha, and stretches south of Mount Murus, which is said to provide the people of Janbeyta and those regions with gold and silver mines. It lies four days' journey from Janbeyta. To its east and north it extends from there, running eastward and bending northward until it cuts across the Nile of al-Habasha and ends at their sea."

Historians such as Tadeusz Lewicki identified Gazla with the interior highlands of southern Ethiopia, likely inhabited by Cushitic-speaking peoples—possibly early Oromo populations. Its location near the sources of the Nile and south of the Abyssinian kingdom situates it between modern-day Bale, Arsi, and Hararghe. The references to mineral wealth and proximity to trade centers imply that Gazla was a politically organized and economically connected region.

The description of Gazla "cutting across the Nile of al-Habasha and ending at their sea" indicates a geographical span from the Ethiopian interior to the Indian Ocean coast. This aligns with evidence for early trade routes linking the Ethiopian plateau with ports such as Mogadishu, Marka, and Brava, suggesting that Gazla served as a key corridor of cultural and commercial exchange between the interior and the Zanj coast.

In medieval Ethiopian Christian literature, the term Arämi (አራሚ) was used to denote pagans, non-Christians, or infidels. It was especially applied to non-Christian Oromo groups and to Muslims living along the southern frontier of the Christian kingdom. The term could also function interchangeably with Tanbalat for Muslims, and in some cases was even extended to other foreigners.

A miracle of Saint Täklä Haymanot, edited by Getatchew Haile (1984), refers to "the seven regions of the Arämi (Muslims)", which parallels the seven Islamic provinces mentioned by Arabic writers concerning the early Kingdom of Ifat.

This linguistic and historical correspondence suggests that the Arämi of Ethiopian chronicles and the Gazla of Arabic geography refer to overlapping frontier zones — multi-religious regions where Oromo, Harla, Somali, and other Cushitic peoples interacted with both Christian and Muslim influences.

The Oromo remained independent until the last quarter of the 19th century, when they lost their sovereignty. From 1881 to 1886, Emperor Menelik II conducted several unsuccessful invasion campaigns against their territory. The Arsi Oromo demonstrated fierce resistance against this Abyssinian conquest, putting up stiff opposition against an enemy equipped with modern European firearms. They were ultimately defeated in 1886.

In the 1940s some Arsi Oromo together with people from Bale province joined the Harari Kulub movement, an affiliate of the Somali Youth League that opposed Amhara Christian domination of Hararghe. The Ethiopian government violently suppressed these ethno-religious movements. During the 1970s the Arsi formed alliances with Somalia.

In 1967, the imperial regime of Haile Selassie I outlawed the Mecha and Tulama Self-Help Association (MTSHA), an Oromo social movement, and conducted mass arrests and executions of its members. The group's leader, Colonel General Tadesse Birru, who was a prominent military officer, was among those arrested. The actions by the regime sparked outrage among the Oromo community, ultimately leading to the formation of the Oromo Liberation Front in 1973. The Oromos perceived the rule of Emperor Haile Selassie as oppressive, as the Oromo language was banned from education and use in administration, and speakers were privately and publicly mocked. The Amhara culture dominated throughout the eras of military and monarchic rule.

Both the imperial and the Derg government relocated numerous Amharas into southern Ethiopia, including the present day Oromia region, in order to alleviate drought in the north of the country. They also served in government administration, courts, church and even in school, where Oromo texts were eliminated and replaced by Amharic. Further disruption under the Derg regime came through the forced concentration and resettlement of peasant communities in fewer villages. The Abyssinian elites perceived the Oromo identity and languages as opposing the expansion of an Ethiopian national identity.

In the early 1990s, the Ethiopian Democratic People's Republic began to lose its control over Ethiopia. The OLF failed to maintain strong alliances with the other two rebel groups at the time: the Eritrean People's Liberation Front (EPLF) and the Tigray People's Liberation Front (TPLF). In 1990, the TPLF created an umbrella organization for several rebel groups in Ethiopia, the Ethiopian People's Revolutionary Democratic Front (EPRDF). The EPRDF's Oromo subordinate, the Oromo People's Democratic Organization (OPDO) was seen as an attempted replacement for the OLF.

On 28 May 1991, the EPRDF seized power and established a transitional government. The EPRDF and the OLF pledged to work together in the new government; however, they were largely unable to cooperate, as the OLF saw the OPDO as an EPRDF ploy to limit their influence. In 1992, the OLF announced that it was withdrawing from the transitional government because of "harassment and [the]assassinations of its members". In response, the EPRDF sent soldiers to destroy OLA camps. Despite initial victories against the EPRDF, the OLF were eventually overwhelmed by the EPRDF's superior numbers and weaponry, forcing OLA soldiers to use guerrilla warfare instead of traditional tactics. In the late 1990s, most of the OLF's leaders had escaped Ethiopia, and the land originally administered by the OLF had been seized by the Ethiopian government, now led by the EPRDF.

Prior to the establishment of present-day Addis Ababa the location was called Finfinne in Oromo, a name which refers to the presence of hot springs. The area was previously inhabited by various Oromo clans.

In 2000, Oromia's capital was moved from Addis Ababa to Adama. Because this move sparked considerable controversy and protests among Oromo students, the Oromo Peoples' Democratic Organization (OPDO), part of the ruling EPRDF coalition, on 10 June 2005, officially announced plans to move the regional capital back to Addis Ababa.

Further protests sparked on 25 April 2014, against the Addis Ababa Master Plan, then resumed on 12 September 2015 and continued into 2016, when renewed protests broke out across Ethiopia, centering around the Oromia region. Dozens of protesters were killed in the first days of the protests and internet service was cut in many parts of the region. In 2019, the Irreecha festival was celebrated in Addis Ababa after 150 years of being banned.

== Geography ==
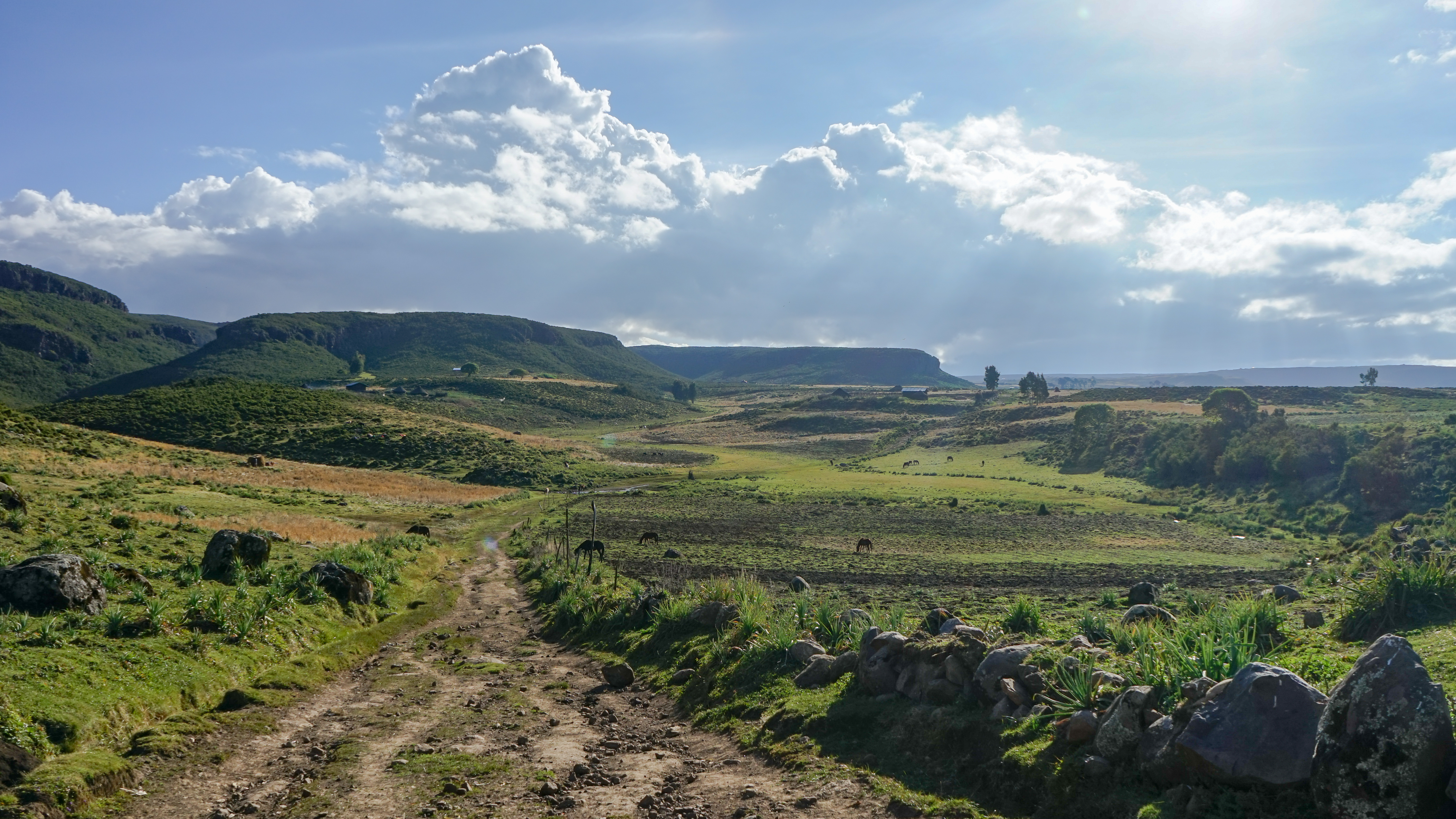
Vegetations in Bale Mountains National Park

Oromia includes the former Arsi Province along with portions of the former Bale, Illubabor, Kaffa, Shewa and Sidamo provinces. Oromia shares a boundary with almost every region of Ethiopia except for the Tigray Region. These boundaries have been disputed in a number of cases, most notably between Oromia and the Somali Region. One attempt to resolve the dispute between the two regions was the October 2004 referendum held in about 420 kebeles in 12 districts across five zones of the Somali Region. According to the official results of the referendum, about 80% of the disputed areas have fallen under Oromia administration, though there were allegations of voting irregularities in many of them. The results led over the following weeks to minorities in these kebeles being pressured to leave. In Oromiya, estimates based on figures given by local district and kebele authorities suggest that 21,520 people have become internally displaced persons (IDPs) in border districts, namely Mieso, Doba, and Erer in the West Hararghe Zone and East Hararghe Zones. Federal authorities believe that this number may be overstated by as much as 11,000. In Doba, the Ministry of Federal Affairs put the number of IDPs at 6,000. There are also more than 2,500 displaced persons in Mieso. In addition, there were reports of people being displaced in the border area of Moyale and Borena zones due to this conflict.

Towns in the region include Adama, Ambo, Asella, Badessa, Bale Robe, Bedele, Bishoftu, Begi, Bule Hora, Burayu, Chiro, Dembidolo, Fiche, Gimbi, Goba, Haramaya, Holeta, Jimma, Koye Feche, Metu, Negele Arsi, Nekemte, Sebeta, Shashamane and Waliso, among many others.

== Demographics ==
Historical population
Year	Pop.	±%
1994	18,732,525	—
2007	26,993,933	+44.1%
2015	33,692,000	+24.8%

At the time of the 2007 census conducted by the Central Statistical Agency of Ethiopia (CSA), Oromia region had a total population of 26,993,933, consisting of 13,595,006 men and 13,398,927 women; urban inhabitants numbered 3,317,460 or 11.3% of the population. With an estimated area of 353,006.81 square kilometres (136,296.69 sq mi), the region had an estimated population density of 76.93 inhabitants per square kilometre (199.2/sq mi). For the entire region 5,590,530 households were counted, which resulted in an average for the region of 4.8 persons to a household, with urban households having on average 3.8 and rural households 5.0 people. The projected population for 2017 was 35,467,001.

In the previous census, conducted in 1994, the region's population was reported to be 17,088,136; urban inhabitants number 621,210 or 14% of the population.

According to the CSA, as of 2004, 32% of the population had access to safe drinking water, of whom 23.7% were rural inhabitants and 91.03% were urban. Values for other reported common indicators of the standard of living for Oromia as of 2005 include the following: 19.9% of the inhabitants fall into the lowest wealth quintile; adult literacy for men is 61.5% and for women 29.5%; and the regional infant mortality rate is 76 infant deaths per 1,000 live births, which is about the same as the nationwide average of 77; at least half of these deaths occurred in the infants' first month of life.

=== Ethnic groups ===
Ethnic group	1994 Census		2007 Census	
Oromo	15,709,474	85%	23,708,767	88%
Amhara	1,684,128	9%	1,943,578	7%
Other ethnic groups	1,080,218	6%	1,341,588	5%
Total population	18,473,820		26,993,933	

=== Religion ===
Religion (entire region)	1994 Census		2007 Census	
Muslim	8,178,058	44%	12,835,410	48%
Orthodox Christians	7,621,727	41%	8,204,908	30%
Protestant Christians	1,588,310	9%	4,780,917	18%
Waaqeffanna	778,359	4%	887,773	3%
other religious groups	307,366	2%	284,925	1%
Total population	18,473,820		26,993,933	

Religion (urban areas)	1994 Census		2007 Census	
Orthodox Christians	1,330,301	68%	1,697,495	51%
Muslim	471,462	24%	990,109	30%
Protestant Christians	137070	7%	580,562	18%
other religious groups	23,971	1%	49,294	1%
Total population	1,962,804		3,317,460	

=== Languages ===
Oromo is written with Latin characters known as Qubee, only formally adopted in 1991 after various other Latin-based orthographies had been used previously.

Oromo is one of the official working languages of Ethiopia and is also the working language of several of the states within the Ethiopian federal system including Oromia, Harari and Dire Dawa regional states and of the Oromia Zone in the Amhara Region. It is a language of primary education in Oromia, Harari and of the Oromia Zone in the Amhara Region. It is used as an internet language for federal websites along with Tigrinya.

There are more than 33.8% Oromo speakers in Ethiopia and it is considered the most widely spoken language in Ethiopia. It is also the most widely spoken Cushitic language and the fourth-most widely spoken language of Africa, after Arabic, Hausa and Swahili languages. Forms of Oromo are spoken as a first language by more than 35 million Oromo people in Ethiopia and by an additional half-million in parts of northern and eastern Kenya. It is also spoken by smaller numbers of emigrants in other African countries such as South Africa, Libya, Egypt and Sudan. Besides first language speakers, a number of members of other ethnicities who are in contact with the Oromo speak it as a second language. See, for example, Harari, Omotic-speaking Bambassi and the Nilo-Saharan-speaking Kwama in northwestern, eastern and south Oromia.

== Economy ==
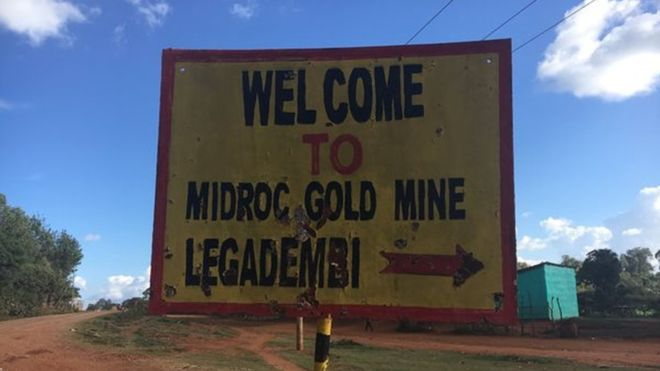
The road to Lega Dembi gold mine

Oromia is a major contributor to Ethiopia's main exports - gold, coffee, khat and cattle. Lega Dembi in Guji Zone, owned by MIDROC has exported more than 5000 kilograms of gold, followed by Tulu Kapi gold deposit in West Welega Zone. Awoday in East Hararghe Zone is the biggest market of khat exporting to Djibouti and Somalia. Oromia also has more abundant livestock than any other region of Ethiopia, including camels. It is also the largest producer of cereals and coffee.

The CSA reported that, from 2004 to 2005, 115,083 tons of coffee were produced in Oromia, based on inspection records from the Ethiopian Coffee and Tea Authority. This represents 50.7% of the total production in Ethiopia. Farmers in the Region had an estimated total of 17,214,540 cattle (representing 44.4% of Ethiopia's total cattle), 6,905,370 sheep (39.6), 4,849,060 goats (37.4%), 959,710 horses (63.25%), 63,460 mules (43.1%), 278,440 asses (11.1%), 139,830 camels (30.6%), 11,637,070 poultry of all species (37.7%), and 2,513,790 beehives (57.73%).

According to a March 2003 World Bank publication, the average rural household has 1.14 hectares of land compared to the national average of 1.01 hectares. 24% of the population work in non-farm related jobs compared to the national average of 25%.

== Educational institutions ==
- Adama University
- Ambo University
- Arsi University
- Dambi Dollo University
- Dandii Boruu University College
- Haramaya University
- Jimma Teachers College
- Jimma University
- Madda Walabu University
- Mattu University
- New Generation University College
- Oda Bultum University
- Oromia State University
- Rift Valley University College
- Wollega University
- Awash Valley University

== List of Chief Administrators of Oromia Region ==
Tenure	Portrait	Incumbent	Affiliation	Notes
1992–1995		Hassen Ali	OPDO	
1995 – 24 July 2001		Kuma Demeksa	OPDO	
July 2001 – October 2001		Position vacant		
28 October 2001 – 6 October 2005		Junedin Sado	OPDO	
6 October 2005 – September 2010		Abadula Gemeda	OPDO	
September 2010 – 17 February 2014		Alemayehu Atomsa	OPDO	
27 March 2014 – 23 October 2016		Muktar Kedir	OPDO	
23 October 2016 – 18 April 2019		Lemma Megersa	OPDO/ODP	
18 April 2019 – present		Shimelis Abdisa	ODP/PP	

== Administrative zones ==
Map of the regions and zones of Ethiopia

Oromia is subdivided into 21 administrative zones, in turn divided into districts (weredas).

Zones of Oromia and their administrative capitals
Number	Zone	Area in km^{2}	Population estimate 2022	Administrative capital
1	Arsi Zone	19,825.22	3,894,248	Asela
2	Bale Zone	43,690.56	2,073,381	Bale Robe
3	Borena Zone	45,434.97	1,402,530	Yabelo
4	Buno Bedele Zone			Bedele
5	East Borana Zone			Negele Borana
6	East Hararghe Zone	17,935.40	3,954,416	Harar
7	East Shewa Zone	8,370.90	2,126,152	Adama
8	East Welega Zone	12,579.77	1,806,001	Nekemte
9	Guji Zone	18,577.05	2,030,667	Negele Borana
10	Horo Guduru Welega Zone	8,097.27	840,709	Shambu
11	Illu Aba Bora Zone	15,135.33	1,861,919	Metu
12	Jimma Zone	15,568.58	3,568,782	Jimma
13	Kelam Welega Zone	9,851.17	1,166,694	Dembidolo
14	North Shewa Zone	10,332,48	2,100,331	Fiche
15	Southwest Shewa Zone	6,508.29	1,640,751	Waliso
16	West Arsi Zone	11,776.72	2,929,894	Shashamane
17	West Guji Zone			Bule Hora
18	West Hararghe Zone	15,065.86	2,725,156	Chiro
19	West Shewa Zone	14,788.78	3,042,005	Ambo
20	West Welega Zone	10,833.19	1,987,182	Gimbi
21	Oromia Special Zone Surrounding Finfinne			Finfinne

== See also ==
- Barchaa, cultural custom and social relations
