= Adama Science and Technology University =

Public research university in Adama, Oromia Region, Ethiopia

Adama Science & Technology University
- Type: Public
- Established: 1993 (college); 2005 (science and technology university)
- President: Miftah Shifera
- Students: 200 (Science); 1080 (Engineering)
- Location: Adama, Oromia Region, Ethiopia; 8.5644743°N 39.29208°E
- Campus: Urban
- Language: English
- Website: www.astu.edu.et

Adama Science and Technology University (ASTU) is a public university first established in 1993 as Nazareth Technical College (NTC) and one of the two Science And Technology Universities of Ethiopia. It is located in Adama, a city in the Oromia Region, Ethiopia.

== Entrepreneurship Development Center (ASTU-EDC) ==
ASTU-EDC, or the Entrepreneurship Development Center of Adama Science and Technology University, is a center that supports entrepreneurship and innovation in Ethiopia. It offers business incubation and technology transfer services to students, innovators, and small and medium enterprises (SMEs) in various fields of science and technology. The center's mission is to foster a culture of entrepreneurship in the university and the community and to help create and grow businesses that can address the social and economic challenges of the country. ASTU-EDC was established in 2012 as part of the Ethiopian Entrepreneurship Development Program, a national initiative funded by the Ministry of Education and the United Nations Development Program (UNDP). Since then, ASTU-EDC has served more than 3,000 individuals through its training and incubation programs. It has helped four teams win the National Business Competitions: Halib Toothpaste, Green Ethiopia, BamGo, and SOZO Team. The center was led by Mr. Solomon Dufera Tolcha. source: the former Adama University

== Sports ==
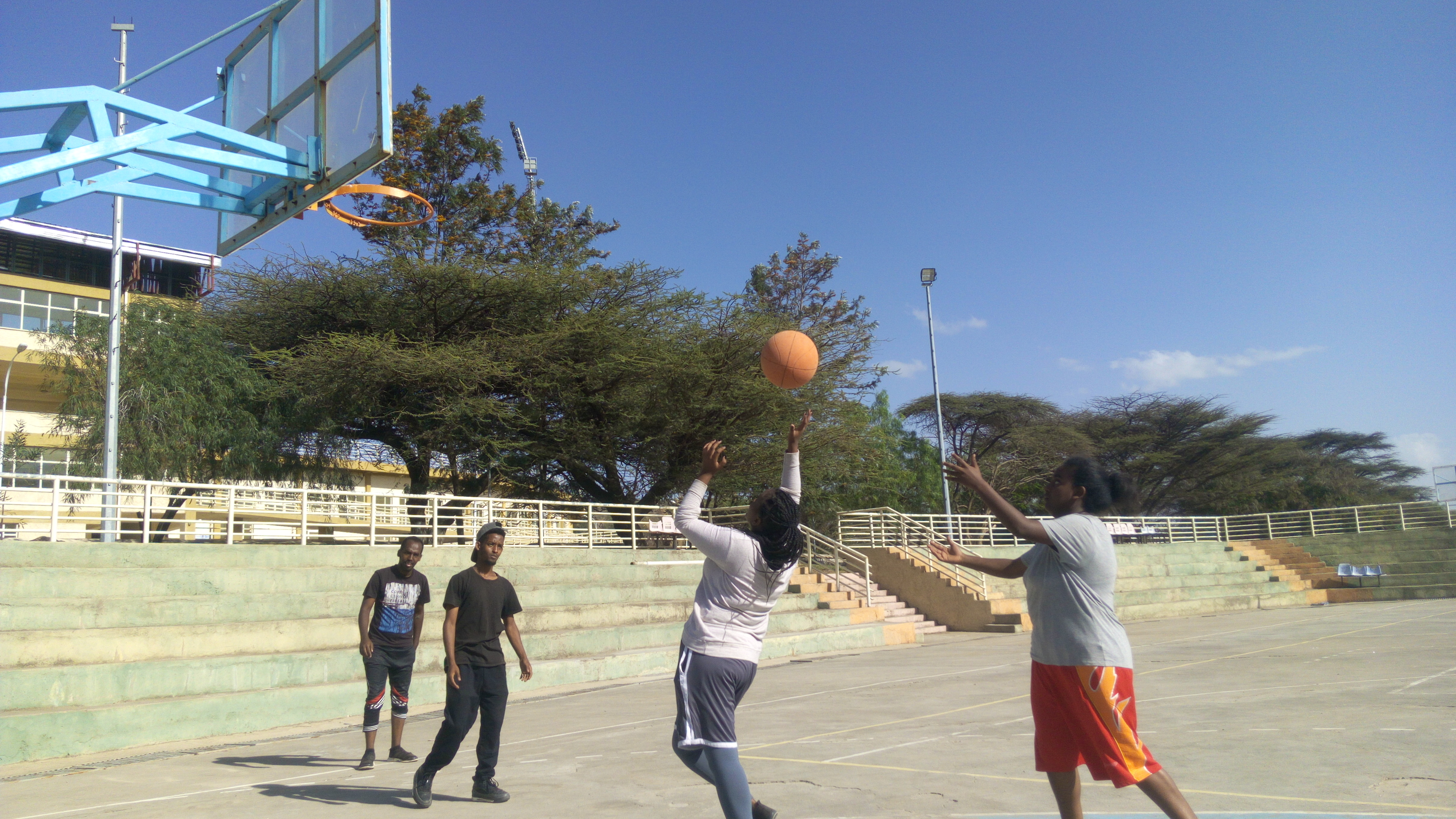
Playing basketball in ASTU.

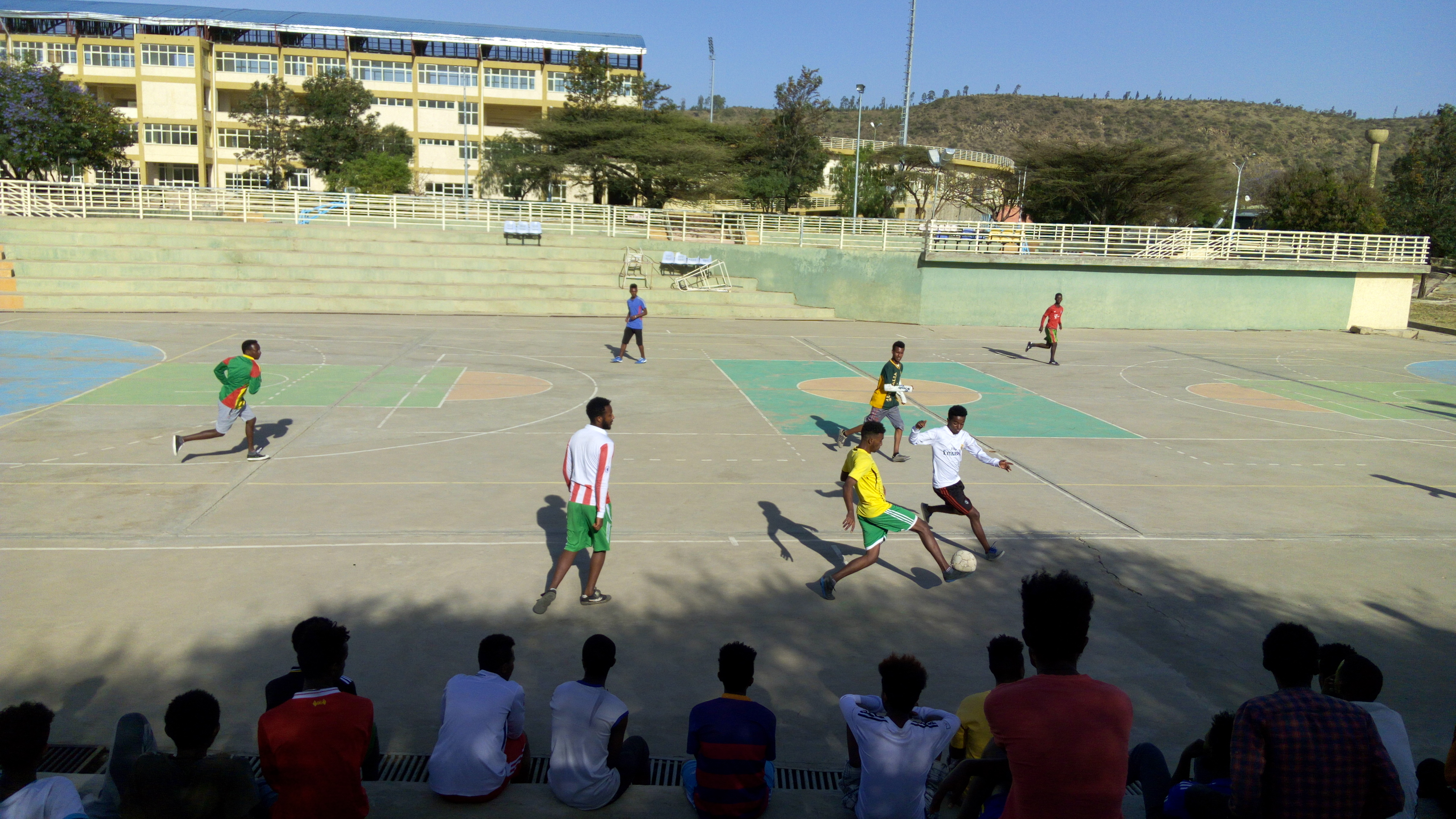
Playing football in ASTU.

== See also ==
- List of universities and colleges in Ethiopia
- Education in Ethiopia
