= Asella =

Town in Oromia Region, Ethiopia

አሰላ Asallaa
- Town
- Asella
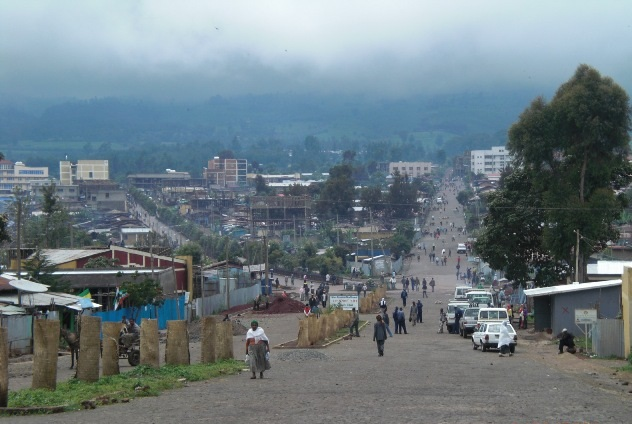
- Asella in Ethiopia

- Location within Ethiopia አሰላ (Africa)
- Coordinates: 7°57′N 39°7′E
- Country: Ethiopia
- Region: (Oromia Region) Oromia
- Zone: Arsi

Area
  - Total: 16.98 km^{2} (6.56 sq mi)
- Elevation: 2,430 m (7,970 ft)

Population (2007 Census)
  - Total: 67,269
  - Estimate (mid 2022): 139,537
  - Density: 8,217.6/km^{2} (21,283/sq mi)
- Time zone: UTC+3 (EAT)
- Climate: Cwb

Asella (Oromo: Asallaa, Amharic: አሰላ) is a town in central Ethiopia. Located in the Arsi Zone of the Oromia Region 156 km (97 mi) south from Addis Ababa, this town has a latitude and longitude of 7°57′N 39°7′E, with an elevation of 2,430 meters. Asella hosts an Asella Airport (IATA code ALK). Asalla was the capital of Arsi Province until that province was demoted to a Zone of Oromia with the adoption of the 1995 Constitution. It retains some administrative functions as the seat of the present Arsi Zone.

== History ==
Asalla town got its start before the Second Italian-Abyssinian War. The Italian occupiers wanted to make Asela into a provincial capital, but they were unable to build more than one two-story building and some warehouses of masonry. The 6th brigade and two companies of the 5th brigade of the King's African Rifles captured Asella on 10 April 1941, after pursuing General De Simone south from Dire Dawa and forcing their way past the Awash River and a dug-in Italian position. Brigade headquarters were afterwards set up in the town.

In 1946, a Swedish Mission laid the foundations for a hospital and a school in Asella, which was ordered closed in 1966 when a government hospital was built. The town was subjected to a serious epidemic of dysentery during 1953, and a locust invasion in April 1961. In 1957, Asella was the southern end of the national telephone network, and by 1960, Asella had one of the ten municipal slaughter houses in Ethiopia; further, that year, a branch of the Ethiopian Electric Light and Power Authority had begun operation in the town.

Asella has been the home of many long-distance runners, including Haile Gebrselassie, Kenenisa Bekele, Tirunesh Dibaba, and Derartu Tulu. The Arsi University was established in Asella in 2015.

== Demographics ==
The 2007 national census reported a total population for Asella of 67,269, of whom 33,826 were male and 33,443 were female. The majority of the inhabitants said they practiced Ethiopian Orthodox Christianity, with 67.42% of the population reporting they observed this belief, while 22.59% of the population were Muslim, and 8.75% of the population were Protestant. The official estimate of population for mid 2022 produced a total of 139,537 inhabitants, of whom 69,459 were male and 70,078 were female.

The 1994 national census reported this town had a total population of 47,391 of whom 21,993 were males and 25,398 were females.

== Climate ==
In the Köppen-Geiger climate classification system, Asella is categorised as having a subtropical highland climate (Cwb). Monthly temperature variation is low, due to its elevation and closeness to the equator. The seasons are only distinguished by the intensity of rain, which is highest in August and lowest in December.

Climate data for Asella (Kulumsa)
Month	Jan	Feb	Mar	Apr	May	Jun	Jul	Aug	Sep	Oct	Nov	Dec	Year
Mean daily maximum °C (°F)	22.7 (72.9)	23.7 (74.7)	24.6 (76.3)	24.7 (76.5)	24.3 (75.7)	23.2 (73.8)	21.2 (70.2)	21.0 (69.8)	21.3 (70.3)	23.0 (73.4)	22.6 (72.7)	22.6 (72.7)	22.9 (73.3)
Daily mean °C (°F)	15.5 (59.9)	16.5 (61.7)	17.7 (63.9)	18.3 (64.9)	18.2 (64.8)	17.2 (63.0)	16.2 (61.2)	16.0 (60.8)	16.1 (61.0)	16.7 (62.1)	15.8 (60.4)	15.1 (59.2)	16.6 (61.9)
Mean daily minimum °C (°F)	8.1 (46.6)	9.1 (48.4)	10.8 (51.4)	12.0 (53.6)	12.1 (53.8)	11.1 (52.0)	11.1 (52.0)	11.0 (51.8)	10.6 (51.1)	10.6 (51.1)	9.0 (48.2)	7.5 (45.5)	10.2 (50.5)
Average precipitation mm (inches)	19 (0.7)	67 (2.6)	86 (3.4)	120 (4.7)	82 (3.2)	90 (3.5)	122 (4.8)	135 (5.3)	107 (4.2)	38 (1.5)	11 (0.4)	9 (0.4)	886 (34.7)
Source: FAO

== Notable people ==
- Zemzem Ahmed (Runner)
- Mohammed Aman (Runner)
- Sisay Bezabeh (Runner)
- Abreham Cherkos (Runner)
- Haile Gebrselassie (Runner)
- Lamecha Girma (Runner)
- Andualem Negusse (Footballer)

== Media organizations ==
- FBC, Fana Broadcasting Corporation S.C., Radio Station at Asella Fana FM 90.0
