= Ministry of Education (Ethiopia) =

Government ministry of Ethiopia

- ትምህርት ሚኒሰቴር

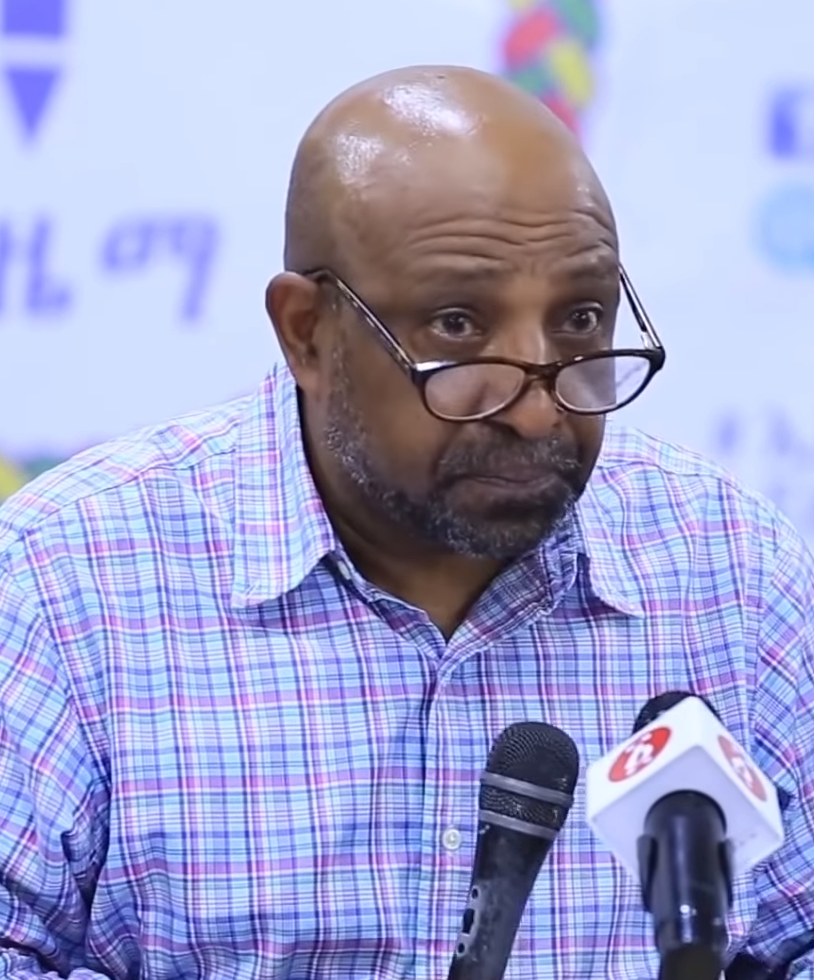
- Incumbent; Berhanu Nega since 6 October 2021
- Type: Governmental department
- Abbreviation: MoE
- Formation: 1930
- Salary: 2,462,752.06 Ethiopian Birr per year
- Website: Official website

The Ministry of Education (Amharic: ትምህርት ሚኒሰቴር) is an Ethiopian government department responsible for the governance and policies of education. It is headquartered in Arada Sub-City, Addis Ababa. It is responsible for overseeing the teaching and learning process throughout the country from elementary school education to higher secondary school education. It regulates the general curriculum of public schools and also sets the precedent for private schools. The department also has, in accord with Ethiopian law, the authority to regulate all institutions of learning to a certain limited extent.

== History ==
The Ministry of Education established during the reign of Emperor Haile Selassie in 1930 under Blattengetta Sahlu Sedalu, a former graduate of the Menelik II School. The First Secretary of the Ministry was Ato Kidina Mariam Aberra. The Ministry was then allotted 2 per cent of the treasury's revenue, in addition to a special education tax.

During the Abiy Ahmed prime ministership of Ethiopia, Getahun Mekuria was Minister of Education prior to October 2021, when Berhanu Nega became Minister. On 6 October 2021, as part of this Cabinet reshuffle, the Ministry of Science and Higher Education (MoSHE), which was established two years prior on 16 August 2018, was dissolved and merged into the Ministry of Education.

== See also ==
- National Educational Assessment and Examination Agency
