= List of schools in Ethiopia =

This is a list of notable secondary schools in Ethiopia.

== Addis Ababa ==
- Atlas School
- Ayer Tena Secondary School
- Bashewam School
- Bingham Academy
- Cistercian Monastery
- Dandii Boru School
- Dejazmach Wondirad School
- Diamond Academy
- Ethio-Parents' School
- German Church School
- German Embassy School Addis Ababa
- International Community School of Addis Ababa (formerly American Community School)
- Istituto Statale Italiano Omnicomprensivo di Addis Abeba
- KB Academy
- Lideta Catholic Cathedral School
- Lycée Guebre-Mariam
- Menelik II School
- One Planet International School
- School of Tomorrow
- St John Baptist De La Salle Catholic School, Addis Ababa
- St. Joseph's School
- Teferi Mekonnen School
- Zagol Academy

== Wolayita ==
- Bilate Tena Secondary and Preparatory School, Dimtu
- Bogale Walelu Secondary and Preparatory School
- Wolaita Liqa School

== Other areas ==
- Addis Alem Senior Secondary School, Addis Alem, Oromia Region
- Tewodros II Secondary School, Debre Tabor
- Yemane Senior Secondary School, Gulomakeda

== See also ==
- Education in Ethiopia
- List of schools by country
- List of universities and colleges in Ethiopia
