= German School Bucharest =

The German School Bucharest, or of Bucharest, may refer to:

- Deutsche Schule Bukarest (est. 2007) – German-language international school
- German Goethe College Bucharest (est. 1752) – Bucharest's historical German school; see Deutsches Goethe-Kolleg Bukarest and Colegiul German Goethe

== See also ==
- German School
- German Embassy School (disambiguation)
- German International School (disambiguation)
