= German International School =

German International School may refer to:

- German International School Abu Dhabi
- German International School Boston
- German International School of Cairo
- German International School Cape Town
- German International School Chennai
- German International School Doha
- German International School Dubai
- German International School Jakarta
- German International School New York
- German International School Portland
- German International School Sharjah
- German International School of Silicon Valley
- German International School Sydney
- German International School of The Hague
- German International School Toronto
- German International School Washington D.C.
- German School Seoul International
- International German School of Brussels
- International German School Ho Chi Minh City

== See also ==
- Deutsche Schule der Borromäerinnen (disambiguation)
- German Embassy School (disambiguation)
- German School (disambiguation)
