= List of international schools in Addis Ababa =

This is the list of international schools located in Addis Ababa, Ethiopia.

== List ==
- Good Beginnings Daycare and Preschool
- International Community School of Addis Ababa
- Sandford International School
- One Planet International School
- British International School Ethiopia
- Andinet International School
- Bingham Academy
- Lycée Guebre-Mariam
- German Embassy School Addis Ababa
- Kelem International School
- Zagol Academy
- Bright Future School
- Gibson School Systems
- Ethio Parent School
