= Education in Ethiopia =

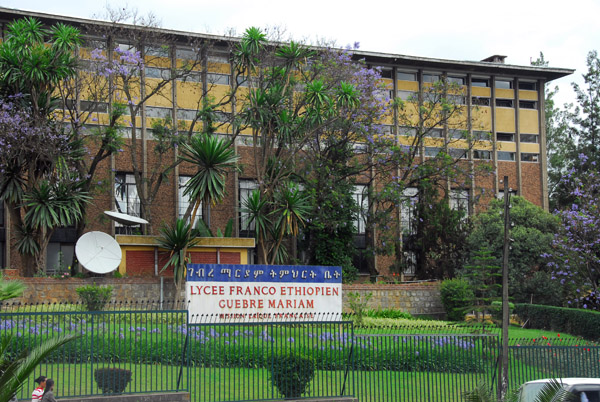
Lycée Guebre-Mariam, the French international school in Addis Ababa

Education in Ethiopia was dominated by the Ethiopian Orthodox Church for many centuries until secular education was adopted in the early 1900s. Prior to 1974, Ethiopia had an estimated literacy rate below 50% and compared poorly with the rest of even Africa in the provision of schools and universities. After the Ethiopian Revolution, emphasis was placed on increasing literacy in rural areas. Practical subjects were stressed, as was the teaching of socialism. By 2015, the literacy rate had increased to 49.1%, still poor compared to most of the rest of Africa.

Recently, there has been massive expansion throughout the educational system. Access to primary schools is limited to urban locations, where they are mostly private-sector or faith-based organizations.

Formal education consists of in total 12 grades. Primary school education consists of two cycles: grades 1 to 4 and 5 to 8. Secondary schools also have two cycles: grades 9 to 10 and 11 to 12. Primary schools have over 90% of 7-year-olds enrolled although only about half complete both cycles. This situation varies from one region to the other, being lower in agro-pastoral locations (such as Somali and Afar regions) and the growing regions such as Gambela and Benshangul Gumuz.

A much smaller proportion of children attend secondary school and even fewer attend its second cycle. School attendance is lowest in rural areas due to lack of provision and the presence of alternative occupations. In later grades the secondary curriculum covers more subjects at a higher level than curricula in most other countries. Low pay and undervaluation of teachers contributes to poor quality teaching, exacerbated by large class sizes and poor resources—resulting in poor performance in national assessments. There is also evidence of corruption including forgery of certificates.

Many primary schools have introduced mother-tongue teaching but face difficulties where small minority languages are concerned. Girls' access to education has been improved but early marriage decreases their attendance. Girls' educational attainment is adversely affected by gender stereotypes, violence, lack of sanitary facilities and the consequences of sexual activity.

Jimma University is addressing some problems women experience in higher education. Technical and vocational education and training (TVET) institutes have introduced competence-based assessments although many lack adequate resources. Teacher training has been up-graded. All higher education has been expanding in enrollment but without comparable expansion in staffing and resources. There have been difficulties in introducing business process re-engineering (BPR) with poorly paid university staff supplementing their incomes where possible. Universities need to match training to market demands. All colleges and universities suffer from the same disadvantages as schools. Library facilities are poor, classes are large and there is lack of equipment.

The Human Rights Measurement Initiative (HRMI) finds that Ethiopia is fulfilling only 67.1% of what it should be fulfilling for the right to education based on the country's level of income. HRMI breaks down the right to education by looking at the rights to both primary education and secondary education. While taking into consideration Ethiopia's income level, the nation is achieving 85.8% of what should be possible based on its resources (income) for primary education but only 48.4% for secondary education.

== Pre-1900 history ==
Although the existence of inscriptions prove that literacy preceded the adoption of Christianity as the recognized religion in Ethiopia, by the time of the earliest surviving records formal education was controlled by the church. Educational opportunities were seen as the preserve of Ethiopia's ruling Amhara class, but even for Amhara for only a few. Samuel Gobat estimated that "where Amharic is spoken, about one-fifth of the male population can read a little, and in Tigre about one twelfth."

According to Richard Pankhurst, the traditional education provided by the church

began with the learning of the alphabet, or more properly, syllabary, made up of 26 base characters, each with seven forms, indicating the various vowels. The student's second stage comprised the memorization of the first chapter of the first Epistle General of St. John in Geez. The study of writing would probably also begin at this time, and particularly in more modern times some arithmetic might be added. In the third stage the Acts of the Apostles were studied, while certain prayers were also learnt, and writing and arithmetic continued. The children, who also studied signing would now be able to serve as choristers. The fourth stage began with the study of the Psalms of David and was considered an important landmark in a child's education, being celebrated by the parents by a feast in which the teacher, father confessor, relatives and neighbours were invited. A boy who had reached this stage would moreover usually be able to write, and might act as a letter writer. ... Other work in this stage included the study of Praises to God, and the Virgin Mary, the Song of Solomon and the Songs of the Prophets. Many people have learned the song of Solomon.

The higher education the Ethiopian Church provided involved Church music (divided into digua, zemare and mawaset, and qidasse), poetry, mathematics, history, philosophy and manuscript writing. Another field of study was aquaquam or the religious dance performed as part of church services.

== 1900s history ==
Until the early 1900s, formal education was confined to a system of religious instruction organized and presented under the aegis of the Ethiopian Orthodox Church. Church schools prepared individuals for the clergy and for other religious duties and positions. In the process, these schools also provided religious education to the children of the nobility and to the sons of limited numbers of tenant farmers and servants associated with elite families. Such schools mainly served the Amhara and Tigray inhabitants of the Ethiopian Highlands. Misguided policies caused very few children to receive an education. As a result, Ethiopia did not meet the Educational standards of other African countries in the early 1900s.

Toward the end of the nineteenth century, Menelik II had also permitted the establishment of European missionary schools. At the same time, Islamic schools provided some education for a small part of the Muslim population. At the beginning of the twentieth century, the education system's failure to meet the needs of people involved in statecraft, diplomacy, commerce, and industry led to the introduction of government-sponsored secular education. The first public school to provide a western-style education was the Menelik II School, which was opened in October 1908 under the guidance of Hanna Salib and a number of Copt teachers. By 1924, Pankhurst notes that "no fewer than 3,000 students had passed through the school", and states that in 1935 the school had 150 pupils. That same year, Emperor Menelik II established a primary school in Harar.

In 1925 the government adopted a plan to expand secular education, but ten years later there were only 8,000 students enrolled in twenty public schools. A few students also studied abroad on government scholarships; Pankhurst provides minimum numbers for several countries: at least 20 studied in Lebanon, 19 in Egypt, 12 in Sudan, 63 in France, 25 in England, 8 in the United States, 10 in Switzerland, 10 in Italy, and smaller numbers in Germany, Belgium and Spain.

After their conquest of Ethiopia, the Italians acted quickly to reorganize the educational system in Ethiopia. An ordinance issued 24 July 1936 reiterated the principle that the newly conquered country, as in the older colonies, would have two different types of educational institutions, namely "Italian-type schools" and schools for "colonial subjects." The existing Teferi Makonnen School was converted into two "Italian type" schools, the Liceo-Ginnasio Vittorio Emanuele III and the Istituto Tecnico Benito Mussolini, both reserved for European children, while the prewar Empress Menen School for girls was converted into the Regina Elena military hospital. Many other existing schools were converted to Italian-only schools, while new schools created for the native population, in the words of Patrick Roberts, were "not schools in reality, but have been established for propaganda purposes." Although the Italian government boasted in 1939 that there were thirteen primary schools in the province of Shewa staffed by over sixty teachers and having an enrollment of 1481, actual attendance fluctuated greatly, as the official statement admitted that many students were said to be absent from class in order to follow Italian lorries, or to spend their time "idly in their tukuls."

Following the Italian defeat, the country started to build up the sector, but the system faced shortages of teachers, textbooks, and facilities. The government recruited foreign teachers for primary and secondary schools to offset the teacher shortage. By 1952 a total of 60,000 students were enrolled in 400 primary schools, eleven secondary schools, and three institutions offering college-level courses. In the 1960s, 310 mission and privately operated schools with an enrollment of 52,000 supplemented the country's public school system. While reforms have been made in the aims of education, the actual structure of the Ethiopian school system has remained unchanged from that established in the 1950s.

There were two institutions of higher education: Haile Selassie I University in Addis Ababa, formed by imperial charter in 1961, and the private University of Asmara, founded by a Roman Catholic religious order based in Italy. The government expanded the public school system and in 1971 there were 1,300 primary and secondary schools and 13,000 teachers. But the system suffered from a shortage of qualified personnel, a lack of funds, and overcrowded facilities. Often financed with foreign aid, school construction usually proceeded faster than the training and certification of teachers. In addition, most schools were in the major towns. Crowded and understaffed, those schools in small towns and rural areas provided a poor education. The inadequacies of public education before the mid-1970s resulted partly from the school financing system. To finance primary education, the government levied a special tax on agricultural land. Local boards of education supervised the disbursement of tax receipts. The system's inequities fostered the expansion of primary education in wealthier regions rather than in poorer ones. Moreover, urban inhabitants, who did not have to pay the tax but who were predominantly represented in the schools, sent their children at the expense of the taxpaying rural landowners and poor peasants. The government attempted to rectify this imbalance in 1970 by imposing an education tax on urban landowners and a 2 percent tax on the personal income of urban residents. But the Ministry of Finance treated the funds collected as part of the general revenue and never spent the money for its intended purpose. Expenditure on education was only 1.4–3 percent of the gross national product (GNP) between 1968 and 1974, compared with 2.5–6 percent for other African countries during the same period. Under the pressure of growing public dissatisfaction and mounting student activism in the university and secondary schools, the imperial government initiated a comprehensive study of the education system. Completed in July 1972, the Education Sector Review (ESR) recommended attaining universal primary education as quickly and inexpensively as possible, ruralizing the curricula through the inclusion of informal training, equalizing educational opportunities, and relating the entire system to the national development process.

The ESR criticized the education system's focus on preparing students for the next level of academic study and on the completion of rigid qualifying examinations. Also criticized was the government's lack of concern for the young people who dropped out before learning marketable skills, a situation that contributed to unemployment. The report stated that, by contrast, "The recommended system would provide a self-contained program at each level that would be terminal for most students." The report was not published until February 1974, which gave time for rumours to generate opposition among students, parents, and the teachers' union to the ESR recommendations. Most resented what they considered the removal of education from its elite position. Many teachers also feared salary reductions. Strikes and widespread disturbances ensued, and the education crisis became a contributing factor in the imperial regime's fall later that year.

With the beginning of the Ethiopian Revolution in 1974, the name of the university was changed to Addis Ababa University (AAU). By 1974, despite efforts by the government to improve the situation, less than 10 percent of the total population was literate. The Derg launched two major initiatives to address illiteracy. The first was the Zämäča (December 1974 – July 1976), formally known as the Development through Cooperation, Enlightenment, and Work Campaign, which mobilised approximately 60,000 students and teachers and sent them to around 430 rural localities across the country. Out of 756,200 persons registered for literacy instruction, 158,065 completed the full programme. The campaign was abandoned in July 1976 following unrest among participants demanding implementation of land reform. Many critics also regarded it as a means of removing organised student opposition from urban centres.Kiflu Tadesse writes that Ethiopia copied literacy campaigns and related state-building measures of Siad Barre in Somalia.

Building on this experience, the government launched the Ethiopian National Literacy Campaign (ENLC) in July 1979, which ran until 1991. Conducted in 15 Ethiopian languages covering the mother tongues of more than 90 percent of the population, many of which had textbooks produced for the first time, the ENLC registered over 18 million participants. By August 1986 the national literacy rate had risen from approximately 7 percent in 1973 to 62.4 percent, with urban literacy reaching 84.5 percent and rural literacy 59.6 percent. The campaign won UNESCO's International Reading Association Literacy Prize. However, the gains were not consolidated: by the 1994 census, only 23.4 percent of the population aged 10 and over were recorded as literate, showing the impact of rapid population growth, civil war and the collapse of the campaign infrastructure after 1991.

Under the Derg regime, Marxist–Leninist philosophy was the guiding theme for all government systems. One of the first policy changes was the right of every citizen to free primary education. The educational system was geared to attainment of communist ideology. Eastern European governments provided policy advisors to develop a curriculum based on their systems. The general idea was education for the masses and could be summarized in the slogans "Education for production, for research and for political consciousness".

The Derg's (1976) Proclamation No. 103 had public ownership of schools consistent with the socialist system. This still left a few private schools for children of politicians and wealthy families resulting in a higher quality of education for these children than for all others. Primary schooling expanded throughout the country with national enrolment reaching 34.1%. There were still regional disparities with more resources going to the south than to the north. Educational quality decreased with expansion largely due to resource scarcity. The Derg tried to resolve the problem of teacher shortage by recruiting 5,500 untrained teachers from those who had completed grade 12. These teachers had to attend government designed summer schools for three years to obtain certification.

Throughout the Derg regime, civil war, severe drought and famine had a negative effect on educational improvements that had been achieved. By 1991, when the Derg was overthrown by the Ethiopian People's Revolutionary Democratic Front (EPRDF), infrastructure had been destroyed, there was little access to education and extreme poverty was widespread. Since this time, the EPRDF has gradually improved the educational sector leading up to the current system.

== Current system ==
=== Educational structure ===
There is some pre-primary education for children aged 4 to 6 years but provision is patchy. Primary school education has two cycles from age 7 to 10 years (grades 1 to 4) and from age 11 to 14 years (grades 5 to 8). Regional exams are taken at the end of grade 8 (Primary school certificate exam). Secondary education has two cycles from age 15 to 16 years (grades 9 and 10) and from age 17 to 18 years (grades 11 to 12) leading up to the national exams. The Ethiopian General Secondary Education Certificate Examination (EGSECE) is taken at the end of grade 10 and requires a pass in at least 5 subjects to pass to the next level. The Ethiopian Higher Education Entrance Examination (EHEEE) is taken at the end of grade 12. Students passing the EHEEE are eligible for university if their grades are sufficiently high.

Alternative basic education (ABE) provides flexible, community based first cycle primary schooling for out of school children.

Students leaving at the end of grade 10 can go to technical and vocational education and training (TVET) institutions or colleges of teacher training (CTT). TVETs provide an alternative route to university. Universities offer 3-, 4-, and 5-year programs for bachelor's degrees, doctor of medicine and doctor of veterinary medicine. Students who have a bachelor's degree may take a specialized post-graduate program for a master's degree or PhD.

Adult and non-formal education provides primary education to adults over age 14 years and is run by both government and non-government organizations. See for example Adult and Non-Formal Education Association in Ethiopia.

=== Primary and secondary schools ===
==== Statistics ====
The Ministry of Education (MoE) provides some indication of achievements in the five years from 2008/9 to 2012/13 although statistics do depend upon the accuracy of data collected. Primary school enrollment has increased substantially but only about half of those enrolled manage to complete both cycles. There are a large number of over-age children enrolling for grade 1 although this has been declining. This is shown by the difference between gross intake rate (GIR) and net intake rate (NIR). GIR is the percentage of children enrolled for grade 1, regardless of age, out of the population of the appropriate age of 7 years. NIR is the percentage of children of appropriate age out of the population of that age.

In 2008/09, GIR was 162.5% (boys = 169.4%; girls = 144.1%) and NIR was 82.2% (boys = 84.3; girls = 80.1%).

In 2012/13, GIR was 144.1% (boys = 150.2%; girls = 137.8%) and NIR was 95.5% (boys = 97.9%; girls = 93.0%).

Problems are indicated by repetition rates, drop out rates and low completion rates. Repetition rates remained much the same but drop out rates increased.

In 2007/08, repetition rates for grades 1 to 8 were 6.7% (boys = 7.0%; girls = 6.3%) and in 2012/13, they were 7.9% (boys = 8.1%; girls = 7.7%). In 2012/13, repetition rates were highest for grades 1, 5 and 8.

In 2007/08, drop out rates from grades 1 to 8 were 14.6% (boys = 15.9%; girls = 13.2%) and in 2012/13, they were 16.1% (boys = 16.2%; girls = 16.0%).

In 2007/08, the survival rate to grade 5 was 49.2% (boys = 45.8%; girls = 53.3%) and in 2012/13, it was 50.7% (boys = 49.6%; girls = 39.1%).

Completion rates for grade 5 varied around 70% and 80% but completion rates for grade 8 have improved from 43.6% to 52.8% with near parity between boys and girls. There were regional differences in grade 8 completion rates.

In 2012/13, lowest completion rates were in Afar (16.4%) and Somali (15.9%) followed by Oromia (43.5%). About 80% of children sitting the grade 8 exam passed to grade 9.

Most children are not going to secondary school and differences between gross enrolment ratio (GER) and net enrolment ratio (NER) indicate that many of these children are over-age. GER is the percentage of children enrolled out of the population of appropriate age. NER is the percentage of children of appropriate age out of the population of that age.

In 2008/09, GER was 38.1% (boys =43.7%; girls = 32.4%) and NER was 13.5% (boys = 15.0%; girls = 11.9%).

In 2012/13, GER was 38.4% (boys = 39.9%; girls = 36.9%) and NER was 19.4% (boys = 18.8%; girls = 20.1%).

From all children registered for the 10th grade exam, the percentage scoring the pass mark of 2 or more increased from 42.6% in 2008/09 to 70.1% in 2012/13 with girls increasing from 32.2% to 61.9%.

A very small proportion of children attend the second cycle of secondary school. Between 2008/09 and 2012/13, GER increased from 6.0% to 9.5% with girls increasing from 3.5% to 8.5%. From all children registered for the grade 12 exam in 2012/13, 91.7% attained the pass mark of 201 or more but only 1.7% attained 501 or more.

==== Access and demand ====
There have been improvements in access to primary schools while alternative basic education and innovations such as mobile schools are helping to reach disadvantaged groups and remote rural areas. Between 2008/09 and 2012/13, the number of primary schools increased from 25,212 to 30,534. Schooling needs sometimes to be conducted in the shade of trees. The blackboard is kept in a nearby homestead and mounted every morning. The children sit on stones while following lessons. Such lack of classrooms is directly related to the large intake in primary schools in Ethiopia over the last decades.

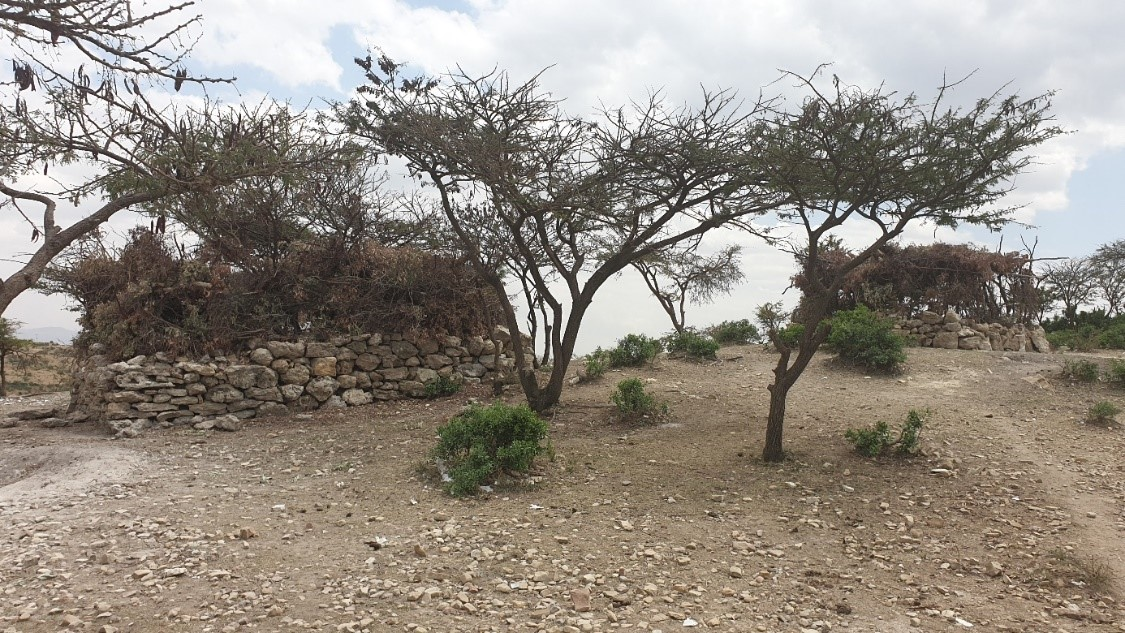
Open air primary school in Afedena

More primary schools need to be built to reach the government target, especially in Somali Region, the Southern Nations, Nationalities and People's Region (SNNPR), Oromia, Gambela Region and Benishangul-Gumuz. Between 2008/09 and 2012/13, the number of secondary schools increased from 1,197 to 1,912 but Harari Region, Afar Region, and Dire Dawa have very few. The small number of secondary schools means that many children who do complete primary school have no access to secondary schools.

Not all parents can afford to send their children to school. Parents may need to pay for clothes, books, transport and school fees. In 1994, school fees for grades 1 to 10 were officially abolished but hidden costs remained. Other costs include loss of children's wages or unpaid labour for agriculture, tending livestock or housework. Whether children work depends on relative household wealth. Labour-intensive assets such as farms can hire labour if they generate sufficient profit but poorer households may need their children to help with these assets. This can relate to family size, with larger families sending their younger children to school because older children can help their parents. Attendance is reduced when children have to travel long distances to school since this increases personal risk and transport costs. There are also cultural attitudes against educating girls since education will only benefit her husband's household.

==== Curriculum ====
The first cycle of primary education concentrates on functional literacy while the second cycle is preparation for secondary education. In principle, the curriculum aims to link theory with practice in real life and to use a problem-solving approach. Primary education includes: Languages (mother tongue, Amharic), Amharic as second language, Mathematics, Environmental science, Natural science (Physics, Chemistry and Biology in grades 7 and 8), Social science (grades 5 to 8) and Aesthetic education. Secondary school (grades 9 to 10) continues subjects taken in primary school: English and a national language, Mathematics, Natural Sciences (Physics, Chemistry and Biology), Social sciences (Civic education, Geography and History) and Physical education.

The secondary school second cycle (grades 11 and 12) continues the Natural Science and Social science streams. Common subjects in the two streams are English, Mathematics, Civic education, Information technology, a national language and Physical education. The students in the social science stream take Economics, General Business education, History and Geography while those in natural science take Physics, Chemistry, Biology and Technical drawing in addition to the common subjects.

Universities used to have a first year to prepare students for a degree but now schools are expected to prepare students. This has had a knock-on effect of moving the freshman programs down to grades 11 and 12 and programs for grades 11 to 12 down to grades 9 and 10. The grade 9 to 10 curriculum is now equivalent to grades 11 and 12 in many other countries and it covers more subjects than most other countries require for university.

The World Bank considers that the curriculum should change from its focus on a few high-level achievers to education for all. Curriculum content differentiation should start in grades 9 and 10 and undergo further differentiation in grades 11 and 12 to provide alternatives to university. There should be continued expansion and improvement of quality in both primary and secondary education to prepare students for different career options in the growing economy. This should take priority over expanding university education. Primary and secondary education should be laying the foundation for lifelong learning by promoting meta-cognitive skills such as reading meaningfully, learning how to learn, group learning, real understanding, cognitive restructuring and information retrieval.

==== Quality of teaching ====
Teaching is undervalued and underpaid as a profession and this was not helped by the selection procedure. Prior to 2010, students with lower achievement at grade 10 could go to a Teacher Training Institute (TTI) or a College of Teacher's Education (CTE) for a certificate or diploma. If students passed the EHEEE, education faculties took students with lower GPAs than other faculties. Teaching is hard work with high mean pupil/teacher ratios in primary schools and many operating a double shift. Many teachers lack motivation and 60% would move to another job if given the opportunity.

Teacher pay starts at about the same level as other civil service jobs but after two years teachers earn less than their civil service counterparts. There are seven salary rungs from beginner to senior lead after 17 years of service. In 2012, the salary scale for primary school teachers went from 1,172 Birr to 3,499 Birr. In 2012, 100 Birr was worth about £3.50 or $5.50. Somali region pays 30% of the salary as an allowance for working in remote areas and Addis Ababa pays up to 10% for a housing allowance. There are no incentives for good performance.

The Regional Educational Bureau (REB) allocated teachers to Woredas, which then assigned them to schools. School directors played no part in teacher selection. New teachers were often sent to remote areas where they were isolated and women teachers were vulnerable to harmful local traditions such as abduction for marriage, sexual assault and rape. Teachers complained about poor management that was often authoritarian rather than democratic. School director appointments were not seen to be based on merit and, in some cases, were clearly political. Political appointees were more involved in politics than the school and were often absent on political duties.

Between 2006/7 and 2010/11, national learning assessments (NLAs) showed some improvement in percentages of children obtaining basic-level proficiency in grades 4 and 8. Grade 4 increased from 41% to 43% and grade 8 increased from 37% to 44%. In 2008/09, 63.7% of grade 10 and 55.2% of grade 12 were performing below basic level. By 2011/12, poor performance showed some decrease, although percentages varied between subjects. In 2010, an early grade reading assessment for mother tongue found regional differences between 10% and 70% of grade 2 children unable to read and 90% of grade 3 children below the expected oral reading fluency rate. Low reading ability related to accessibility of a language textbook or other reading material.

The government aimed to provide each pupil with a textbook but the reality was a severe shortage of textbooks and other teaching materials. Consequently, teaching was usually "talk and chalk" with rote learning. Secondary schools may have a plasma television to receive the national curriculum in 60% of subjects but its success has been limited since it depends on electricity supply, good teacher facilitation and supply of textbooks. School libraries tend to be under-stocked or stocked with inappropriate books from international donations. Plasma lessons are broadcast in English for 35 minutes from Addis Ababa. Standard lesson time is 45 minutes, leaving teachers with 10 minutes for an introduction and post-discussion. Transmission was too fast for many pupils to keep up with the English and there were no facilities to record and repeat the lesson resulting in many failing to understand the lesson. Hence, only children from rich families, who had television at home and private tutors to supplement the lessons, could benefit from lessons delivered by plasma television. The remaining 90% were disadvantaged by plasma television lessons. This could be remedied by distributing plasma lessons on CDs/DVDs to be used as teaching aids for teacher/pupil discussion.

Part of the government general education quality improvement program (GEQIP), launched in 2009, has been to up-grade teacher qualifications. Primary school teachers for grades 1 to 4 now need a diploma instead of certificate. As a result, MoE statistics show a drop in qualified primary school teachers, for grades 1 to 4, from 84.9% in 2008/09 to 15.4% in 2009/10. This percentage has increased to 43.8% in 2012/13 suggesting that grade 1 to 4 primary school teachers are up-grading their qualifications. The percentage of qualified grade 5 to 8 primary school teachers has increased from 71.6% in 2008/9 to 92% in 2012/13. Degrees among secondary school teachers increased from 77.4% in 2009/10. to 91.5% in 2012/13.

Pupil/teacher ratios have been improving. Mean primary school pupil/teacher ratios decreased from 53.8 in 2008/09 to 49.4 in 2012/13, although there are wide variations between regions. Mean secondary school pupil/teacher decreased from 41 in 2008/09 to 28.7 in 2012/13. Large school size also reduces educational quality. In 2012/13, mean secondary school size was 994 with variation between regions from 1,511 in Amhara to 454 in Afar.

==== Corruption ====
The World Bank survey of 80 teachers found that 80% reported general dissatisfaction with procedures for up-grading with 50% considering it was influenced by political connections and 27% by relationships to committee members. Bribery was mentioned by 9%. Application of rules and regulations could be at the discretion of key decision makers and favouritism was unchallenged. Teachers' absenteeism was tolerated to allow private tutoring, which was reported by 40% of school officials. Promotion was seen as unrelated to merit and could involve forged documentation, possibly supported by officials who failed to notice forgeries. There were some reports of corruption in student assessment such as staff changing marks, favouring their relatives and selectively leaking questions. Fraudulent practices in examinations included forged admission cards (to allow students to pay others to take their exam) and collusion in cheating between students and school officials. In one case, regional officials were alleged to have overturned a disqualification. Teachers might also accept bribes from students or parents to over-score the examination. Falsification of documents was widespread with most occurring for completion of the primary or secondary school cycle. There could be corruption in the building of new educational facilities, particularly in remote areas which were difficult to supervise. Corruption was indicated when a building collapsed but no one was held to account and there was no investigation. Bribery was regarded as worse than favouritism or document falsification. Expressing gratitude with a small gift was not considered corrupt. Malpractice tended not to be reported for fear of reprisals. Parent Teacher Associations (PTAs) and general knowledge of pupil entitlement helped to reduce some sources of potential corruption.

=== Language ===
==== Mother tongue ====
Amharic has traditionally been the Ethiopian lingua franca; there are about 90 different Ethiopian languages or dialects. Primary schools taught children in Amharic until 1994, when the government promoted use of ethnic languages as the medium of instruction. Children whose mother tongue is not Amharic are still disadvantaged since they also have to learn Amharic. Amharic shares the Ge'ez script with other Semitic languages such as Tigrinya (Tegrigna), the Gurage languages and related Harari. Afan Oromo is the mother tongue of about a third of Ethiopians and it, together with Wolaytta, Afar, Sidama and Somali, use a Latin script. This can cause interference with learning English because the sounds represented differ from those used in English.

There are particular difficulties in trying to introduce mother-tongue teaching when the mother tongue is only spoken by a small minority. In North Omo, there are eleven main ethnic groups with their own languages as well as non-tribal people speaking Amharic. Local languages do share common features but, since language is a marker of identity, no one language could be chosen. Attempts to introduce hybrid languages caused language riots, so the four main ethnic groups were allowed to use their own languages. However, at that time textbooks and teaching materials were only available in Wolaytta and a hybrid language. Some children were still disadvantaged if their mother tongue differed from the local language because they were left with no language that could be used beyond the local area. Children whose mother tongue was insufficiently developed for use in instruction could be taught in Amharic. Parents and children could dislike mother-tongue teaching because the mother tongue could be learned at home while Amharic and English provided work opportunities and access to higher education.

Practical difficulties included recruiting teachers by ethnic group rather than language ability. Consequently, some teachers were expected to teach their ethnic language even if their ability was poor while other teachers, who could speak the ethnic language, were not recruited. Teachers who could speak the local language had no training in its structure or written form. Local languages could lack standardization and their vocabularies might be too limited to cover the curriculum. Lack of dictionaries and grammar books meant that teachers had no guide to the proper use of language and textbooks were the only written material to help students with reading. One solution to these problems has been to allow bilingual instruction and Amharic sections in some schools.

In 2010, an Early Grade Reading Assessment (EGRA) for grades 2 to 3 in six mother tongues (Afan Oromo, Amharic, Harari, Sidama, Somali and Tegrigna) found that only about 5% of children had a reading fluency above the benchmark of 60 words per minute. In a sub-test of reading comprehension, the percentage of grade 2 children scoring "0" ranged from 69.2% in Sidama to 10.1% in Addis Ababa. By grade 3, this percentage had dropped to 54% and 3.8% respectively. It was poor reading comprehension that accounted for poor results in other tests. Overall, boys scored higher than girls but this was due to girls' low scores in rural areas. Girls scored higher than boys in urban areas.

==== English ====
English is the medium of instruction for later years in some primary schools, all secondary schools and in higher education. Politically, some Ethiopians regard English-medium instruction, with English textbooks, as replacing Ethiopian culture with Western values and loss of identity. The failure of Ethiopia to modernize was because modernization was based on Western values rather than renewal within the Ethiopian tradition. Educational systems foster national unity by inculcating social, cultural and political ideas and these need to become Ethiopian by replacing English instruction with instruction in Ethiopian languages. Amharic or Afan Oromo are spoken by more than 60% of Ethiopians, so it is essential for these languages to be learnt by Ethiopians.

Currently, English medium instruction is having a detrimental effect on Ethiopian educational attainment. English is a foreign language in Ethiopia with little support from the media outside educational establishments. A study of English instruction in primary schools of the Gedeo and Sidama zones (SNNPR) found that grade 5 students' English was so poor that they were unable to learn. Their teachers' English was too poor to teach their students and there was lack of English teaching materials.

The Ethiopian Teach English for Life (TELL) program aims to improve English teaching in primary schools. New textbooks in English, Amharic and other mother tongues have been printed and are being distributed to primary schools. TELL is instigating a nationwide in-service teacher training program and an EGRA. Between 2009 and 2011, TELL began by training a group of master trainers in improved instruction techniques with new English textbooks and teacher guides. Master trainers trained trainers of teachers in each region. Trainers of teachers provided a 4-day in-service training to primary school teachers. Teaching techniques for grades 1 and 2 teachers focused on teaching children to speak and listen to English, to read and write English and on vocabulary and story telling. Seventeen different techniques were taught to grades 3 and 4 teachers, which continued the focus on reading, writing, vocabulary and story telling. In a follow-up three months later, some of the teachers were using the new techniques. Teachers for grades 1 and 2 had most difficulty with using unfamiliar techniques that required children to think and talk aloud independently. Teachers for grades 3 and 4 seldom used double entry. This is a technique that requires interaction with peers to categorize information from a text. Constraints for all teachers included large class sizes, children at different ability levels, lack of time and lack of new textbooks. This type of one-shot training is not enough. There needed to be further follow-ups and collective participation involving the headmaster and other teachers to encourage problem solving and reflection.

Poor English continued to be a problem at university. Instructors at Addis Ababa University (AAU) found students' English so poor that they confined assessments to written tasks rather than alternatives such as presentations or debates. Students with the lowest competence in English were placed in the College of Education for training as teachers and would thus be the most ill-equipped for English medium instruction.

Communicative language teaching (CLT) was tried at Arba Minch and Hawassa universities. Teachers, department heads, and vice-presidents agreed that teachers needed support to implement CLT but in-service training had little effect on teaching. This was probably because in-service CLT training consisted of short courses without supporting follow-up. Managers said they supported professional development but, in practice, this was given low priority in the face of crowded timetables and budget cuts.

=== Gender issues ===
==== Early marriage ====
The Ethiopian gender survey of women aged 15 to 49 years in seven regions found that more urban (74.5%) than rural (30.9%) women had ever been to school. Younger women, aged 15 to 19 years (75.8%), were more likely to have attended school than older women, aged 40 to 49 years, (16.6%). The main reason for girls not attending school was family disapproval and this was more prevalent in rural (54.1%) than in urban (45.5%) areas. Marriage as the reason for non-attendance was given by 23.3% in rural areas and by 16% in urban areas. Marriage as the reason for leaving school was given by 38.6% in rural areas and by 21% in urban areas. Most women (71%) were or had been married. The median age for marriage was 19.1 years for urban women and 16.9 years for rural women.

In rural Amhara in 2003/04, there were strong social and cultural pressures for girls to marry before they were 14 years old. Virginity before marriage was highly valued and an unmarried girl over 14 year was stigmatized. She was an embarrassment to herself and her family and regarded as a financial burden since her contribution to domestic and agricultural activities was not valued. The age of first marriage had been declining since the mothers' average age of marriage was 11 years while their daughters' average age of marriage was 8 years. Early marriage allowed formation of bonds between families and, when families were land rich, it maintained their land holdings. Sons from land poor families, who had reached the age of 18, could obtain land from the peasants association if they married. There was no need for brides to be 18 and they were often under 11 years old. Boys, but not girls, were expected to be successful at the local school. Success for a girl was as a wife and mother and early marriage provided recognition in the community.

The Berhane Hewan package of interventions, in rural Amhara from 2004 to 2006, demonstrated that girls' school attendance could be improved by increasing the age of marriage. Girls in school and those wanting to return were supported by being given school materials. Parents and their participating daughters had to sign a registration form. If the girl was unmarried, parents had to agree not to marry their daughter during the two-year program and, if this condition was met, the girl and her family would receive a goat at the end of the program. The intervention increased school attendance and delayed marriage for girls aged 10 to 14 years compared with controls. The intervention made no difference to girls in the 15 to 19 year age group.

==== Violence against school girls ====
Globally, younger children are at greater risk from physical violence while older children are more likely to suffer from sexual violence. Boys are more at risk from physical violence than girls, while girls may face neglect and sexual violence. Patriarchal attitudes perpetuate women's inferior status and increase violence against women. Many of Ethiopia's different ethnic groups share a culture of patriarchal norms and values. Girls are socialized to be shy and obedient and not to speak in front of adults, particularly in front of men. The focus is on her future role as obedient wife and good mother.

The Ethiopian constitution specifies that children are to be protected from harm, violence and abuse but violence against children continues to be widespread. Data were collected from 41 Woredas in all nine regions during 2007. Among teachers, parents and school children, those replying "Yes" to perceiving different types of violence in school or on the way to and from school varied between regions. Teachers perceived the highest levels in Afar (61%), SNNPR (57%0 and Addis Ababa (53%) and lowest in Harari (5%) and Dire Dawa (21%). Verbal assault was the most common form of violence against girls. Girls experienced a number of different forms of violence on their way to and from school. This might be from older boys, boys out of school or members of the community. Local community members might humiliate girls because they were getting an education. The level of perceived violence was generally high (above 40%) with students perceiving the highest levels in Dire Dawa and Tigray. Abduction was least common although teachers did see more of this (17%) than parents (10%) or students (7%). This meant that the journey to and from school was particularly unsafe for girls.

Corporal punishment is prohibited in schools but it is still widely practiced. Both students (34%) and teachers (25%) reported corporal punishment by teachers and parents against girls in school. Apart from corporal punishment, mainly older boys beat up girls to harass and degrade them or in retaliation for a refusal to initiate a sexual relationship. Male students might snatch girls' school materials, intimidate them and threaten to harm them as a way of forcing them into sexual relationships. Parents could take girls' property as a disciplinary measure. School teachers were reported to humiliate and verbally abuse girls in class and this was worse if the girl was attractive. In the school community, girls most frequently suffered verbal abuse aimed at undermining their self-esteem. Other abuse involved touching private parts and punishment for refusing sexual requests. School girls might experience various forms of seduction before being subjected to sexually violent acts. This could be from school boys, teachers or rich sugar daddies who waited outside school gates.

Both boys and girls could experience sexual harassment although girls experienced it more frequently. Members of the school community sexually harassed girls in and around school. Jobless men, unmarried men looking for partners or sex, and married men looking for sex, sexually harassed girls on their way to and from school. In some cases, this could involve sexual assault and rape. Girls in the 10 to 19 year age group were most affected. Rape perpetrators could be diverse men in the community or men passing through the community. When rape occurred at home, perpetrators included uncles, cousins, fathers and stepfathers. Girls could be abducted for marriage which meant the man did not have to pay a bride price. Some compensation might be paid to the girl's parents so they would acknowledge the marriage. Parents could arrange an early or forced marriage against the girl's wishes to continue her education.

Once girls enter school, patriarchal norms and values work against norms and values of modern education which aims to provide equal education for boys and girls. Parents may allow girls to attend school but still expect them to fulfill traditional duties rather than giving then time to do homework or arrive at school before school gates are shut. Girls are expected to participate in class contrary to their training for non-participation. If girls try to meet school norms for participation they are subjected to psychological violence reinforcing patriarchal norms. Girls may also be subjected to violence and abuse at home if they act on new school norms contrary to tradition. This clash of norms continues on the way to and from school with older boys and adult men seeing adolescent girls as unprotected by marriage. Consequently, girls experience physical and sexual violence and are at risk of abduction. Girls' attempts to cope with the educational system may increase their risk of violence and sexual abuse. Girl students were some of the main perpetrators of violence against other girls and they could act as go-betweens for boys in the hope that boys would favor them.

Violence against girls discourages them from attending school. Sexual or physical violence on the way to and from school or at home reduces girls' ability to concentrate in class. Instead of attending to the lesson, they are thinking about the violence they have experienced or worrying about future violence to come. Abuse reduces girls' participation in class even further than normal and reduces their ability to complete homework. Abused girls are more likely to have low attainment, more grade repetition and a higher drop-out rate than non-abused girls.

Most teachers (79%), students (69%) and some parents (55%) were aware of rules to stop violence against girls. Students knew major forms of violence could be punished but there were difficulties in implementing rules. Traditional structures of elders and religious leaders need to be involved since they were preventing implementation. All concerned organizations and stakeholders needed to work towards reducing violence against girls.

==== Sanitary facilities ====
Both primary and secondary schools may lack a water supply and separate toilets for girls and boys. This is one reason for girls leaving secondary school or missing classes. No privacy and lack of water supply means that girls prefer to stay at home during menstruation. Girls may lack knowledge of menstrual hygiene since the subject is taboo. An intervention in four districts of Southern Ethiopia, identified and tested local material for making sanitary pads, trained local tailors to make and mass-produce them, established local supply outlets and lobbied stakeholders to up-scale. Successful testing and raising awareness of the problem resulted in improved facilities for girls in five primary schools and one secondary school.

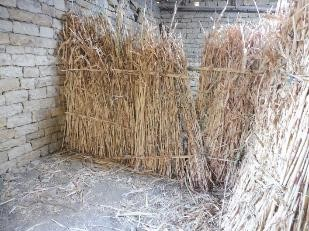
Clothes change place for adolescent girls in Zerfenti school

Efforts are also done in rural schools to establish change rooms for girls handling menstrual hygiene.

==== Women in higher education ====
Ethiopian government policy has supported affirmative action for women since its inception in 1994. Women are admitted to higher education with a 2-point GPA lower than men. This increased the female admission rate but also increased their attrition rate. For example, female enrolment in teacher education at Jimma University increased from 16.9% in 2001–02 to 26.23% in 2006-07 but 70.2% of females were dismissed in 2005-06 compared with 15.45% of males. Similarly, female enrolment at Debub University in 2004-05 was 18.22% but their dismissal rate was 35.1%.

Causes for the high female dismissal rate were studied at Jimma University. Students re-admitted in 2007-08 and staff completed questionnaires and took part in focus groups. Only 37% of female students had been taught by female teachers. The advantages of having female teachers were that female teachers were better than male teachers at understanding their problems, they could share their experiences of the challenges they had to overcome, they could discuss their problems freely and find solutions. In class, female students felt free to ask and answer questions and female teachers showed them that it was possible for them to attain higher levels if they worked hard like men. Only 27% of female students had received assertiveness training. However, female students had received informal orientation advice from senior female students in their first year. Lack of assertiveness training encourages female students to feel inferior about their abilities and to lack confidence in speaking up when conflict arises. This contributes to low achievement, dismissal and dropping out. Feelings of powerlessness make them dependent on others such as male students. Some students (46%) had not chosen their university and 74.1% had not chosen their department. The former increased homesickness when they were too far away to visit their parents, and the latter reduced interest in the university and in attending lessons. There was a guidance and counseling service but only 22% of students were aware of its existence and none had attended. Poor time management could be another reason for dropping out. When female students first arrived, their time was wasted by male students repeatedly trying to start love affairs. If a love affair did start, it was the man who decided when they would meet so interrupting the woman's studies. The women agreed with the man's decisions to maintain the relationship and avoid losing the academic benefits the relationship provided. Many students were from poor families and could not afford necessities for education and university life. They might try to resolve their economic difficulties through high risk sexual activity. There was widespread sexual harassment and discrimination from male students and, sometimes, male teachers. Both consensual and non-consensual sex could result in HIV, pregnancy and drop out.

Women can experience all types of violence from childhood onwards but most sexual violence is experienced in high school and in the first year at university. At Wolaita Sodo university, many female students studied in 2011 had experienced different types of violence. Prevalence was: 8.7% completed rape, 23.5% attempted rape, 24.2% physical harassment, 18.7% verbal harassment and 11.3% forced sexual initiation. Having a boyfriend currently or being married could serve as a shield against non-partner sexual violence in the university, although they were still susceptible to sexual victimization by their intimate partners.

Sexual violence from male students was the main research female students gave for the high attrition rate at Debub University. Other reasons included unapproachable instructors, boyfriend's lack of support and belief that they could not compete because affirmative action had allowed them to be admitted with lower grades than men. Boyfriends decided dating times and places which disrupted their studies. Other disadvantages included lack of learning materials, inadequate secondary school preparation and no counseling and guidance service. Pregnancy and sickness were further reasons for dropping out.

The 2014 report from the director of female affairs at Jimma University describes strategies used to empower female students. The concept of affirmative action was understood by both female and male students and by instructors. Seventy-five female students received leadership and assertiveness training. These students actively participated in group work, used the café equally with male students, were successful in exams and were training new female students. Female students were trained in assertiveness, life skills and reproductive health issues. The result was increased ability to say "No", campus living became easier since they could walk alone to the dining room, study areas and around campus, and the number of abortions decreased. Gender consciousness was raised and female students were able to protect themselves from HIV/AIDS. Extra cash and materials were provided for needy female students preventing withdrawal for economic reasons. All new female students received an orientation program for university life and high achieving female students were given an award by the university president. Attrition rate decreased from 24% to 3.5% and the number of high achieving female students increased from 40 to 145. The future plan is to raise awareness of gender issues in staff throughout the university and to develop an anti-sexual harassment and misconduct policy.

=== Technical and vocational education (TVET) ===
The Federal TVET agency delegates regional TVET agencies or regional education bureaus to implement their decisions, procedures and guidelines, including accrediting providers and issuing Certificates of Competence (CoC). TVETs can prepare their own curricular to meet local conditions. TVETs aim to provide marketable and entrepreneurial skills and previously provided one or two year certificates and a three-year diploma for students who had passed grade 10 exams. Now students may enter the TVET system at levels 1 to 4 depending on their grade 10 results. Students entering at level 1 can progress to higher levels if they pass the outcome based occupational assessment taken at the end of each level. Students who have passed through the TVET system and worked for two years can apply to a public university. TVETs have expanded to train students without formal qualifications and these courses can last from a few days to a year or more.

Occupational standards define the expected outcome of students' training. The national qualifications framework has five CoC levels which industries accept as effective for performance at work. CoC levels 1 and 2 provide entry to an industry or occupation. CoC level 3 is a trade level and CoC levels 4 and 5 are for supervisors, middle management or people with special technical skills. A CoC can be awarded to anyone passing the occupational assessment for each level, regardless of the way the skill was obtained. This includes both formal training and informal training at work or in the family.

There is prejudice against attending TVETs since they are regarded as catering for those unable to pass the grade 12 exams and some trades have traditionally been associated with despised "castes" regarded as polluting. Despite this prejudice, there has been substantial increase in TVET enrolment in the five years between 2006/07 and 2010/11 although training for males and females remains gender stereotyped.

Government TVETs are particularly concerned with occupations requiring investment in machinery and equipment and with increasing provision in remote areas. Workshop provision varies in quality. Some TVETs have good provision but many others have a shortage of workshops or old dilapidated workshops that lack safety features, basic sanitary facilities and essential equipment. Classrooms, stores and libraries may be in poor condition or non-existent. Instructors may lack competence since, in 2012, only 53% of those assessed met the assessment criteria. Even when TVETs have machinery and equipment, there are too many students for the few resources available. Students cannot meet the 70% to 80% requirement for practice and training remains theory based. Consequently, students have difficulty in meeting the assessment criteria with only 23% of students being found competent in 2012. Students who do graduate may still find it hard to get work. The Amhara TVET promotion bureau found only about 40% of TVET graduates managed to obtain employment.

Both public and private TVETs have failed to link education and training to the skills and quality of skills required by the labour market and have failed to monitor graduates' subsequent employment. Once TVETs have labour market information, they should provide vocational guidance to match skills to job opportunities. Private TVETs, accounting for 51% of TVET provision in 2010/11, are concentrated in urban areas and have largely been concerned with making a profit rather than their graduates' employment opportunities. They do tend to have better resources and more practically skilled instructors than public TVETs but they have been reluctant to allow their workshops to be used for co-operative training and occupational assessment.

=== Teacher training ===
Teachers are trained in 34 colleges of teacher education (CTE) and 10 universities. Previously, kindergarten and primary schools, grades 1 to 4, required a one or two year teaching certificate while grades 4 to 8 needed a three-year diploma. Recently, certificates have been replaced by a three-year diploma for all new primary school teachers. Selection requirements for primary school teaching include a minimum of 2 in the grade 10 exam (EGSECE), no "F" grades in mathematics or English and a minimum of "C" in specialist subjects. Student teachers take an entrance exam and are given an interview to assess interpersonal skills and motivation. Primary school teachers' cluster training prepares teachers for grades 1 to 4 and linear training prepares teachers for grades 5 to 8. All students have the same professional training but differ in that cluster training has composite subject matter while linear training includes three specialist subjects. These are three year programs for a diploma. A policy revision is expected to up-grade teacher qualifications to a degree for grades 7 and 8.

Secondary school teachers needed a BEd until 2010. Since 2011, they have to have a BSc or BA related to secondary school subjects plus a one-year post-graduate diploma in teaching (PGDT) which includes a practicum accounting for 30% of the credit hours. Student teachers also take an entrance examination and have an interview for PGDT enrolment.

Primary school teacher educators are expected to have a first degree in a relevant subject and are being encouraged to take a second degree. They are expected to develop professionalism by earning a higher diploma, participating in research and by having primary school teaching experience. Secondary school teacher educators are expected to have post-graduate degrees in education and at least three years teaching experience in secondary schools or five years teaching experience in teacher colleges.

In 2012/13, enrolment in CTEs for regular, evening and summer classes increased from 81,091 (39% female) in 2008/09 to 175,142 (40.2% female) in 2012/13. Combining the cluster and linear modalities, the number of graduates has increased from 16,129 (38.8% female) in 2008/09 to 43,890 (43.1% female) in 2012/13. CTE staff have increased from 774 (12.1% female) in 2008/09 to 2044 (8.4% female) in 2012/13.

=== Higher education ===
Addis Ababa University (AAU) was the first university established (in 1950) followed by Haramaya University (1954). By 2007, the seven existing universities were expanding and 13 new public universities had started construction. By 2012, the number of public universities had risen to 34, 31 owned by the MoE plus the Ethiopian civil service university, Defense university college and Kotebe college of teacher education. There were 64 accredited non-government universities or colleges awarding degrees.

Between 2008/09 and 2012/13, undergraduate enrolment for regular, evening, summer and distance programs had increased in both government (86%) and non-government universities from 310,702 (29% female) to 553,484 (30% female). First degree graduates increased from 56,109 (29.9% female) to 79,073 (28.6% female).

Between 2008/09 and 2012/13, masters' enrolment in government and non-government universities increased from 9,800 (11.4% female) to 28,139 (20.4% female). Doctorate enrolment increased from 325 (8% female) to 3,165 (11.2% female). Masters' graduates increased from 3,574 (11.8% female) to 6,353 (14.9% female) and doctorate graduates increased from 15 (0% female) to 71 (9.9% female). Academic staff increased from 11,028 (9.8% female) to 23,905 (10.5% female).

In 2012/13, the undergraduate intake ratio of science and technology to social and humanities sciences for government regular programs was 74.26 and for all programs it was 67.33.

==== Quality assurance ====
The Ethiopian government established the Higher Education and Relevance Quality Agency (HERQA) to monitor the quality of education provided in higher education institutions. The government appoints HERQA's director and the chairman of the board is an MoE representative. Western consultants helped develop HERQA guidelines and provided initial training for quality assurance. HERQA's responsibility is limited to providing reports and recommendations to the institutions involved and the MoE. HERQA accredits private institutions but only conducts an institutional audit for public institutions. Public institutions do not need to act on HERQA recommendations.

HERQA recommended that university staff should be about 30% PhDs, 50% Masters and less than 20% first degree holders. Excluding medical and veterinary degrees, in 2012/13, qualifications for all government universities were 13% PhDs, 54.7% Masters and 32.2% first degrees. AAU was approaching the recommendation with 27.6% PhDs, 55.3% Masters and 17.1% first degrees.

There was some doubt about HERQA's competence to fulfill its mission since the majority of members were from agriculture and would thus not be able to insure quality and relevance throughout the higher education sector.

Business process re-engineering has recently been introduced across the public sector to improve effectiveness and efficiency from "scratch" but this has received only limited support from universities. HERQA has recently changed its name to Education Training Quality Assurance Agency (ETQAA)

==== Government responsibilities and directives ====
The Federal government provides a block grant to universities based on student enrolment but unrelated to performance and lacking in accountability. When university education was first introduced, students were given free room and board but, since 2003, there has been cost sharing whereby the student pays full cost for room and board and a minimum of 15% of tuition fees. The government provides a loan which must be repaid, starting one year after completing the degree. Certain programs are chosen for exemption whereby students can re-pay in kind. In the case of secondary school teacher training, students can serve as teachers for a specific number of years.

The MoE has the power to grant university status to an institution if it has the potential to reach university status in an "acceptable time", which is not specified. New universities thus struggle to meet the criteria upon which they were awarded university status in advance.

The MoE ordered curriculum reforms but over-rode proposals from academics so all universities had the same mission and academics thought they had no right to make curriculum revisions. Universities could not initiate new programs without MoE permission but the MoE could choose a university and order a new program without proper curriculum development or adequate facilities and equipment. Consequently, curriculum reforms to graduate programs became unstable and this instability spread to Masters' programs. AAU was ordered to change to modular programs for all master's degrees. The MoE's directives effectively prevented universities from carrying out their mission.

The government requires universities to have 70% of students in engineering and natural science and 30% in humanities and social sciences. Students can state a preference but only those with high marks in the grade 12 exam are likely to be selected for their chosen course.

==== Governance ====
Ethiopian universities used to have collegial governance. There were three governing bodies: a) the executive body of president and department heads which implemented decisions passed by the senate, b) the senate which included professors, faculty and student representatives and was responsible for academic matters and c) the supervisory body of assemblies which provided advice to the executive. The president was the chief executive officer directing the university. The university board had overall supervision and was independent of the MoE. It selected candidates for president based on merit and made recommendations to the government.

In 2008, there was a change from the collegial model to management model with the introduction of outcomes-based BPR. AAU expanded administrative posts to create a reform office and five vice-presidents. Previous faculties and schools were combined into seven colleges headed by directors reporting to the president. Faculty or school deans reported to vice-presidents. Colleges had greater autonomy from the central administration in terms of using their budgets and organizing activities. However, this did not reduce the high ratio of support staff (60%) to academic staff (40%).

Research on governance and teaching quality was conducted between 2009 and 2010 at AAU, Mekelle University (MU) and Jigjiga University (JU). MU is a young, medium-sized university upgraded from a college in 2000 and JU is one of the twelve small recently established universities. At AAU, long-serving academics considered that governance had changed from democratic to autocratic. Previously, the three university bodies were strong and provided quality assurance but now the president had all the power with assemblies reduced to meetings and only a skeleton senate remaining. There were rules and regulations but they were ignored. Leaders were quarreling among themselves and preventing any attempt at change. University leaders used to be selected on merit, from those who had come up through the system, but now they were appointed by the government and their ability was questionable. There was no control from the university board since they were government officials with their own work and little interest in the university. Increasing numbers of academic staff were failing to attend their classes and there was no one to check their attendance, research or student learning. The introduction of BPR had only produced another layer in the bureaucratic hierarchy, contrary to BPR recommendations to reduce hierarchy.

MU had implemented BPR to the extent of having policies and a one-man quality assurance office that lacked resources or support from top management. They had introduced self-evaluation but this made no difference to practice. Staff and management thought leadership lacked commitment and they noted corruption, lack of transparency, networking and inadequate evaluation of employees. The board lacked commitment and the president maintained his position by pleasing the board.

JU's governance was hampered by inexperienced staff throughout the hierarchy although top management did support their lower level staff. Quality assurance was impossible without minimal staff and facilities.

In 2012, AAU announced extensive reforms to their governance. The president would remain the chief executive officer. The post of college director would be removed and the duties undertaken by the college dean who would be chief executive officer of the college. The chain of command would be reduced from six or more layers to two layers below vice-president. The new structure would be: a) governing board, b) president with inputs from senate, managing council and university council, c) four vice-presidents, an executive director for the college of health sciences, institutes of technology and institute of peace and security studies would report to the president, d) colleges/institutes would report to the president, and e) departments/schools/centres would report to colleges/institutes. Research units which had become teaching units would revert to 75% research and 25% teaching.

==== Academic staff, resources and students ====
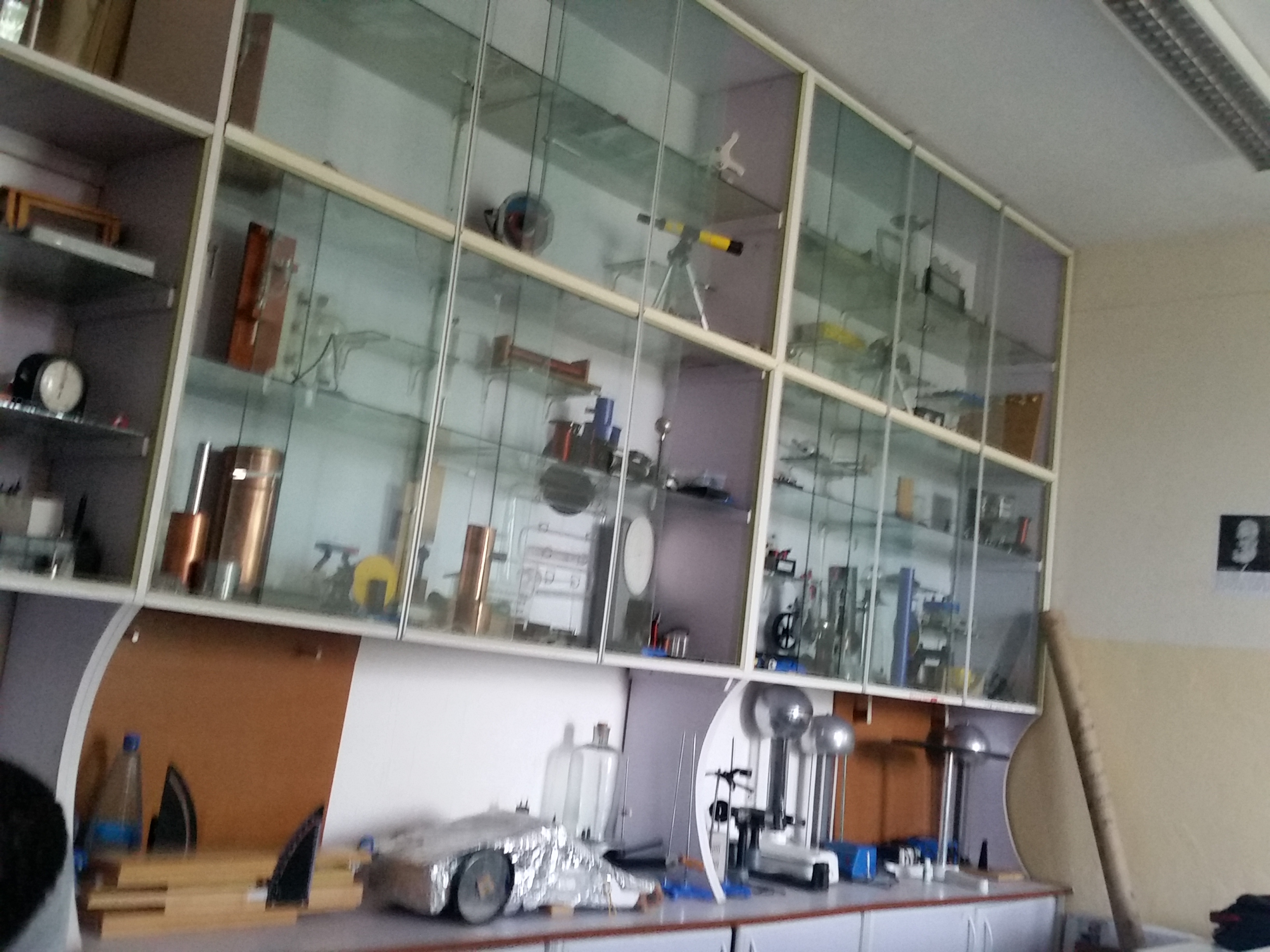
Shelves of equipment in a high school Physics Laboratory, Addis Ababa

In 2010, all academic staff were poorly paid and there were no incentives for good work or penalties for poor practice. At AAU, academic staff could increase their income with additional work outside the university. This was not stopped because it would result in loss of experienced teachers. There was resentment that Indian professors were paid more than twice as much as Ethiopian professors. MU had the potential for improvement but, given low pay and possible opportunities for work in new private colleges, they could soon resemble AAU. JU, being in a remote area, had no opportunities for outside work, so staff were fully engaged with their work but they would leave if given the opportunity. Staff thought teaching was not up-to-date or based on practice because research was not being done. Staff were relying on foreign teaching materials and textbooks which might not relate to the Ethiopian situation. Class sizes and resource shortages meant that laboratory work, practical work, field work, essays and projects were gradually being phased out. Courses were reduced to theory without practice thus encouraging rote learning to pass exams.

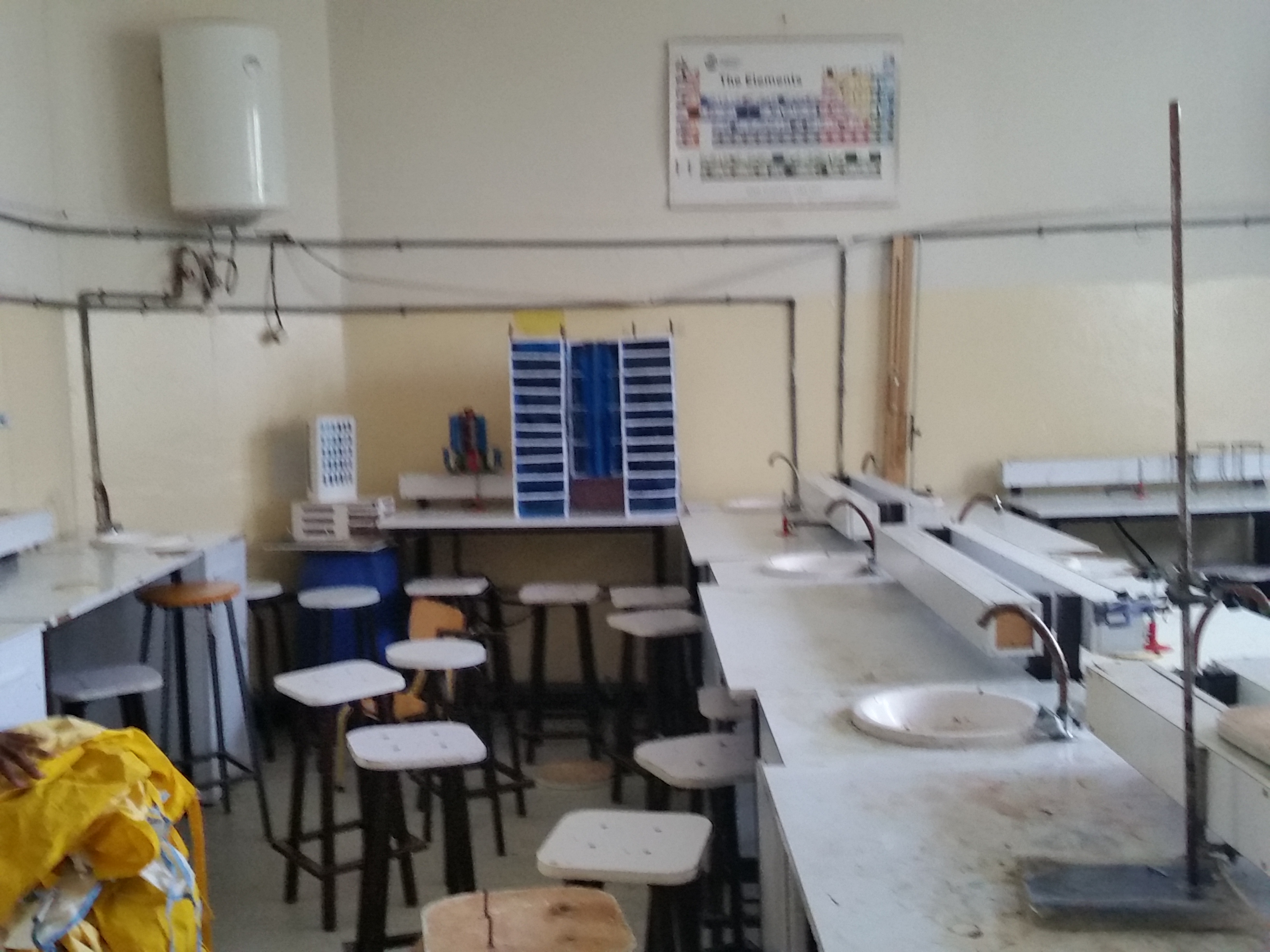
Laboratory for High School Science, Addis Ababa

All three universities suffered from poor resource. JU resource shortages were most severe with basic facilities still under construction. Students had to go to nearby Haramaya university. In 2007/08, MU only had 5 academic staff with PhDs while JU had one PhD AAU staff were advising MU students and JU students depended on Haramaya staff. All Ethiopian universities suffer from poor library facilities, large class sizes, and lack of equipment. The internet has the potential to access world knowledge but there is only one internet provider which is run by the government. All ICT suffers from poor connectivity and a shortage of technicians.

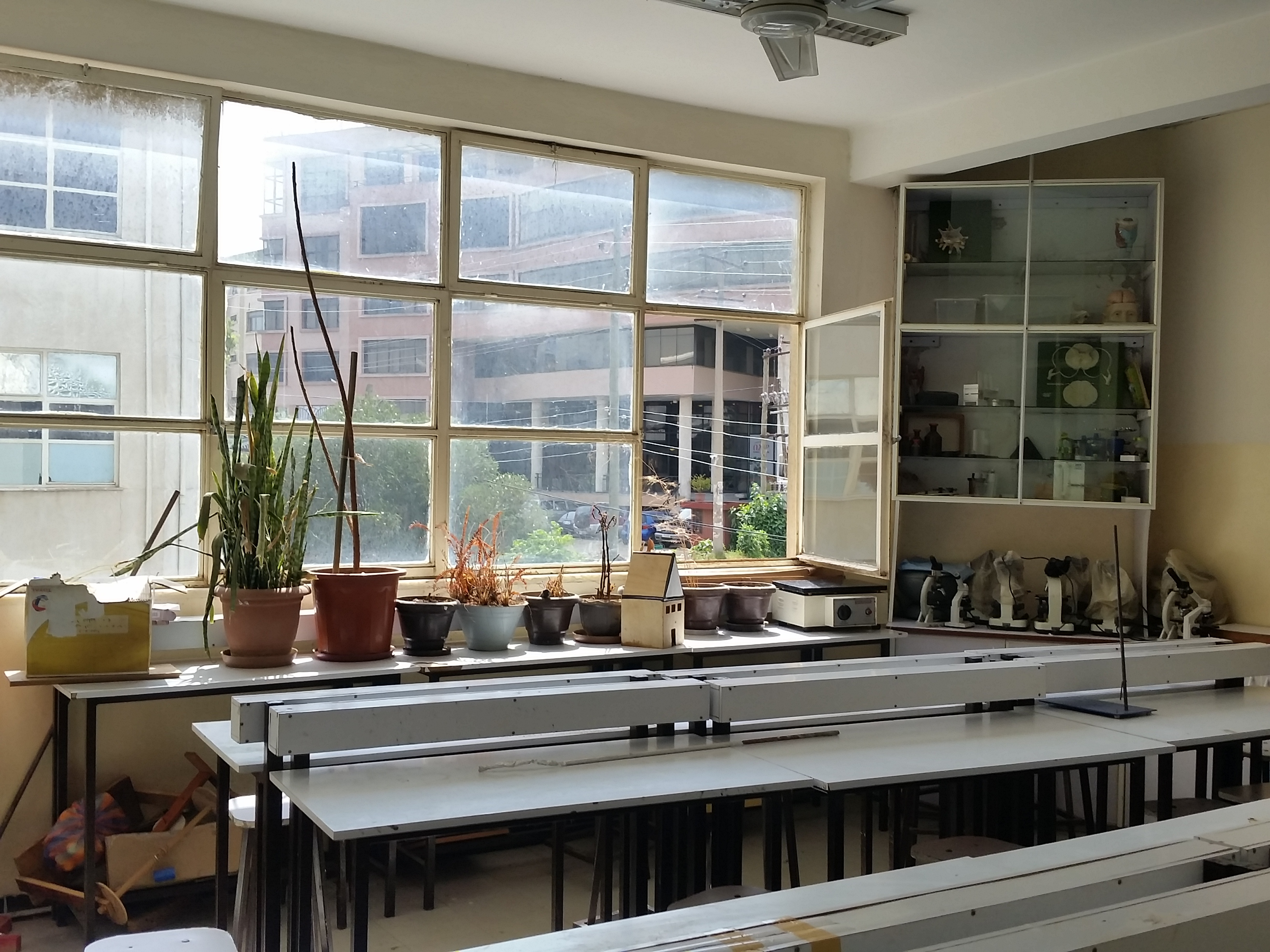
Plants in a Ethio-Parents' School Biology Laboratory, Addis Ababa

The MoE were selecting students inadequately prepared for university since 56.3% of students in 2008/09 and 50.6% of students in 2009/10 had not attained the required 50% minimum pass mark for university entrance. Students focused on obtaining diplomas and degrees since this was what society required. Student non-completion for those entering in 2007/08 were highest at AAU (33%), particularly for Physics (77%) and Economics (57%), followed by MU (29%) and JU (24%).

==== Corruption ====
All universities suffered from lack of resources but some of this was due to corruption. In 2009/10, AAU staff thought nepotism, patronage and abuse of resources was widespread. They noted that the number of administrators driving expensive cars around campus had increased. Inadequate planning from both government and universities allowed resource abuse to occur. Corruption was encouraged by social recognition for wealth and power rather than academic excellence. Some professors were opening private colleges and advising their students to attend them. Teachers were often absent from class and moonlighting to make up for poor pay. Teachers might award marks based on favoritism or ethnic and religious relationships. In on case, a female student reported an administrator for demanding sexual favors in exchange for passing her grade to the registrar. The administration could change a fail to a pass at the student's request. Corruption and lack of transparency were also observed at MU.

==== Mismatch between higher education and the employment market ====
The Ethiopian government concentrated on expanding higher education without due attention to the employment market. In 2013, there were 9,185 new engineering graduates but their training did not meet employer requirements. A HERQA survey in 2010 found that employers considered graduates in engineering, medicine and management were not sufficiently qualified for the work required. Graduates' only advantage was that they could be hired cheap. Higher education institutes were not responding to employer needs and there appeared to be no channel of communication between them. Furthermore, employers were overlooking recent graduates and only employing those with five years of work experience. In 2012 alone, 50,000 new graduates were released onto the job market which was too large a number to be absorbed by private or state institutions. Graduates from AAU were told to become self-employed if they could not find an employer. The African development bank sees this situation as a cause of discontent across North African countries.

It is possible to improve the match between graduate training and employer requirements when relevant organizations interact with university faculty and manage to obtain money for laboratories and equipment. The competence of medical laboratory technicians was improved in five Ethiopian universities. In-service training was too disruptive to normal services which already suffered from staff shortages. The Centre for Disease Control Ethiopia and the American Society for Clinical Pathology (ASCP) together with university faculty assessed medical laboratory education. The curriculum was revised and standardized to include practical training which formed part of the final assessment. Faculty staff were trained in grant writing and quality management systems. The United States President's fund for AIDS relief provided money for equipment, including an uninterrupted power supply and consumables. Lecturers were trained to use the new curriculum, improve their teaching skills and up-date their knowledge through website resources supplied by ASCP consultants. The result was graduate laboratory technicians who were confident, competent and skilled.

== Foreign students ==
There are education facilities for foreign residents, though foreign nationals are not accepted in the public schools of Ethiopia. However, there are quite a few private schools in Addis Ababa specifically for the children of foreign residents. Among them are Swedish Community School, Indian Community School, Bingham Academy, International Community School and Sandford International School, Flipper International School, Intellectual International School, One Planet International school and others.

== Core problems ==
Ethiopia faces many historical, cultural, social and political obstacles that have restricted progress in education for many centuries. According to UNESCO reviews, most people in Ethiopia feel that work is more important than education, so they start at a very early age with little to no education. Children in rural areas are less likely to go to school than children in urban areas. Though gradually improving, most rural families cannot afford to send their children to school because parents believe that while their children are in school they cannot contribute to the household chores and income. Social awareness that education is important is something that Ethiopia lacks but has improved gradually. There is a need to change the importance of education in the country's social structure, and children should be encouraged and required to attend school and become educated. The society of Ethiopia expects teachers and parents to use corporal punishment to maintain order and discipline. Most believe that through punishing children for bad habits they in turn learn good ones. Also since the mid-1970s there was a drastic loss of professionals who left the country, mostly for economic reasons. Many educated Ethiopians sought higher salaries in foreign countries thus many of those who managed to finish higher education emigrated from Ethiopia creating an endless shortage of qualified professionals in every sector of the country. Now the custom of sending academics abroad with the risk of a brain drain is being replaced by expansion of masters and doctoral programs to up-grade academic staff. Instead, foreigners have been funding programs for leadership, management and pedagogic skills or sending staff to help strengthen teaching and management practices.

== See also ==
- Category:Universities and colleges in Ethiopia
- List of universities and colleges in Ethiopia
