= German School =

German School may refer to:

- German School of Athens
- German School Bucharest (Deutsche Schule Bukarest)
- German School of Guayaquil
- German School Kuala Lumpur
- German School of Lisbon
- German School London
- German School Madrid
- German School of Milan
- German School New York
- German School of San Salvador
- German School Seoul International
- German School Washington, D.C. (DSW)

== See also ==
- German Embassy School (disambiguation)
- German International School (disambiguation)
