= Lideta Catholic Cathedral School =

- ልደታ ካቶሊክ ካቴድራል ትምህርት ቤት

Location
- Wawel St. 9.03093°N 38.74936°E; Addis Ababa; Ethiopia

Information
- Type: Private, coeducational
- Motto: Formation Of Integral Human Development
- Religious affiliation: Ethiopian Catholic Church
- Denomination: Catholic Church
- Established: 1954
- Principal: Dr. Tekle Mekonen
- Cardinal: Berhaneyesus Demerew Souraphile
- Grades: 1–12
- Language: English, Amharic
- Color: Navy
- Slogan: Once a Cathenian, always a Cathenian
- Nickname: Cathenians
- Team name: Cathenians
- Newspaper: Cathe Times

Lideta Catholic Cathedral School (Nativity Boys School) is a private primary and secondary school in Addis Ababa, Ethiopia. Founded in 1954, it is affiliated with the Catholic Church of Ethiopia.

== Notable alumni ==
- Michael Tsegaye, photographer
- Gedion Timotheos, Attorney General

== See also ==
- St Joseph's School, Addis Ababa
- List of schools in Ethiopia
- Education in Ethiopia
