= St Joseph's School, Addis Ababa =

St. Joseph's School, Addis Ababa
- Amharic: ቅዱስ ዮሴፍ ትምህርት ቤት
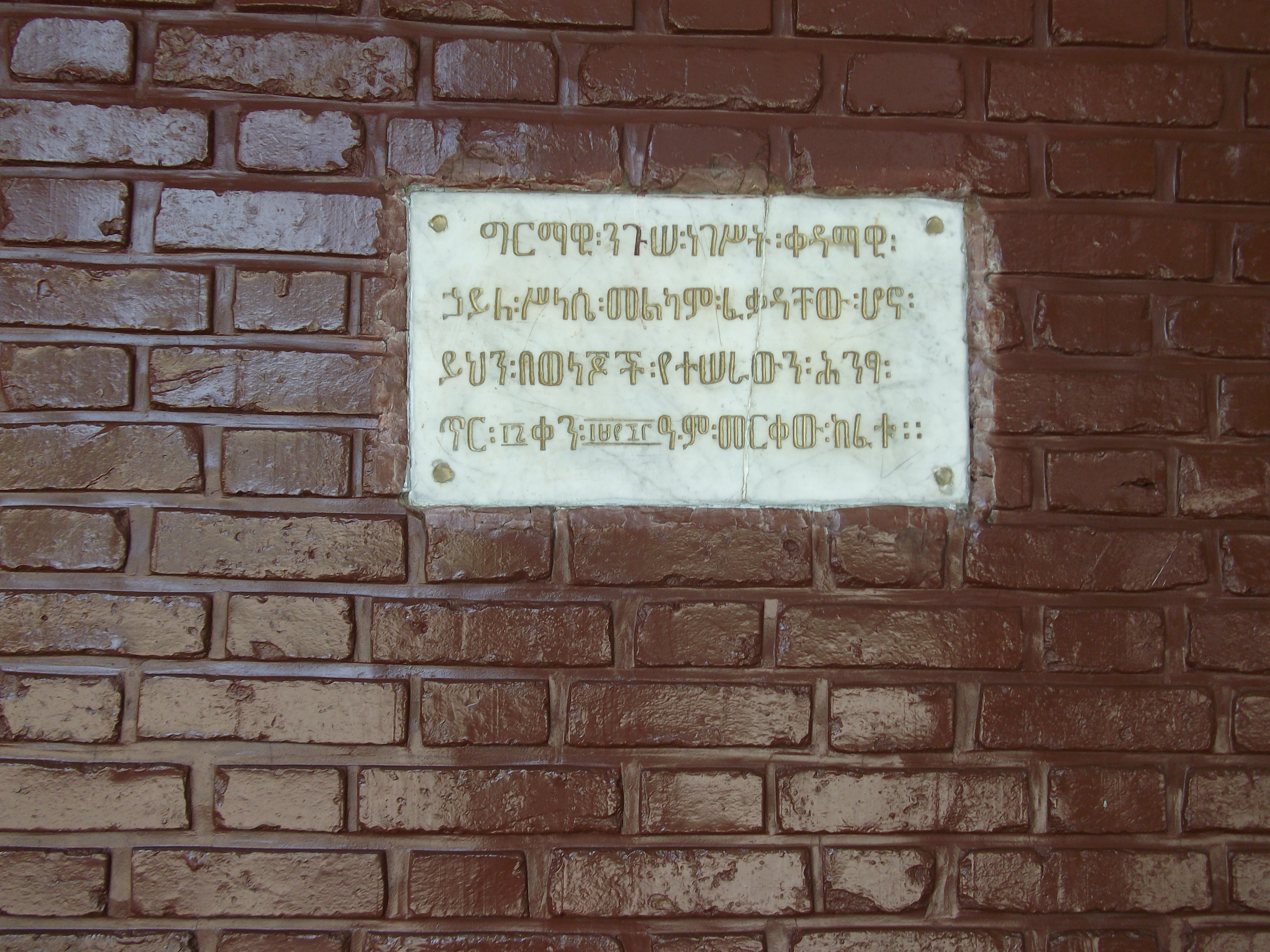
- Plaque commemorating the inauguration of the high school building by Emperor Haile Selassie
- Meskel Square, Addis Ababa; Ethiopia

Information
- Type: Private primary and secondary school
- Religious affiliation: Catholicism
- Denomination: Lasallian Brothers
- Established: 1959 (67 years ago)
- Founder: Institute of the Brothers of the Christian Schools
- President: Brother Getachew Alemayehu
- Gender: Boys
- Enrollment: 1,600
- Website: www.saintjoseph-aa.com

St Joseph's School, Addis Ababa, is a private Catholic primary and secondary school for boys, located near Meskel Square, in Addis Ababa, Ethiopia. Founded by the Institute of the Brothers of the Christian Schools, more commonly known as the Lasallian Brothers, in 1959, the school continues to be operated by the Brothers who provide education to approximately 2,000 boys. Scholarships enable needy and deserving students to attend the school.

== History ==
The school was founded in 1959 by the Lasallian Brothers and was staffed by American Brothers. Established for the wealthy and ruling class, after the revolution in the 1970s the school mainly caters to the children of civil servants and small traders.

The school enrolls 1,600 boys, with classes between grades 1 and 12. Currently, the school is staffed almost entirely by lay teachers including the administration. There are around 40 students per class. With 3-4 classes per section, teachers see 120-160 students every day. St. Joseph School has a reputation for academic excellence and for its students having the best academic performances in the country. Top scorers on high school national examinations are often from St. Joseph. With its ambitious motto “High Expectations from All, High Standards for All” the school has maintained a 100 percent graduation rate and a 100 percent admission to prestigious national and international universities like Harvard University, Yale University, Columbia University, University of Pennsylvania, Cornell University, Amherst College, and Williams College. This reputation places St. Joseph School in high demand

The Lasallian Brothers conduct schools and colleges all over the world in eighty countries including five schools in Ethiopia: (Dire Dawa, Addis Ababa (2), Adama and the Meki Catholic School ( located in the town of Meki )

== See also ==
- Education in Ethiopia
- List of schools in Ethiopia
- Lideta Catholic Cathedral School
