= Ethiopian National Literacy Campaign =

1979–1991 Ethiopian Derg adult literacy programme

- Date: July 1979 – 1991
- Location: Ethiopia
- Also known as: ENLC
- Participants: 18,209,779 registered participants; 1,521,489 campaigners
- Outcome: National literacy rate raised from 7% (1973) to 62.4% (1986); UNESCO International Reading Association Literacy Prize

The Ethiopian National Literacy Campaign (ENLC) was a mass adult literacy programme conducted by the government of the People's Democratic Republic of Ethiopia between July 1979 and 1991. Directed toward the elimination of illiteracy among the economically active population between the ages of 15 and 65, it was conducted in 15 Ethiopian languages covering the mother tongues of more than 90 percent of the Ethiopian people. By August 1986, over 18 million people had registered for the programme and the national literacy rate had risen from approximately 7 percent in 1973 to 62.4 percent. The campaign won UNESCO's International Reading Association Literacy Prize and represented, in the words of the Encyclopaedia Aethiopica, the first sustained and comprehensive effort in Ethiopia's two thousand years of literate history to prepare scripts and teaching materials for the country's major languages.

== Background ==
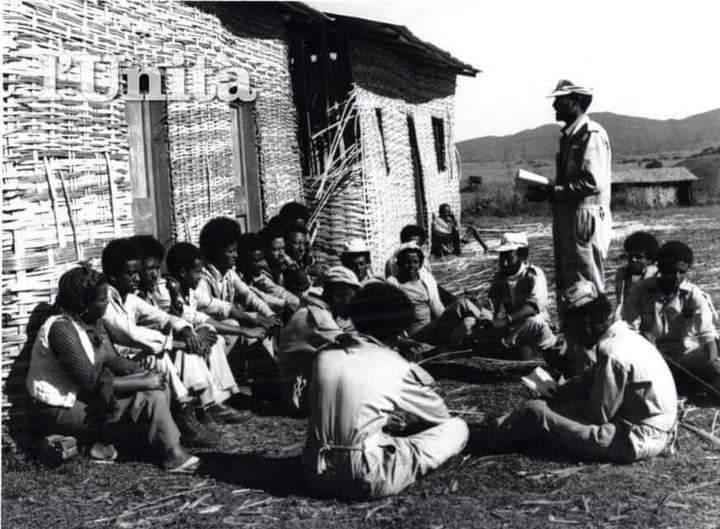
An instructor conducts an outdoor literacy class for rural adults during the Ethiopian National Literacy Campaign, c. 1980. Photo published in the Italian newspaper l'Unità.

By 1973, the adult illiteracy rate in Ethiopia stood at approximately 93 percent. Earlier efforts had been limited. In 1955 an imperial edict demanded literacy pursuits and a National Literacy Campaign Committee was established, but by 1965 the illiteracy rate among the male population over 15 was still approximately 92 percent.

The Ethiopian Revolution of 1974 and the Derg's Programme of the National Democratic Revolution of Ethiopia made literacy elimination a stated priority: "There will be an educational programme that will provide free education, step by step, to the broad masses. All necessary measures to eliminate illiteracy will be undertaken." Between 1974 and 1984 the number of primary schools more than doubled. By 1982/83, more than 3,000,000 children were enrolled in primary and secondary schools staffed by nearly 50,000 teachers.

The Zämäča of December 1974, a two-year mass mobilisation campaign that sent approximately 60,000 students and teachers to rural localities, served as the direct forerunner of the ENLC. The experience of that campaign was pivotal in the design and implementation of the more extensive programme that followed.

== Organisation ==
The ENLC was launched in July 1979 and was organised into two six-monthly rounds per year. Its organisational structure was highly centralised and complex, coordinated through the National Literacy Campaign Coordinating Committee (NLCCC).

The campaign used 15 Ethiopian languages designated to cover the mother tongues of more than 90 percent of the Ethiopian population, and widely known as second or third languages by the remaining population:

- Amharic
- Oromiffa
- Tégréñña
- Wälaytta
- Somali
- Sidaama
- Hadiyya
- Sélti
- Kambaata
- ʿAfar
- Tégre
- Gideýo
- Käfa
- Saho
- Kunama

Textbooks in all 15 languages were prepared, many of them for the first time, employing the Ethiopic syllabary. Among the means used to sustain literacy skills were reading centres, adult and rural schools, and post-literacy courses. Follow-up material in the same 15 languages was prepared for post-literacy participants. Teaching aids were also produced at local levels.

During the campaign, participants were taught to read and write. Those who achieved literacy could also take post-literacy courses in the same languages.

== Results ==
By August 1983, after nine completed rounds, a total of 9.57 million adults had been made literate.

By August 1986, after 14 completed rounds, the results were as follows:

Category	Figure
Total registered	18,209,779
Certified literate	13,770,894
Campaigners	1,521,489
Campaign centres	278,396
Post-literacy registered	10,427,011
Post-literacy completed	7,948,705
National literacy rate	62.4%
Urban literacy rate	84.5%
Rural literacy rate	59.6%

In rounds 1 through 14, the total number of books distributed in 15 languages reached 43,327,615, of which 28,623,822 were for literacy instruction and 14,703,793 for post-literacy.

== Recognition ==
The ENLC received UNESCO's International Reading Association Literacy Prize in recognition of the effective mobilisation of the resources of Ethiopian society, the systematic planning of literacy work conceived within a framework of life-long education, the preparation of innovative literacy materials in several Ethiopian languages, and the positive impact of the campaign on the national life of Ethiopia.

== Legacy and limitations ==
The encyclopaedia notes that while the ENLC represented a historic achievement in multilingual education, its gains were not consolidated in the formal school system. Amharic and English remained the medium of instruction at the elementary and secondary levels, and local languages were not incorporated into formal schooling. This, alongside other factors, contributed to a decline in enrolment at both primary and secondary levels in the late 1980s.

By the 1994 census, only 23.4 percent of the population aged 10 and over were literate, a significant reversal from the 62.4 percent recorded in 1986 and a reflection of the rapid population growth of the intervening decade.

A 1987 national evaluation found that only 39.3 percent of literacy classes were satisfactorily supplied with books while 52.5 percent were poorly supplied. Surveys documented a growing tendency among neo-literates to revert to illiteracy, particularly among those over 40.

One peasant who had become literate during the 1974–75 Zämäča but later relapsed stated that he had neither reading materials nor any practical need to use his new skill, and expressed doubt about whether education had any value for his children.

In the 1990s, the government of the Federal Democratic Republic of Ethiopia adopted a new approach to education and literacy, incorporating local languages into formal schooling as part of the new federal educational framework.

== See also ==
- Derg
- Zämäča
- Ethiopian Revolution
- Education in Ethiopia
- People's Democratic Republic of Ethiopia

== Sources ==
- Uhlig, Siegbert (2007). Encyclopaedia Aethiopica: Volume 3: He-N. Harrassowitz Verlag. pp. 585–588.
- Amare, Germa (1991). "An Appraisal of the On-Going Literacy Campaign in Ethiopia". Northeast African Studies. 13 (2/3): 69–99.
