= Michael Tsegaye =

Ethiopian artist and photographer (born 1975)

- Born: Michael Tsegaye; April 26, 1975 (age 50); Addis Ababa, Socialist Ethiopia
- Known for: Photography
- Website: www.michaeltsegaye.com

Michael Tsegaye (born 1975 in Addis Ababa) is an Ethiopian artist and photographer. Much of his work presents a glimpse of life in contemporary Ethiopia, although an extended catalogue of his images come from his travels abroad.

== Biography ==
Tsegaye grew up in Addis Ababa where he attended Cathedral Elementary and Tikur Anbessa High School. He enrolled in the Economics Department of Addis Abeba University before transferring to its School of Fine Arts and Design. There, he received his diploma in painting in 2002, but soon gave up painting after he developed a severe allergy to oil paint. He subsequently found photography.

Tsegaye has worked for the publications Der Spiegel, Jeune Afrique, and enorm; as well as the press agencies Bloomberg and Reuters. Since 2006, he has also worked for the NGOs Médecins Sans Frontières, UNESCO and GIZ. From 2007 to 2008 he was employed with GIZ's Engineering Capacity Building Project (ECBP) in Addis Ababa.

Besides his professional work, Tsegaye is also an artist who focuses on social documentary and art photography. His work can be found in Snap Judgments: New Directions in African Photography, edited by Okwui Enwezor, and published by the International Centre for Photography in New York City in 2007. He was an artist-in-residence at the Thami Mnyele Foundation in 2010.

== Awards ==
In 2011, Tsegaye won the first place award for the European Union-African Union Professional Photography Competition as a representative for Eastern Africa.

== Exhibited works ==
=== Group exhibitions ===
- 2012

- Future Makers, National Museum. Addis Ababa, Ethiopia.
- Offside Effects, Triennale. Tbilisi, Georgia.
- Temoine: Witness, Goethe Cultural Institute. Johannesburg, South Africa.
- Face2Face, BOZAR/European Union (AU Summit/Lela Gallery). Addis Abeba, Ethiopia.

- 2011

- For a Sustainable World, Rencontres de Bamako, African Photography Biennial 9th Edition. Bamako, Mali.
- Photoquai 2011, Musée du quai Branly. Paris, France.
- Neoscape, Atelier Gallery. Addis Abeba, Ethiopia.

- 2010

- African Journey, Galerie Sanaa. Utrecht, Netherlands.
- Selam Arts Festival. Toronto, Canada.
- Visual Arts: Africa-World. Luanda, Angola.
- Arte invisible/ARCO. Madrid, Spain.
- H*tel Dystopia Room #25/55: Al Bastakiya Art Fair. Dubai, UAE.

- 2009

- Aksum Rediscovered: the Reinstallation of the Obelisk, UNESCO House. Paris, France.
- Sicherheit Entwickeln–Entwicklung Sichern, GTZ House. Berlin, Germany.
- Spot on …Bamako VII. Rencontres Africaines de la Photographie, Institute for 2009: Foreign Cultural Relations. Berlin and Stuttgart, Germany.

- 2008

- Snap Judgments: Nieuwe standpunten in hedendaagse Afrikaans fotografie / New Positions in Contemporary African Photography, Het Stedelijk 2008 : 2008 : Museum. Amsterdam, Netherlands.
- Snap Judgments : New Positions in Contemporary African Photography, Brooks 2008 : Museum of Art. Memphis, TN, U.S.A.

- 2007

- Africa=Hot, Oude Kerk, World Press Photo Exhibition. Amsterdam, Netherlands.
- Africa=Hot, Tour & Taxis, World Press Photo Exhibition. Brussels, Belgium.
- VII Rencontres Afrcaines de la photographie: In the city and beyond. Bamako, Mali.
- Ethiopia on the Move, National Museum of Ethnology. Leiden, Netherlands.
- Engineering Tomorrow, Addis Ababa University, Faculty of Technology. Addis Ababa, Ethiopia.
- Snap Judgments: New Positions in Contemporary African Photography. Museo Tamayo. Mexico City, Mexico.

- 2006

- Snap Judgments: New Positions in Contemporary African Photography. Miami Art Central. Miami, Florida, USA.
- Snap Judgments: New Positions in Contemporary African Photography. International Centre of Photography. New York, USA.
- Kwas Meda, Goethe-Institute, Gebrekristos Desta Centre. Addis Ababa, Ethiopia.

- 2005

- Religious Ceremonies, Royal Netherlands Embassy. Addis Ababa, Ethiopia.
- Colours In Us, Alliance Éthio-Française. Dire Dawa, Ethiopia.

- 2004

- Expressions 2, Bulgarian Embassy. Addis Ababa, Ethiopia.
- Guramayle, Alem Art Gallery. Addis Ababa, Ethiopia.
- Expressions, Alem Art Gallery. Addis Ababa, Ethiopia.
- Art for Solidarity, German School. Addis Ababa, Ethiopia.

- 2003

- Foreign, Goethe-Institute, Gebrekristos Desta Centre. Addis Ababa, Ethiopia.
- Self-portrait, Alliance Éthio-Française. Addis Ababa, Ethiopia.
- Faces and Identities, Goethe-Institute. Gebrekristos Desta Centre, Addis Ababa.

=== Solo exhibitions ===
- 2011

- Medecins Sans Frontiers, National Museum. Addis Abeba, Ethiopia.

- 2008

- Made in Ethiopia, GTZ Headquarters. Frankfurt, Germany.

- 2007

- Facets, Economic Commission for Africa. Addis Ababa, Ethiopia.
- Made in Ethiopia, Engineering Capacity Building Program (ecbp). Addis Ababa, Ethiopia.

- 2003

- Out of the Blue, Goethe-Institute, Gebrekristos Desta Centre. Addis Ababa, Ethiopia.

- 2002

- Visions of Addis, Goethe-Institute, Gebrekristos Desta Centre, Addis Ababa, Ethiopia.
