= Germany–Romania relations =

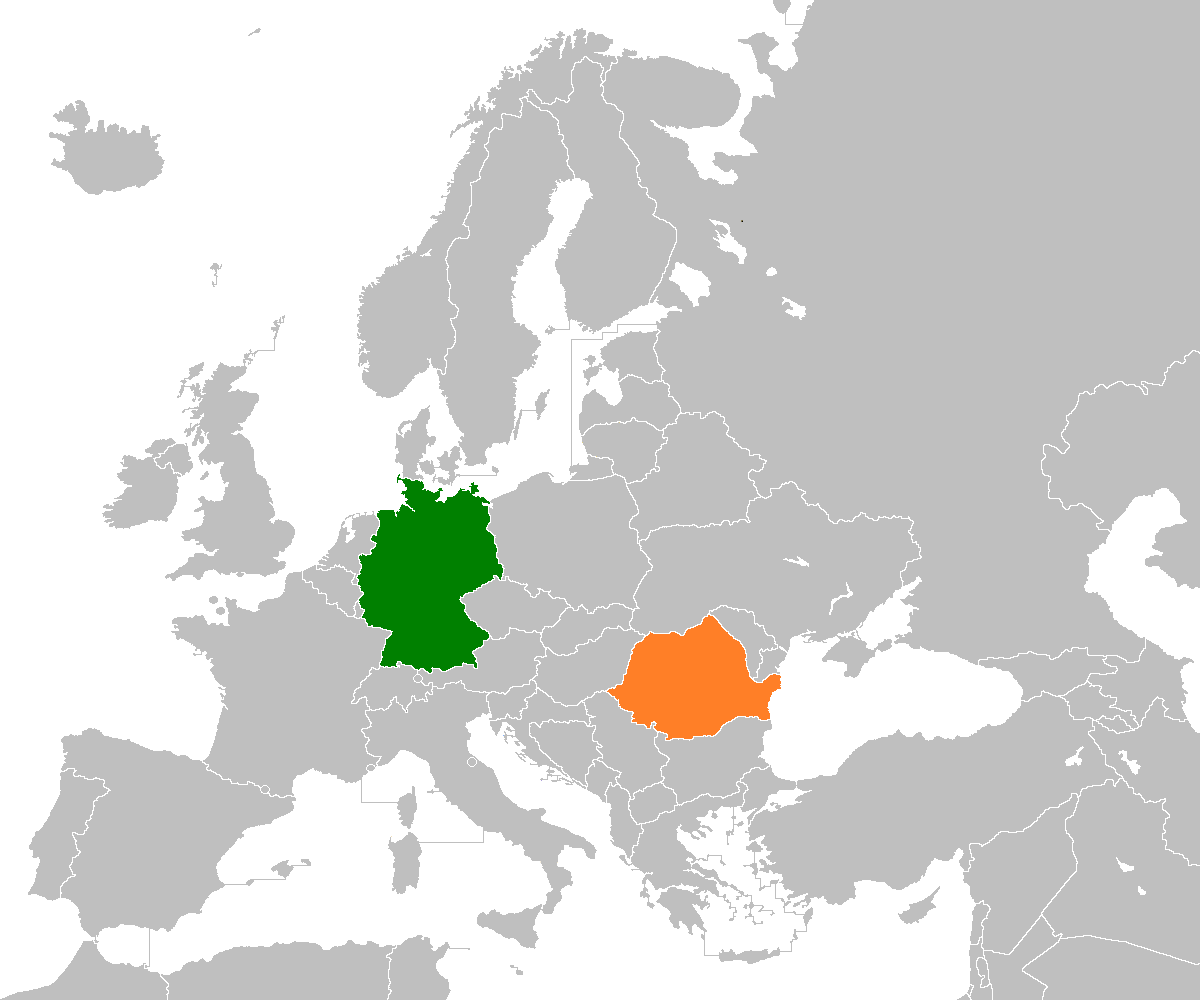

- Germany: Romania

Diplomatic relations between Germany and Romania began on 20 February 1880, when, following the Congress of Berlin, the German Empire recognized the independence of the Romanian United Principalities.

Romania joined the Axis powers in November 1940, but following the coup d'état of August 1944 switched sides and fought side by side with the Soviets until the Red Army reached Berlin. Between 1967 and 1989, West Germany invested an estimated billion West German Marks to ransom the Germans of Romania, permitting a total of 226,654 Germans to leave Communist Romania.

There is a German international school in Bucharest: Deutsche Schule Bukarest. Romania has the Romanian Cultural Institute "Titu Maiorescu" in Berlin. Both countries are full members of the Council of Europe, the European Union and NATO.

== 19^{th} century and early 20^{th} century ==
Romania opened official diplomatic relations with Germany and many other countries in 1880, but ties go back to before German Unification. The Romanian Royal Family was part of the Sigmaringen branch of the Hohenzollern dynasty. On 30 October 1883, Romania unofficially joined the Triple Alliance, a defensive alliance between the German Empire, Austria-Hungary and the Kingdom of Italy, which lasted until 1915. In 1916, Romania entered the First World War as an ally of the Triple Entente. German troops then occupied the Romanian capital of Bucharest.

== Nazi Germany's ally ==
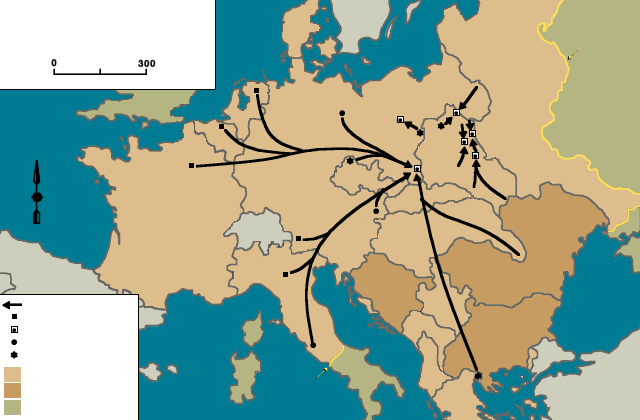
Nazi Germany in 1944 (light brown) and its allies (dark brown)

After the coup of September 1940, the new regime joined the Axis powers and, in June 1941 joined Germany's Operation Barbarossa to conquer the Soviet Union. Romania in World War II supplied petroleum, equipment and more troops to the invasion than any other Axis power.

After the September 1943 Armistice of Cassibile with Italy, Romania became the second Axis Power in Europe. The Romanians shared in the spoils of Operation Achse, Regia Marina's 5 CB-class midget submarines in the Black Sea being transferred to the Romanian Navy. Romania also captured 496 Italians, mostly naval personnel (2 of them later died). Before the month was out, Germany had agreed to systematically supply the Romanian Army with German military vehicles, via the Olivenbaum I-III and Quittenbaum I programs. Deliveries started in November 1943, and by August 1944, Germany had supplied Romania with 10 times more armored vehicles (Panzer III, Panzer IV, and Sturmgeschütz III) than during the entire pre-Cassibile period. Having acquired the license to produce the Messerschmitt Bf 109, Romania planned to assemble 75 from German parts. Deliveries began in May 1944, but only 6 were completed before Romania left the Axis in August 1944. Eleven more were completed by the end of the war with the remaining 58 completed after the war.

In 1944, Romania had also gained access to certain Wunderwaffen, such as the Werfer-Granate 21. The first Romanian-made Fiesler Storch was completed in October 1943, followed by 9 more by May 1944. From March 1944, Germany also contributed to the design and construction of the M-05 and M-06 prototypes of the Mareșal tank destroyer: Alkett contributed to the Romanian design team and Telefunken radios along with Böhler armor were provided. The 75 mm Reșița gun (production started at the end of 1943) used the projectile chamber of the German Pak 40. Technology transfers between the two countries were not necessarily one-way, however. On 6 January 1944, Antonescu showed Hitler the plans of the M-04 prototype of the Mareșal tank destroyer. In May 1944, Lieutenant-Colonel Ventz from the Waffenamt acknowledged that the Hetzer had followed the Romanian design. German-led Army Group South Ukraine could not take major operational decisions without securing Ion Antonescu's approval, even as late as 22 August 1944 (the day before he was dismissed). An entire German army (the 6^{th}) came under Romanian command in May 1944, when it became part of Romanian general Petre Dumitrescu's Armeegruppe. For the first time in the war, German commanders came under the actual (rather than nominal) command of their foreign allies. This Romanian-led army group had 24 divisions, of which 17 were German.

== Resident diplomatic missions ==
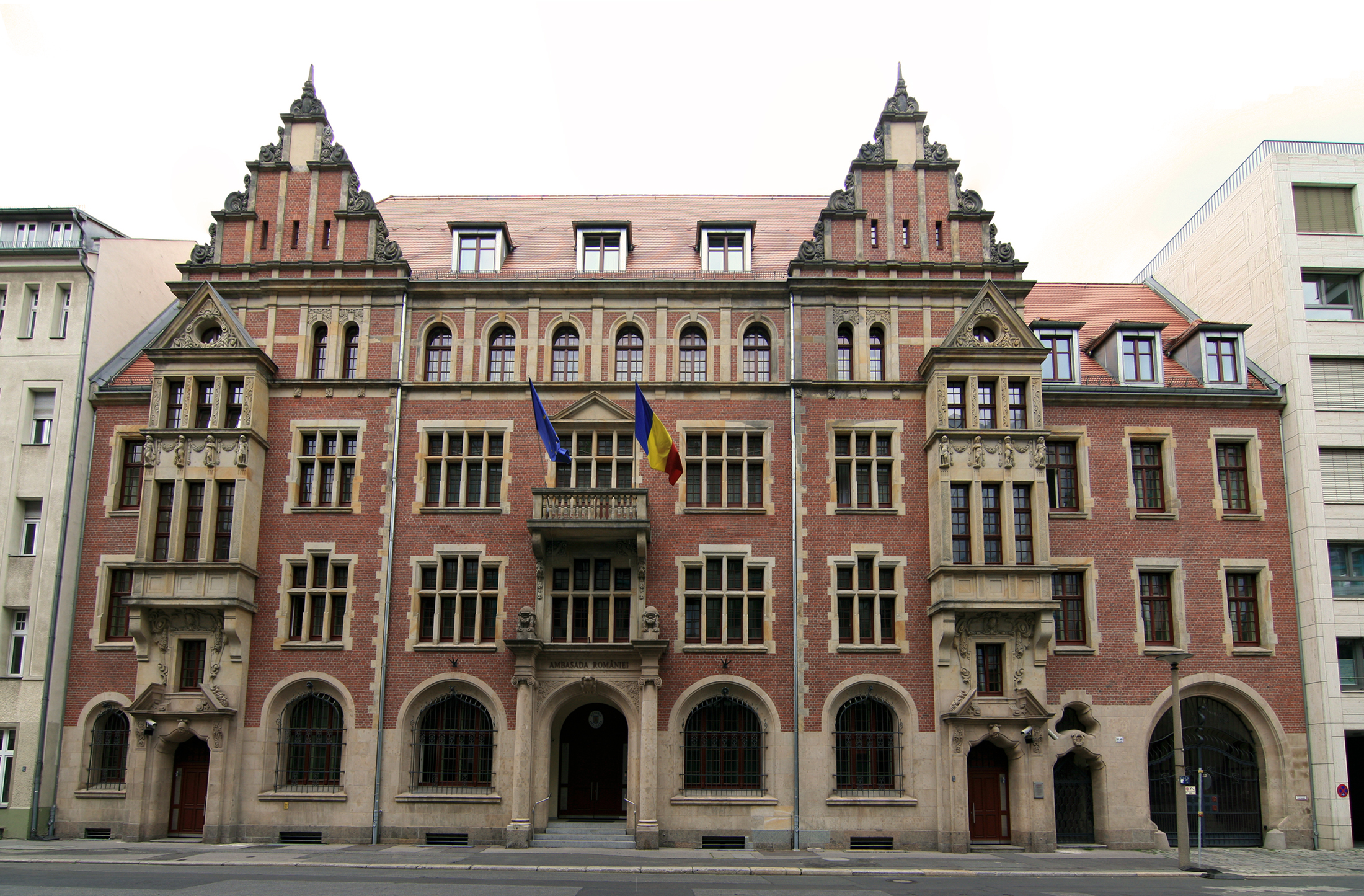
Embassy of Romania in Berlin

- Germany has an embassy in Bucharest and consulates-general in Sibiu and Timișoara.
- Romania has an embassy in Berlin and consulates-general in: Bonn, Munich and Stuttgart.

== NATO member ==
The German Air Force has supported NATO's air policing mission in Romania in the past. Following Russia's invasion of Ukraine in 2022 AD, Germany started deploying four Eurofighter jets to Romania to support the air policing mission, hosted at a military base near Constanța.

== See also ==
- Foreign relations of Germany
- Foreign relations of Romania
- German Military Mission in Romania
- List of ambassadors of Germany to Romania
- Romanians in Germany
- Germans of Romania
