= German Embassy School =

German Embassy School or Deutsche Botschaftsschule may refer to:

- German Embassy School Addis Ababa
- Deutsche Botschaftsschule Peking (Beijing)
- German Embassy School Tehran

== See also ==
- German International School (disambiguation)
- German School (disambiguation)
