= Ethiopian Records =

Ethiopian DJ and producer

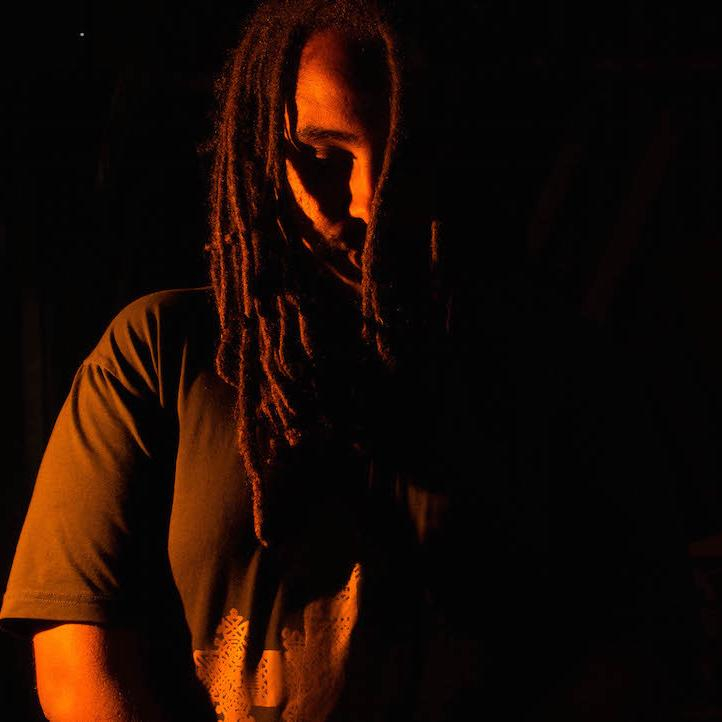

Background information
- Birth name: Endeguena Mulu
- Born: 1987 (age 37–38) Addis Ababa, PDR Ethiopia
- Genres: Electronic; Ethiopian music

Endeguena Mulu (born 1987), known by his stage name Ethiopian Records, is an Ethiopian music producer.

== Early life ==
He was born in Addis Abeba, in Feluha and was raised there. His debut EP Qen Sew (2014), was released on 1432R.

He first started making music while in high school, experimenting with a wide spectrum of sound palettes. Endeguena started experimenting with Ethiopian Traditional Music from all corners of his country while he was studying in college and experimentation is still his main approach.

Ethiopiyawi electronic (sometimes spelled Ethiopiawi Electronic) is a genre that uses Electronic Music tools, and Music Technology to make music that is very deeply rooted in the music from all over Ethiopia. One of the main pillars of the genre is Azmari Culture. Ethiopiyawi means Ethiopian in Amharic.

In an artist statement Ethiopian Records published in 2015, he affirmed that his music aims to transcend constraints of genre and geography, declaring that the label ‘Ethiopiyawi electronic’ refers, “more to the process and not to the outcome” of his experimentations.

== Career ==
Ethiopian Records has his roots in traditional music, Ethiopian contemporary music and computer-made music. He has been making music since he was a teenager, he first started making music when he was 16. His sound as a teenager was first rooted in mixing genres like dub, reggae, hip hop, trance, DnB, ambient music, industrial, and a string of different genres with Ethiopian contemporary and traditional music but he grew into exploring creating something out of the purely Ethiopian and African. He started performing in 2014 in different clubs and venues in his hometown Addis Ababa.

His first release was an EP with the Washington Record Label 1432 R entitled Qen Sew in 2014, since then he has released two other EPs' with the same label called Letu Sinega and Benqelf Lebe/ In my sleep.

Ethiopian Records released his fourth EP album on Warp Records' offshoot Arcola on 21 June 2018.
