= Zagol Academy =

Location
- P.O. Box: 6669; Addis Ababa; Ethiopia; 9°1′21.46″N 38°51′34.59″E

Information
- Established: 2009
- Head of school: Elias Lewetegn
- Grades: LKG1–8
- Website: www.zagolacademy.com

Zagol Academy is a private educational institution concentrating in both English and Amharic, located in Addis Ababa, Ethiopia, offering Lower Kindergarten through 8th grade.

== History ==
The school was founded in 2009 under the leadership of Elias Lewetegn and Tsegay Denboba. Elias Lewetegn has a master's degree (MSc) in Physics and Math from Addis Ababa University. His research in renewable energy, particularly solar cells has been published by the international journal Renewable Energy. Tsegay Denboba spent eight years in the Ministry of Education as a high school teacher and a Senior Research Expert in Distance Education and 25 years in the Ethiopian Mapping Agency, reaching Head of the Planning Department. He has a BA in Geography from Addis Ababa University's Faculty of Education and an MSc in Research Development Planning from the International Institute for Geo-Information Science and Earth Observation (ITC) in the Netherlands.

== Campus ==
Zagol Academy has two campuses, one for Lower KG 1, Lower KG 2 and KG and one for its primary and middle school (grades 1-8). Both campuses are located midway between CMC and Ayat (Meri), near Gift Real-Estate.

== Curriculum ==
The curriculum of Zagol Academy follows the curriculum established by the Ministry of Education with a focus on English, creative thinking, teamwork and technology.
