= Deutsche Schule der Borromäerinnen =

Deutsche Schule der Borromäerinnen may refer to:

- Deutsche Schule der Borromäerinnen Kairo (German International School of Cairo)
- Deutsche Schule der Borromäerinnen Alexandria
