= Adult and Non-Formal Education Association in Ethiopia =

Non-governmental organization in Ethiopia

Adult and Non-Formal Education Association in Ethiopia (ANFEAE) is a non-governmental organization that was established to promote sustainable development through the promotion of basic education in youths across Ethiopia. ANFEAE works with community-based institutions to help with implementation and management of educational projects, advocacy, educational training, material development, and networking and research. ANFEAE has regional project offices in Gambela, Oromia, Benishangul Gumuz and Amhara regional states. Since its establishment, the organization has trained 1,200 civil servants and published 17 training manuals into four national languages.

== Mission ==
ANFEAE works to tackle the major educational challenges that Ethiopia confronts by implementing and helping manage education projects. UNESCO outlines the basic structure of such programs in ANFEAE:

Educational material is developed by a group consisting of teachers, learners and representatives from health and agriculture organizations. The training course lasts two years (300 hours of instruction in all) in classes of 25 participants, and costs a total of US$240,000, or less than US$40 per pupil. Funds come from USAID Via Pact Ethiopia, SIDA Via Pact Ethiopia, the Addis Abeba, World Bank-Small Grant Programme as well as donations from ANFEAE members. Some former learners become teachers, after a month's training. Each is responsible for 50 pupils and receives a monthly salary of US$45.

ANFAE's mission is to "help economic and social development of the country through promoting Life Long Learning and facilitating quality and life-enhancing education and training for adults, the youth and children in rural and urban areas of Ethiopia." ANFEAE cites numerous outlets through which education in Ethiopia can be cultivated and enhanced: capacity building, research and documentation, women and empowerment, cross cutting issues, and networking and partnership. The goal is to promote community-based organizations, grassroots governmental institutions, literacy and learning initiatives among women, HIV/AIDS awareness, and the establishment and strengthening of partnerships and networks among educational institutions and communities.

== Recognition ==
In 2008, ANFEAE won the UNESCO International Literacy Prize for its Literacy Plus project. The project was based on the initiative that "women are the future of mankind." According to EAEA, Literacy Plus is a women's empowerment program that “combines business, banking, peace building, conflict resolution, malaria control, animal management and literacy, a program in which women become social activists and social entrepreneurs, effective leaders who are bringing about change in their community.” Through this project, ANFEAE helped empower over 6,200 rural poor women by helping them acquire relevant literacy and business and management-related skills. According to ANFEAE director Alemayehu Haily Gebre, a survey of 3,000 women, out of the total 6,200, showed that half of them (over 1,500) increased their revenues by 25%.
