= German International School Abu Dhabi =

School in United Arab Emirates

Coordinates: 24.4664°N 54.3608°E

- German: Deutsche Internationale Schule Abu Dhabi; Arabic: المدرسة الألمانية الدولية

Information
- Established: 1976; 50 years ago
- Language: German; English; Arabic
- Website: gisad.ae

The German International School Abu Dhabi (GISAD; German: Deutsche Internationale Schule Abu Dhabi, Arabic: المدرسة الألمانية الدولية) is a German international school located in central Abu Dhabi, United Arab Emirates.

The GISAD is certified by the Kultusministerkonferenz (KMK), which is the assembly of ministers of education of the German states. Students at GISAD can attend either Kindergarten, Grundschule, Sekundarstufe I and Sekundarstufe II (kindergarten, primary school, lower secondary level and upper secondary level).

== The history of the GISAD ==
GISAD was founded in 1976. In 2006/2007, the GISAD was officially recognized as part of the German schools abroad network.

== Language Integration at GISAD ==
The school career path is characterized by the fact that linguistic skills are very specifically promoted as early as in the kindergarten. For some children, the first priority is to become fluent in the German language. In addition, the offer “Arabic for native speakers” begins in kindergarten. The German-speaking children receive language support tailored to their needs with a wide range of educational opportunities and English lessons from the very beginning. From the first grade on, the lessons are German-speaking. Only children who have a good command of German can transfer to the GISAD primary school. However, the GISAD offers additional linguistic support to students with a different first language during and after lessons, this program is called the Linguistic Integration Program] (LIP). The LIP is tailored such that children without former experience with the German language may integrate into the German school system to attain a German graduate diploma or the "German Language Diploma" (DSD). The DSD enables students who pass the DSD at level B1 and to attend a preparatory course at a German university. GISAD is the only German school in the region that offers the DSD.

The LIP is organized so that students can be integrated in one of two ways, depending on their German language background.

Entry is possible directly into the classroom environment. Mandatory attendance of a German Intensive Program in the summer and during the school year for academically strong children and who have a German-speaking environment at home and/or previous knowledge of German. This Intensive-Integration package requires an extra language year consisting of German and math in small group. Sports, art, music, and other activities is together with peers of regular classes to have exposure to the German language.

For children whose first language is not Arabic, lessons in Arabic as a foreign language also begin in the first grade.

GISAD is an all-day school that offers after-school care facilities. The after-school program offers a variety of options, also through cooperation with extra-curricular partners, to relieve parents of after-school supervision and homework assistance.
