= German International School Sharjah =

Coordinates: 25.35126°N 55.42774°E

German International School Sharjah German: Deutsche Internationale Schule Sharjah

Information
- Established: 1976; 49 years ago
- Grades: K-12
- Website: www.dssharjah.org

German International School Sharjah (German: Deutsche Internationale Schule Sharjah, DSS) is a German international school in Sharjah in the UAE, serving kindergarten through grade 12. It was established in 1976.
