= International Community School of Addis Ababa =

International school in Addis Ababa, Ethiopia

- ኢንተርናሽናል ኮምዩኒቲ ትምህርት ቤት

Location
- Mauritania Rd, Addis Ababa, Ethiopia; Bisrate Gabriel, Addis Ababa; 8°59′49.53″N 38°43′38.94″E

Information
- Type: International school
- Colours: Black and white
- Website: www.icsaddis.org

The International Community School of Addis Ababa (ICS Addis; Amharic: ኢንተርናሽናል ኮምዩኒቲ ትምህርት ቤት) is an international school in Addis Ababa, Ethiopia founded in 1964.

The school has around 1,000 students enrolled from 67 nations. ICS Addis has been accredited by the Middle States Association of Colleges and Schools since 1992. The school was accredited again in December 2014. ICS Addis has been authorized to offer the International Baccalaureate Program (IB) since March 1982.

ICS Addis' campus spans 15 acres (61,000 m^{2}). The sports facility of the school includes, among others, a 300-meter track dedicated to Haile Gebrselassie and a sports pavilion. The Early Childhood area is on a separate campus right next to the main campus. The New Classroom Building (NCB), dedicated for the middle school, is equipped with classrooms and laboratories.

ICS Addis Ababa campus

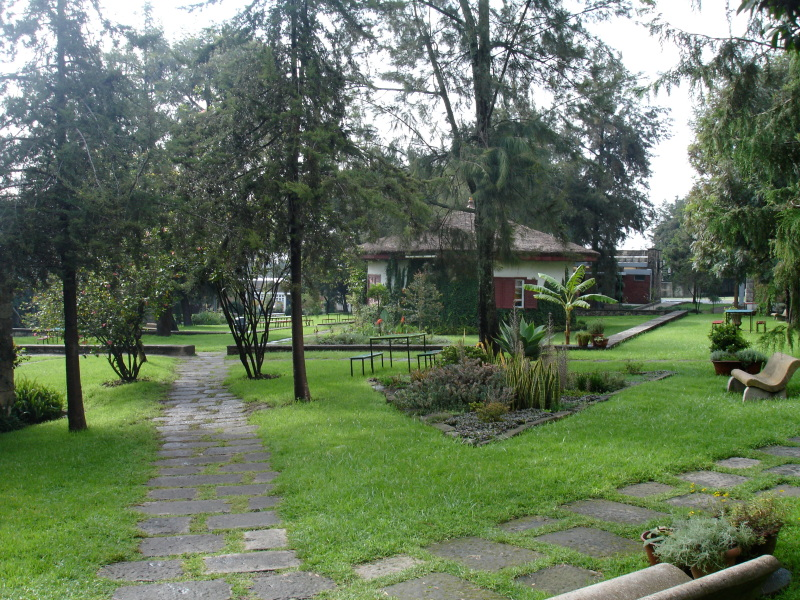
Library Lawn and Tukel

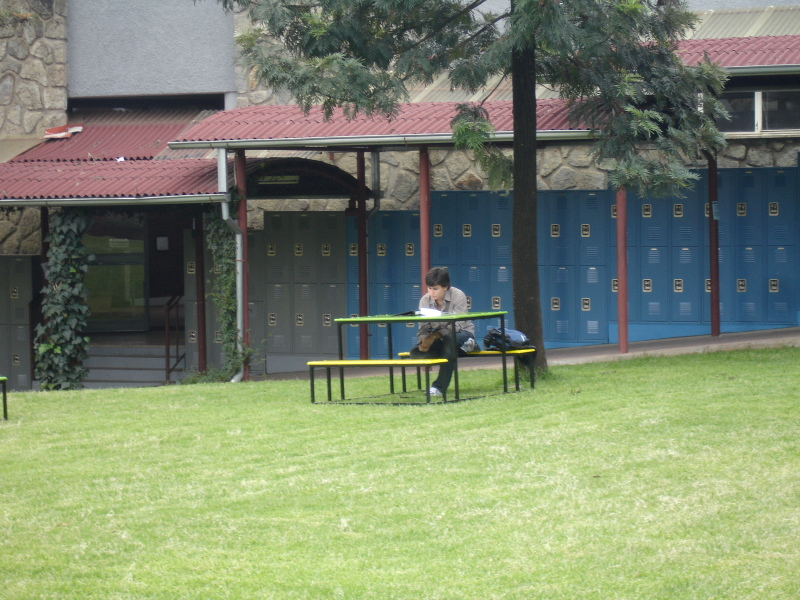
Lockers

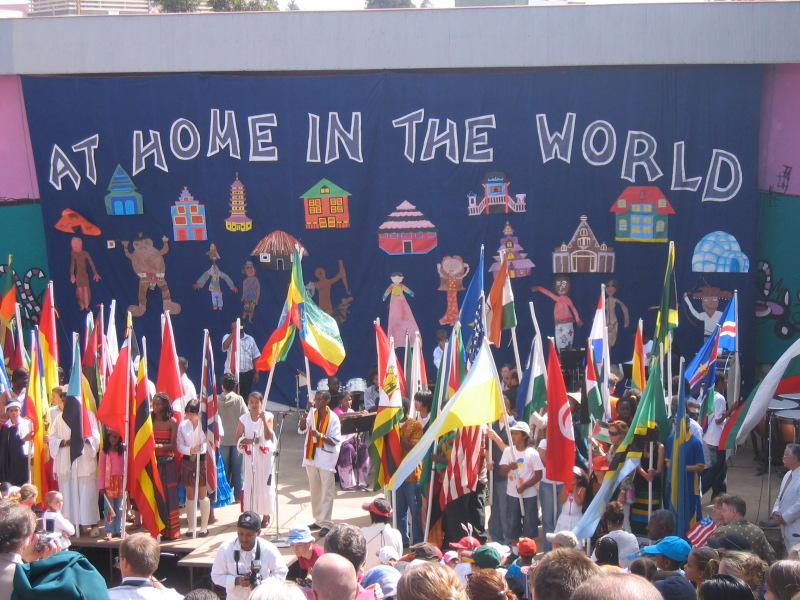
International Day 2007

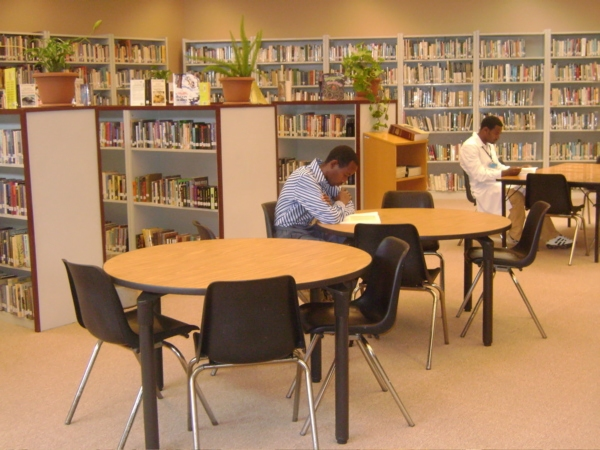
MS/HS Library

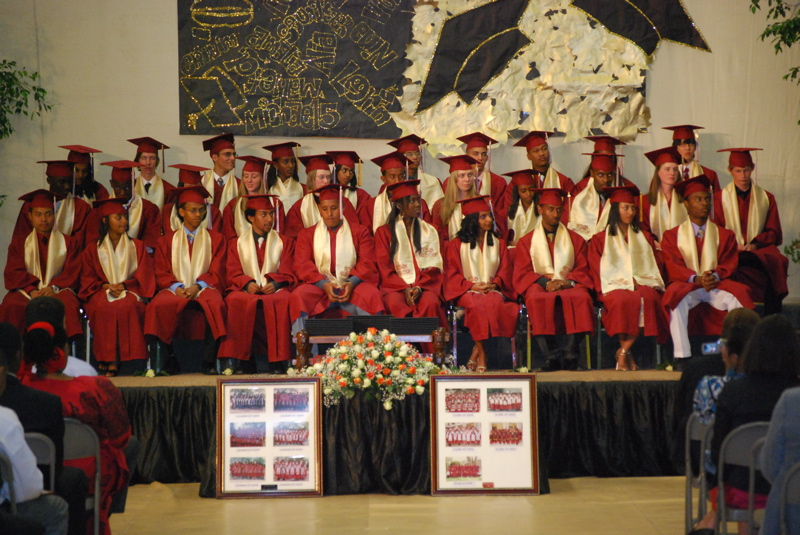
Class of 2009

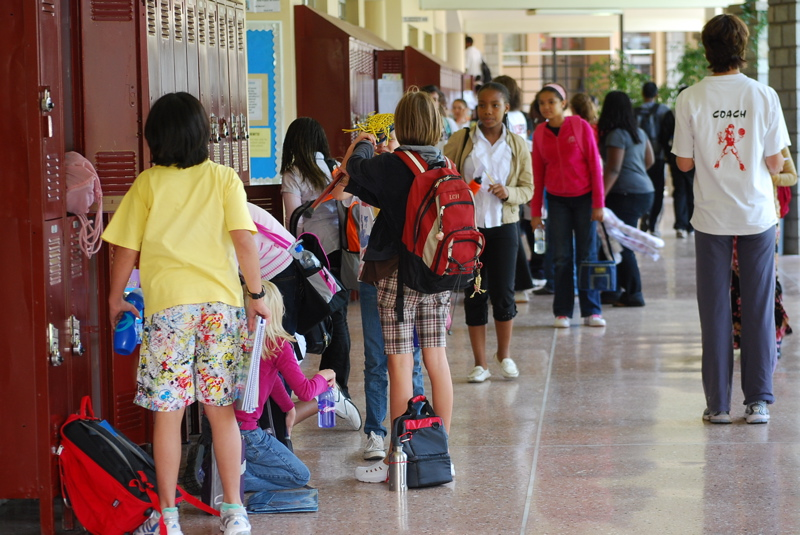
MS locker area

== Programs ==
ICS Addis follows a college-preparatory American curriculum model, and the program is divided into four sections: early childhood (EC3-EC4), elementary (K-5), middle (6-8) and high school (9-12). The school offers an American high school diploma to all graduates who meet graduation requirements. Almost 100% of the graduates enter higher education immediately after graduation, and 85% of the graduates attend colleges and universities in the US and Canada. Many students also pursue the IB Diploma (International Baccalaureate). The school is the only testing center for the SAT in the city, but does not offer the TOEFL.

The after-school program includes sports at all age levels, drama, clubs, activities and community service opportunities. Sports teams at several age levels participate in a local league with other international and national schools. Boys and girls varsity soccer, volleyball and basketball teams also participate in the International Schools of Southern and Eastern Africa (ISSEA) league, with seven other international schools from Mozambique, Kenya, Tanzania, Uganda, Zimbabwe, Zambia and South Africa.

Students of the middle and high school go on four-or-five night grade level field trips to areas of Ethiopia/overseas, in support of the science or history curricula. However, domestic trips have been cancelled for 3 years, as of 2017, with the school administration citing safety concerns.

== Philosophy ==
The school is in a PLC (Professional Learning Community) journey towards becoming certified as a PLC Exemplar School. The collaborative planning in all areas of the education is guided by the four essential PLC questions:

Q1: What is it that we want our kids to know and be able to do?

Q2: How will we know they know it?

Q3: What will we do if they don't know it?

Q4 What will we do if they already know it?

== Admissions ==
Admission is based upon completed application forms, previous school records and results from previous or current academic testing as required by the professional staff.

Placement tests at the time of application assist admissions and placement decisions. ICS does not offer part-time, partial or correspondence programs.

== Scholarship program ==
Since the early 1990s, ICS Addis has offered four 4-year scholarships every year to rising ninth graders from schools throughout Addis Ababa. The scholarships are need-blind and are based on merit.

The selection process begins in March/April with applications from the top students from public and private middle schools around the city. Applicants are taken through a rigorous process that includes a 3-hour written test along with student and parent interviews.

The Scholarship Club hosts an Ethiopian Food Sale once or twice every year. The sale includes the traditional foods of Ethiopia; both fasting and non-fasting. Besides the food sale, the Scholarship Club also hosts a garage sale every year. These are funding programs, created to help the Scholarship Club financially.

Many of the ICS scholarship students go on to win full scholarships at universities in the USA. In the past, ICS Scholarship Students have been awarded four-year scholarships to universities such as Harvard, MIT, Stanford, Vassar, Davidson, Yale, Princeton, Columbia, Duke and Amherst.

== Governance ==
The school is governed by a nine-member Board of Governors. Two members are elected for two-year terms by the ICS Addis Parent Association, six members are appointed by the Board for four-year terms and one member is appointed by the US Ambassador.

== Alumni ==
- The address to the ICS Addis alumni link is https://sites.google.com/icsaddis.edu.et/alumnilink
- Scanned copies of yearbooks from the school's early years are available from Lee Miller at US Mapping Mission.

=== Notable alumni ===
- Prince Joel Dawit Makonnen, lawyer and member of the Ethiopian imperial family
- Rediet Abebe, computer scientist and Junior Fellow at the Harvard Society of Fellows

== See also ==
- List of international schools
- List of schools in Ethiopia
