= Ethio-Parents' School =

Private school in Addis Ababa, Ethiopia

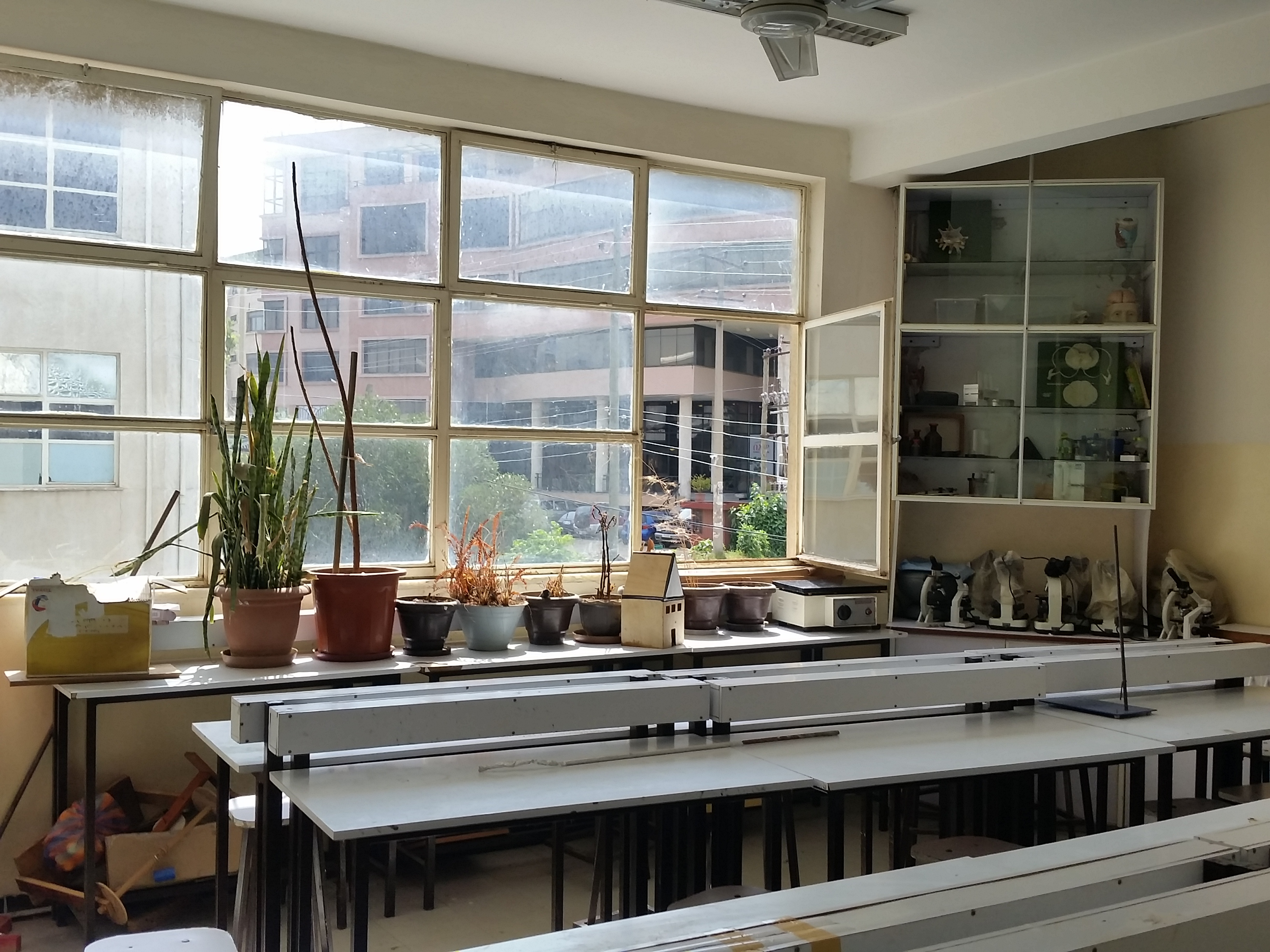
- Plants in a Ethio-Parents' School Biology Laboratory

Location
- Bole, Addis Ababa; Ethiopia; 9.0019°N 38.8071°E

Information
- Type: Private school
- Motto: A Gate to Wisdom
- Established: 1995 (31 years ago)
- Staff: >325
- Gender: Coeducational
- Enrollment: >3000
- Owner: HOHETE TIBEB Share Company (HTSC)
- Website: www.ethioparentsschool.com

Ethio-Parents' School is a private school in Bole zone, Woreda 11 in Addis Ababa, Ethiopia. With enrollment of more than 3,000 students, Ethio-Parents' School has students from grade 1 to 12. It is the first private school in Ethiopia that introduced Information and Communication Technology (ICT) as a basic teaching element. The school is managed by HOHETE TIBEB Share Company (HTSC).

== History ==
Ethio-Parents' School was formed by volunteer parents in 1995. It started with 54 Teachers, 26 Administrative staffs and 300 Students. So far, the school has opened up two branches in Gerji and Gullele. The school has enrolled more than 3000 students from pre-school to college preparatory grades in the two branches. Currently the school has 325 academic staff members. It is run by a group called 'MSN'. and in grade 9 in 2017/18 academic year.
