= Bingham Academy =

International Christian school in Addis Ababa, Ethiopia

Coordinates: 9.040997°N 38.715802°E

- Addis Ababa; Ethiopia

Information
- Former name: Home and School for Missionary's Children
- Type: International school
- Religious affiliation: Christianity
- Established: 1946; 80 years ago
- Grades: K-12

Bingham Academy is an international Christian school located in Addis Ababa, Ethiopia.

== History ==
What became Bingham Academy was first established in 1946 as the "Home and School for Missionary's Children" (SMC). In 1952 it moved from its original location in Eas Dairu to its present location in Kolfe. Over the years it has had a various number of different grades, starting with Grade 1 to 8 in 1946 to the current Kindergarten to 12. But it has changed Kindergarten by cutting them into 2 rooms for Kg1 and Kg2

It was rated amongst the top 100 secondary schools by Africa Alamanac in 2003.

== Information ==
Director: Kent Austell
Secondary Principal: Alyssa Harrison
Elementary Principal: Esther Marseveen
Grades: Kindergarten 1 - 12
Students: Around 330
Staff: Around 40 full-time teachers.
Curriculum: Cambridge International
Area: 8 acres (32,000 m^{2})
