= Lycée Guebre-Mariam =

Gebre-Mariam French-Ethiopian High School
- Lycée franco-éthiopien Guébré-Mariam ገብረ ማርያም ትምህርት ቤት
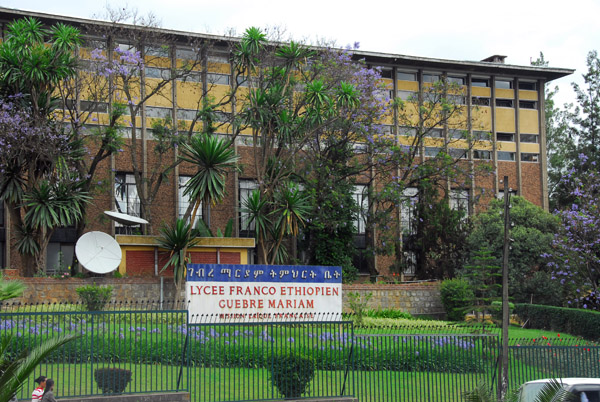

Location
- Churchill Road; Arada-Kebele 01/02; 1496/1220 Addis-Abeba; Ethiopia
- Coordinates: 9.024036°N 38.752382°E

Information
- Type: French International school
- Motto: Two cultures, three languages
- Established: 1947
- Principal: Jean-Christophe Torres
- Grades: Preschool – 12th grade
- Age range: 3–18
- Enrollment: 1,759 (2017/2018)
- Language: French, English, and Amharic
- Affiliation: Mission laïque française (since 1947)
- Information: MLF school under agreement with the AEFE
- Exam preparation: French national diploma, Baccalauréat, national diplomas
- Languages taught: French, Amharic, English, Spanish, Italian (Mandarin and German via distance learning)
- Language certifications: French (DELF), English (Cambridge English)
- Website: guebre-mariam.org

The Gebre-Mariam French-Ethiopian High School, commonly known as Lycée Guébré-Mariam (LGM) (Amharic: ገብረ ማርያም ትምህርት ቤት), is a French international school in Addis Ababa, Ethiopia. It was established in 1947 and in the same year had integrated the Mission laïque française. It covers maternelle (preschool) through terminale, the final year of lycée (senior high school). It includes multilingual education in French, English and Amharic from preschool for all students. As of 2017, the school has about 1,800 students, ranging from 3 to 18 years.

The French government spends around €4 million every year on LGM, which comes out to about €2,500 per student.

== Namesake ==
The school's name commemorates Dejazmach Gebre Mariam Gari, who was an Ethiopian anti-fascist resistance fighter during the Second Italo-Ethiopian War and the subsequent Italian occupation of Ethiopia. His name, Gebre Mariam, translates to “servant of Mary”.

The hyphen in the school's name is due to a French punctuation convention. (See French orthography#Hyphens)

== Notable alumni ==
- Helen Pankhurst
- Liya Kebede
- Ethiopian Records
- Amde Akalework
- Sahle-Work Zewde
- Chef Yohanis
- Betty G.

The LGM has a website dedicated to its alumni, former LGM students.

== See also ==
- Agency for French Education Abroad
- Education in France
- International school
- List of international schools
- Mission laïque française
- Multilingualism
