= Deutsche Schule Bukarest =

German international school in Bucharest, Romania

- Școala Germană București

Location
- Strada Coralilor 20G, Sector 1 Bucharest; Romania; 44.49112°N 26.0588°E

Information
- Type: German international school
- Established: 2007
- School district: Sector 1
- Principal: Martin Nickels
- Faculty: 67 teachers and educators
- Grades: Kindergarten, Grundschule, and Gymnasium
- Age range: 1 year and 10 months to 18 years
- Language: German
- Campus size: more than 2 ha
- Mascot: A fox named Kuki
- Accreditation: from Germany and registration in ARACIP Romania
- Website: www.dsbu.ro

Deutsche Schule Bukarest (DSBU; Romanian: Școala Germană București) is a German international school located at 20G Coralilor Street, Bucharest, Romania, established in 2007.

It includes a nursery school (Kinderkrippe), kindergarten, elementary school (Grundschule), and high school (Gymnasium). It is accredited by the German government's Central Agency for German Schools Abroad, as a Deutsche Schule im Ausland ("German School Abroad"), being one of currently 143 such schools established internationally to promote the German culture and language in other countries.

== Other German-language schools in Buchaest ==
DSBU should not be confused with Bukarest's historical German school, established before 1778, the year of its first documented mention (a school researcher even speaks of proof going back to 1752) and currently called German Goethe College Bucharest, once the confessional school of the German Evangelical community. It has been an important and attractive educational institution for the entire population of the capital city for over a century, reaching 2000 enrolled students and above before WWI and in the 1970s.

There are also two recently established private German-language schools, Zeppelin Schule (est. 2012; www.zeppelinschule.ro), and the Hermann Oberth International German School in Voluntari suburb (est. 2012; www.scoala-germana.ro/en).

== See also ==
- Germans of Romania
- Germany–Romania relations
