= German International School New York =

Private school in White Plains, New York, United States

- Deutsche Internationale Schule New York

Location
- 50 Partridge Road, White Plains, NY 10605; White Plains, New York; United States; 41°00′50″N 73°44′02″W

Information
- Type: Private, College/University Preparatory
- Motto: Tua res agitur It concerns you
- Established: 1980
- Founder: Siegfried A. Kessler
- Head of School: Volker Ovelgönne
- Grades: Pre-K through 12
- Colors: Blue, Orange and White
- Accreditation: Permanent Conference of the Department of Education of the Federal Republic of Germany, New York State Association of Independent Schools (NYSAIS)
- Website: www.gisny.org

German International School New York (also known as Deutsche Internationale Schule New York, or 'GISNY' for short) is a private, bilingual (German/English) college preparatory school that enrolls over 400 students in grades Pre-K through 12. The School is located in White Plains, New York, approximately 25 miles north of New York City, and is divided into three schools on the same campus: the Lower School, the Middle School and the Upper School.

Many GISNY students are citizens of German-speaking countries. Increasingly, however, the school enrolls a diverse community that includes families from all over the world. Today, over 50% of GISNY students are US citizens or reside in the US permanently.

GISNY is accredited by the New York State Association of Independent Schools (NYSAIS), the Kultusministerkonferenz (Conference of Ministers of Education of Germany) and is a New York non-public Elementary and Secondary School. GISNY is a partner school of the German initiative "Schulen: Partner der Zukunft" and was awarded the title of "excellent foreign school" by the German Bundesverwaltungsamt (BVA) in August 2009 and again in November 2014.

== History ==
=== Founding ===
German International School New York was founded by Siegfried A. Kessler in response to the need to provide educational continuity for the children of German-speaking executives based in the Tri-State area of New York, Connecticut and New Jersey. German-speaking parents feared that, by taking foreign assignments, their children would be inadequately prepared and might even fail examinations upon their return to Europe. In 1978, Mr. Kessler, former president of Carl Zeiss AG, founded a non-profit organization called the "German Forum". The organization's prime goal was to found a school offering German-speaking children an education that would be recognized in their home countries. Kessler's hope was that the institution would be "one that would contribute to improving relations between nations."

The school officially opened on September 8, 1980. On September 23, 1980, Germany's Vice-Chancellor and Minister of Foreign Affairs, Hans Dietrich Genscher, led the dedication ceremony. Speaking as the designated representative of the Federal Republic of Germany, he affirmed that the school would primarily provide German-speaking children with an education that would be recognized in their home countries. He also emphasized, however, that the school should not isolate itself, but should integrate into its surroundings and incorporate its American context into its own activities and perspectives. This way, the school would become a bridge and meeting point between Germans and Americans.

=== Expansion and enhancement ===
Beginning with the purchase of its existing school building in White Plains, NY in 1982, GISNY has undergone several changes. To accommodate more students of different age groups, an Upper School was added to the Lower School. The first high school graduation took place on May 15, 1989. By the school's 30th anniversary in 2010, the student body had increased to 350 with a faculty of over 40 teachers.

The period between 1997 and 2001 saw the largest of many improvements to the school's facilities with the construction of a state-of-the-art gym complete with a professional rock-climbing wall. In September 2010, the school completed the installment of solar panels on the gym's roof as part of an ongoing effort to reduce its ecological footprint. Today, the solar panels generate, on average, 20% of the school's electricity.

There have also been changes to the school's educational program, including the introduction of the twelve-year curriculum, the German International Abitur (Deutsches Internationales Abitur - DIA) (the class of 2017 will be the first to receive this diploma), and more recently a Pre-Kindergarten program for three- and four-year-olds (September 2014).

At the Annual Meeting of Members in November 2013, the Corporation approved a proposal to change the name of the school from German School New York to German International School New York, or GISNY for short. The name change became official on September 2, 2014, at a ceremony attended by White Plains Mayor Thomas Roach and German Consul General Brita Wagener.

== Academics ==
=== Lower School ===
In first through fourth grades, students learn to read fluently and to express themselves clearly in both written and spoken German and English. To establish a solid foundation for the academic rigors of the International Abitur curriculum in the Middle and Upper Schools, most subjects are taught in German. However, all students receive daily individualized English instruction taught by native English-speaking teachers. For students for whom German is not their first language, the school provides German as a Second Language (GSL) support during the school day as well as an optional after-school class.

=== Middle and Upper Schools ===
As GISNY students transition from the Lower School to the Middle and Upper Schools, they are welcomed into a new world of challenging academic instruction.

In addition to languages, students receive intensive instruction in math, sciences (physics, chemistry, biology), history and social studies (both European and American), economics, geography, art and music. The rigorous International Abitur curriculum, recognized globally for its depth and breadth – for example, GISNY students begin studying biology in 5th grade, physics in 7th grade and chemistry in 8th grade – prepares students for the world's most selective colleges and universities.

Languages

In our Middle and Upper Schools, students take English every year. The English Department offers differentiated instruction based on a student's level of English fluency. Students in Advanced English (native speakers and those who wish to attend a US university) and those taking English elective courses receive instruction from veteran native English-speaking teachers. For students who are less familiar with English, GISNY also offers English as a Second Language (ESL).

In addition to German and English, students add either French or Spanish beginning in 6th grade, and as of 10th grade may choose to add the other language in lieu of physics. Additionally, Latin is offered as an elective course beginning in 7th grade.

The Bilingual Curriculum

Beginning in 5th grade, geography, biology and physical education are taught in both German and English. Music theory and visual arts courses are taught increasingly in English from 5th through 9th grades and exclusively in English from 10th grade on. Also taught in English are American History, which begins in 8th grade, and economics, which begins in 10th grade.

The German International Abitur (Deutsches Internationales Abitur - DIA)

GISNY confers upon its graduates both the New York State high school diploma and the German International Abitur, known in German as the Deutsche Internationale Abitur, or DIA. The DIA grants students the possibility of attending competitive colleges and universities through the United States, Canada, Great Britain and Europe, providing them with truly global options. The program leading to the International Abitur at GISNY includes the following subjects:

- German language and literature
- English language and literature
- European history
- American studies/Politics
- French language and literature
- Spanish language and literature
- Latin [optional]
- Mathematics
- Biology
- Chemistry
- Physics
- Music theory and history
- Art studio and history
- Physical Education

== School Traditions and Clubs ==
Students, faculty and parents take part in several events throughout the school year, such as the participation in the German-American Steuben Parade along Fifth Avenue, Manhattan, as well as the annual Weihnachtsbasar (holiday event) and sporting events. The GISNY literary week also takes place every year, welcoming prominent German and/or American authors and writers to the school.

The GISNY is partnered with the Westchester Holocaust and Human Rights Education Center, allowing students to participate in political events and debates with surrounding schools. In addition, the school shares ties with the Alexander von Humboldt German International School of Montréal, Canada, the German School Washington, D.C., and the Colegio Humboldt in San José, Costa Rica, allowing numerous programs between schools.

GISNY students are encouraged to participate in school clubs, such as the German School Literary Magazine, Yearbook Club, Human Rights and Environment Club, Biology Club, Model United Nations, Mock Trial, Theater Club, School Choir, Glee Club, School Band, School Orchestra and the Home Economics Club.

Students may also choose to additionally take part in various athletics such as Soccer, Basketball, Volleyball, Track and Field, Cross Country, Badminton and Tennis.

== German Language School at GISNY ==
For over 20 years, GISNY has been home to the German Language School (German: Deutsche Sprachschule), giving students outside the GISNY the opportunity to learn and practice their German language skills in a cultural and international environment. The German Language School offers a number of exams including:

- SOPA: Student Oral Proficiency Assessment
- National German Language Exam
- Comprehensive New York State German Regents Exam
- SAT II – German
- Advanced Placement (AP) Exam – German
- Deutsches Sprachdiplom der KMK – Niveaustufen: A2, A2/B1 + B2/C1

== See also ==
- Bonn International School, an Anglo-American school in Bonn formed by the merger of two American schools and one British school
- German American
