= German Embassy School Addis Ababa =

German international school in Addis Ababa, Ethiopia

- Deutsche Botschaftsschule Addis Abeba

Location
- Coordinates: 9.0272°N 38.7794°E

Information
- Website: dbsaa.de

The German Embassy School Addis Ababa (German: Deutsche Botschaftsschule Addis Abeba; DBSAA) is a German international school in Addis Ababa, Ethiopia. The school operates from kindergarten, until Grade 10, as well as the BIB International Baccalaureate programme.

DBSAA is supported by German government. In 1965 it had 22 teachers and 221 learners.
