= List of hospitals in Ethiopia =

Map of Ethiopian regions and Chartered Cities

This list of hospitals in Ethiopia lists the notable hospitals in Ethiopia. The list is organized by region and city. The first Ethiopian hospital was established in 1897. As of 1988, there were 87 hospitals in Ethiopia with 11,296 beds. Medical care in Ethiopia, a nation of more than 100 million people, is provided by numerous clinics in the countryside, and hospitals located mostly in larger towns. There are about 144 regional hospitals placed in the major cities and towns. Out of the total 144 hospitals, about 90 of them are public. The rest, about 54 hospitals, are run by private investors and non-profit organizations.

== Addis Ababa ==
As of 2014, the capital of Ethiopia, Addis Ababa, had more than 52 hospitals, 12 of them state run, and more than 40 private. The following hospitals are in Addis Ababa, a chartered city in the Regional State of Oromia.

- Addis Ababa Fistula Hospital, 9°01′30″N 38°45′16″E
- Addis General Hospital, 9°01′59″N 38°43′58″E
- Addis Hiwot General Hospital, 9°00′47″N 38°47′00″E
- ALERT General Hospital,9°01′22″N 38°44′48″E
- Amanuel Mental Specialized Hospital, 9°01′45″N 38°43′22″E (Note: Amanuel Mental Hospital was built by the Italians in the 1940s. It is the only psychiatric hospital in Ethiopia)
- Amin General Hospital. 9°01′02″N 38°43′44″E
- Anania Mothers and Children Specialized Medical Center, 9°02′28″N 38°44′52″E
- Armed Forces Comprehensive Specialized Hospital (formerly the Princess Tsehai Memorial Hospital), 9°00′45″N 38°43′28″E
- Bella Military Referral Hospital (formerly the Bella Haileselasse Hospital), 9°02′50″N 38°46′58″E
- Betsegah Mother and Child Health Hospital, 9°00′29″N 38°46′37″E
- Betezata General Hospital
- Bethel Teaching General Hospital, 9°2′52″N 38°43′41″E
- Black Lion Comprehensive Specialized Hospital, 9°00′57″N 38°44′33″E
- Brass Mother and Child Health Hospital, 8°59′25″N 38°47′37″E
- Balcha Hospital lideta, 9°00′44″N 38°44′17″E
- Dinberua Maternity Hospital, 9°01′35″N 38°47′12″E

9°02′35″N 38°50′57″E

- Ethio Tebib General Hospital, 9°02′15″N 38°43′15″E
- Federal Police Referral Hospital, 9°00′47″N 38°44′24″E
- Girum General Hospital, 9°02′49″N 38°43′12″E
- Hayat Hospital, 8°59′41″N 38°47′43″E
- Hallelujah General Hospital, 8°59′11″N 38°45′33″E
- International Cardiovascular and Medical Center, 9°01′25″N 38°51′15″E
- Kadisco General Hospital, 8°59′44″N 38°48′51″E
- Lancet General Hospital, 9°01′00″N 38°48′04″E
- Landmark General Hospital, 9°00′22″N 38°44′51″E
- Myungsung Christian Medical Center Comprehensive Specialized Hospital, Bole Medhanealem, 8°59′59″N 38°48′28″E
- Menelik II Referral Hospital, 9.038484531872488°N 38.774286366741364°E
- Nordic Medical Center, 8°59′05″N 38°46′41″E
- Novocare American Clinic, 9°00′10″N 38°47′12″E
- Ras Desta Damtew Hospital, 8°58′51″N 38°45′28″E
- Saint Gabriel General Hospital, 8°59′00″N 38°45′28″E
- Shedeho Internal Medicine Clinic, 8°57′44″N 38°46′16″E
- St. Paul's Comprehensive Specialized Hospital, 9°03′01″N 38°43′39″E
- St. Peter Referral Hospital, 9°04′41″N 38°45′29″E
- St. Yared General Hospital, 9°01′10″N 38°48′36″E
- Tibebu Hospital, 8°59′02″N 38°45′26″E
- Tirunesh Beijing General Hospital, 8°52′40″N 38°47′23″E
- Tzna General Hospital, 8°59′57″N 38°42′55″E
- Yekatit 12 Hospital, 9.04376°N 38.76003°E
- Yerer Hospital, 8°59′32″N 38°49′44″E
- Zenbaba General Hospital, 8°57′20″N 38°45′54″E
- Zewditu Hospital (state run)9°01′12″N 38°45′21″E

== Afar Region ==
The following hospitals are in the Afar Region:

- Abala Hospital, 13°22′09″N 39°45′29″E
- Asaita District Hospital, 11°42′21″N 41°24′54″E
- Dalifage Primary Hospital, 10°31′03″N 40°13′46″E
- Dubti General Hospital, 11°47′25″N 41°04′55″E
- Kelewan General Hospital, 12°15′24″N 39°58′54″E
- Logiya Health Center. 11°43′53″N 40°58′57″E
- Mohammed Aklie Memorial Hospital, 11°45′26″N 40°57′32″E

== Amhara Region ==
The following notable hospitals are generally in the Amhara Region:

- University of Gondar Comprehensive Specialized Hospital, Gondar 12°36′53″N 37°27′07″E
- Debre Birhan Comprehensive Specialized Hospital, Debre Birhan, 9°40′45″N 39°32′07″E
- Debre Markos Comprehensive Specialized Hospital, Debre Markos, 10°19′27″N 37°43′32″E
- Debretabor Comprehensive Specialized Hospital, Debre Tabor
- Fitchie Comprehensive Specialized Hospital, Fiche, 9°47′04″N 38°43′53″E

=== Dessie ===
The following hospitals are in Dessie, Amhara Region:

- Bati General Hospital, 11°08′07″N 39°37′56″E
- Boru Meda Hospital
- Dessie Comprehensive Specialized Hospital, Dessie
- Ethio Hospital
- Selam General Hospital, 11°07′44″N 39°38′02″E

=== Gondar ===
The following hospitals are in Gondar, Amhara Region

- Ibex Hospital, 12°35′54″N 37°27′01″E
- University of Gondar Hospital, 12°36′53″N 37°27′07″E

== Benishangul-Gumuz Region ==
In 2007, there were only two hospitals run by the Ministry of Public Health and private entities in the Benishangul-Gumuz Region.

== Central Ethiopia Regional State ==
The following hospitals are in Central Ethiopia Regional State:

- Worabe Comprehensive Specialized Hospital in Worabe
- Butajira General Hospital in Butajira
- Dr. Bogalech Gebre Memorial Hospital in Durame
- Kulito General Hospital in Halaba Kulito
- Besheno Primary Hospital in Besheno
- Shinshich Primary Hospital in Shinshicho
- Angacha Primary Hospital in Angacha
- Doyogena primary Hospital in Doyogena
- Mudula Primary Hospital in Mudula

== Dire Dawa ==
In 2007, there were only four hospitals in Dire Dawa run by the Ministry of Public Health and private entities in the Dire Dawa chartered city.

== Gambela Region ==
In 2007, there was only one hospital run by the Ministry of Public Health and private entities in the Gambela Region.

== Harari Region ==
The following hospitals are in Harar, Harari Region:

- Selam Multi-specialty Center
- Harar General Hospital, 9°18′46″N 42°06′58″E
- Haramaya University Hiwot Fana Comprehensive Specialized Hospital, 9°18′20″N 42°07′45″E

== OROMIYAA ==
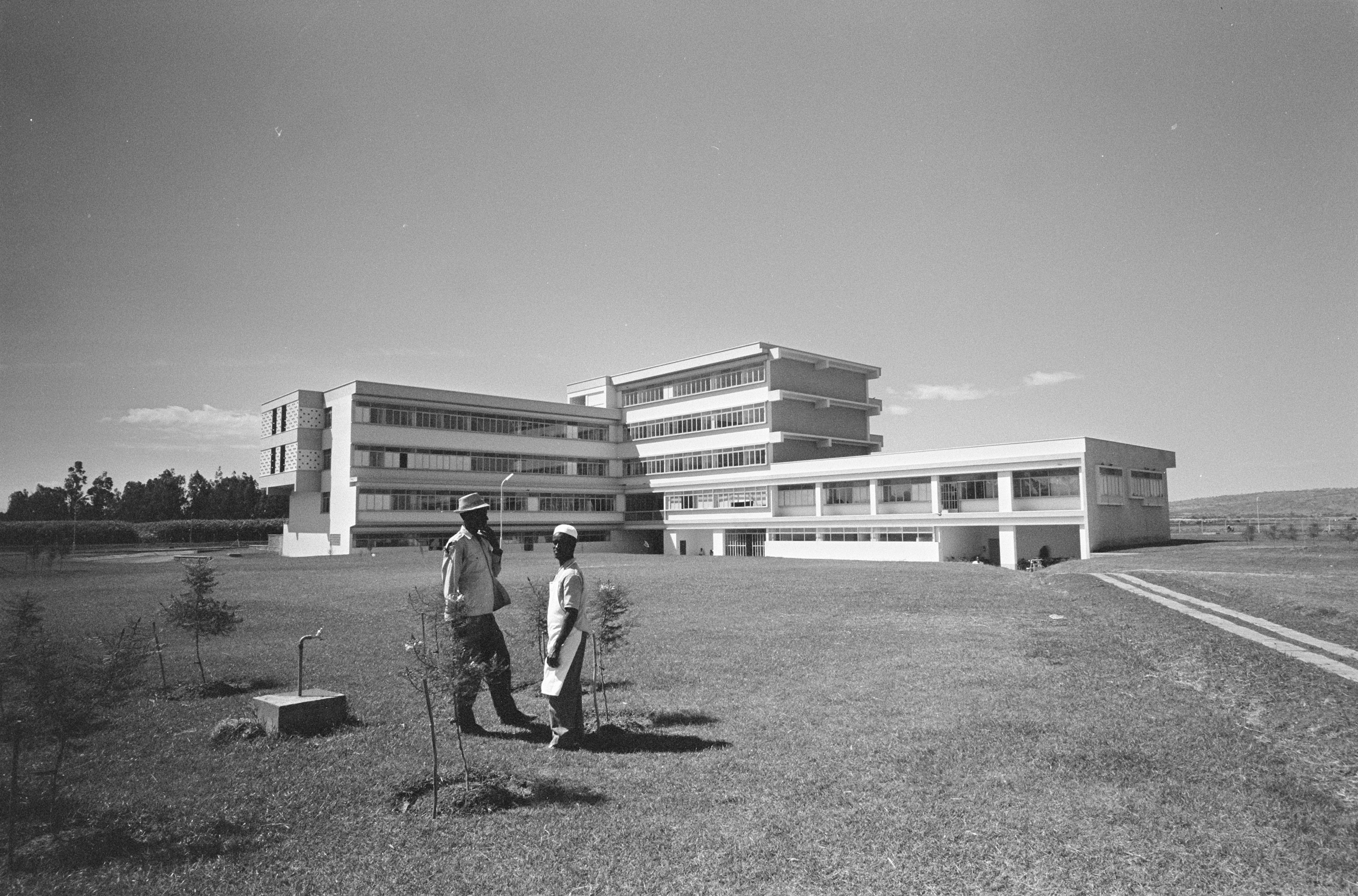
Wonji Hospital in Wenji Gefersa

The following hospitals are in Adama, Oromia Regional State:

- Adama General Hospital & Medical College, 8°33′41″N 39°16′59″E
- Adama Referral Hospital, 8°33′03″N 39°16′32″E
- Rift Valley Hospital & Medical College, 8°32′33″N 39°16′13″E
- Sister Aklesia Memorial Hospital (private), 8°32′37″N 39°16′09″E
- Wonji Hospital, Wenji Gefersa, 8°26′48″N 39°14′10″E

== Sidama Region ==
The following hospitals are in Hawassa, Sidama Region:

- Adare Hospital, 7°03′08″N 38°28′23″E
- Alatyon General Hospital, Toll free Contact Center by 8086 7°01′59″N 38°29′43″E
- Asher Primary Hospital, 7°02′42″N 38°28′40″E
- Bete Abrham Primary Hospital
- Hawassa University Referral Hospital, 7°02′52″N 38°28′16″E
- Kibru Primary Hospital, 7°02′54″N 38°28′34″E
- Masresha Lema
- South Command Military Hospital, 7°04′30″N 38°28′46″E
- Yanet Internal Medicine Specialized Center, 7°09′10″N 38°28′10″E
- Yanet Trauma and Surgery Specialized Center, 7°01′59″N 38°28′31″E
- Abem Primary Hospital

== Somali Region ==
The following hospitals are in the Somali Region:

- Dagahbour General Hospital, Degehabur woreda
- Filtu General Hospital, Filtu, 5°07′14″N 40°39′46″E
- Gode General Hospital, Gode
- Hargelle General Hospital, Hargelle
- Jigjiga Suldan Shiek hassan Yabare University Referral Hospital, Jigjiga, 9°21′22″N 42°47′09″E
- Karamara General Hospital, Jijiga, 9°21′34″N 42°48′03″E
- Qabri Dahare General Hospital, Kebri Dahar
- Sitti General Hospital, Bike
- Warder General Hospital, Werder

== South Ethiopia Regional State ==
The following hospitals are in the South Ethiopia Regional State:

- Soddo Christian Hospital, in Wolaita Sodo6°51′16″N 37°45′38″E
- Wolaita Sodo University Teaching Referral Hospital, 6°51′37″N 37°46′46″E
- Enyat Hospital, Wolaita Sodo
- Grace Hospital, Wolaita Sodo
- St Mary's Hospital, Dubbo, 7°07′33″N 37°41′16″E
- Arba Minch General Hospital (state run)6°01′42″N 37°33′08″E
- Jinka General Hospital, 5°47′00″N 36°34′00″E

== Southwest Ethiopia Regional State ==
The following hospitals are in the Southwest Ethiopia Regional State:

- Gebretsadik Shawo General Hospital in Bonga
- Mizan Aman General Hospital in Mizan
- Tercha General Hospital 7.147471653 37.16644464
- Gesa Primary Hosptial 7.014101429 37.27223707
- Tocha Primary Hospital 7.092088605 37.03971361
- Mizan Tepi University Hospital 6.952973631 35.54999138
- Siz Primary Hospital 6.951422147 35.78238106
- Bachuma Primary Hospital 6.81786318 35.90131867
- Maji Primary Hospital 6.174561164 35.58897743

== Tigray Region ==
The following hospitals are in the Tigray Region:

- Abiy Addi District Hospital, Abiy Addi
- Adigrat General Hospital, Adigrat
- Adwa District Hospital, Adwa woreda
- Axum Referral Hospital, Axum
- Axum University Referral Hospital, Axum
- Alamata District Hospital, Alamata
- Ayder Hospital
- Lemelem Karl Zonal Hospital
- Mekelle General Hospital, Mekelle
- Quiha District Hospital
- St. Mary's Hospital, Axum
- Sihul General Hospital
- Wukro District Hospital, Wukro

During the Tigray War, most of the healthcare facilities in the region had been looted, vandalised, or destroyed. Many hospitals had been occupied by military forces as their base and to tend to their injured soldiers.

== See also ==
- Healthcare in Ethiopia
- Regions of Ethiopia

== Notes ==
General references

- "Summary of Ethiopian Healthcare". Columbia University. 25 August 2020.
- "A Manual of Ethiopian Medical History" (PDF). People to People. 2012. Archived from the original (PDF) on January 2, 2022.
