= Beyene Haile =

Eritrean writer (1941–2012)

- Born: 1941
- Died: 2012 (aged 70–71); Asmara
- Occupations: Writer, public administrator, novelist, playwright, painter

Beyene Haile (Tigrinya: በየነ ሃይለ ; 1941 – 29 June 2012) was a writer, painter and an organizational and management specialist who founded and directed the Eritrean Center for Organizational Excellence (ERCOE) till he died on 29 June 2012. He is regarded as one of the most important figures in modern Eritrean literature and in the development of organizational training and leadership education in post-independence Eritrea.

== Early life ==
Beyene Haile was born in Asmara in 1941. Beyene began his primary education at Agazi School in Adigrat. He later pursued his secondary education at Teferi Mekonnen School in Addis Ababa. After completing high school, he returned to Asmara and wrote his first book, Abidu Do Tibluwo, at the age of 18. Although written early, the book was published when he was 23.

One year after completing his first novel, Beyene was awarded a scholarship to study at the American University of Beirut, where he earned a double major in Political Science and Public Administration.

== Professional career ==
Upon returning from Beirut, Beyene began his professional career in public administration and organizational development. He served as Director of Personnel at the Eritrean Public Health Service in Asmara, Director of Zewditu Hospital in Addis Ababa, Organizational Researcher at the Ethiopian Ministry of Health, Principal Training Consultant at the Ethiopian Management Institute (EMI).

Following Eritrea's independence, Beyene returned permanently to his home country, where he focused on national capacity-building efforts. He conducted extensive research on Eritrean institutions and developed training programs centred on organizational excellence, leadership, and institutional effectiveness.

These efforts culminated in the founding of the Eritrean Center for Organizational Excellence (ERCOE) in 2006 by Beyene Haile, which he directed until his death in 2012. Conceived on the principle that management is a dynamic process, ERCOE played a sustained role in strengthening the organizational capacity of Eritrean government and public institutions. The center provided strategic planning, management reform, and leadership training to nine ministries, construction companies across all six regions, public enterprises under the Ministry of Transport and Communications, the Saving and Micro-Credit Program, the Eritrean Police, colleges and the Ministry of Defense. Since its establishment, ERCOE has significantly contributed to the development of the organizational capacity of government and public institutions in Eritrea.

== Literary and artistic work ==
Alongside his professional work in training and education, Beyene remained deeply committed to literature and the arts. He authored essays and articles and published several major literary works, including:

- Abidu Do Tibluwo ("Madness", 1965), his first book
- Dukan Tibereh ("Tibereh’s Shop", 2003).
- Heart to Heart Talk, a three-act play staged in Asmara and well received by critics
- Tisbit Bahgu ("The Ambitions of Bahgu", 2006)
- Mezghebe: Would You Say He Was Mad?, a modernist novel often described as "art for its own sake," marked a turning point in the development of the Tigrinya novel and has been noted for its stylistic and syntactic complexity, with affinities to James Joyce's A Portrait of the Artist as a Young Man.

In addition to his literary output, Beyene was also active as a painter.

== Influence and legacy ==
Beyond his own literary and educational output, Beyene Haile exerted a lasting influence on several generations of Eritrean writers, artists, and students. Contemporary figures such as Yohannes Fitwi and Michael Eyasu have explicitly acknowledged Beyene's role in shaping their intellectual and artistic development. Numerous testimonies and cultural commentaries further point to the broad admiration his work enjoys among Eritreans.
