= Emergency medical services in Ethiopia =

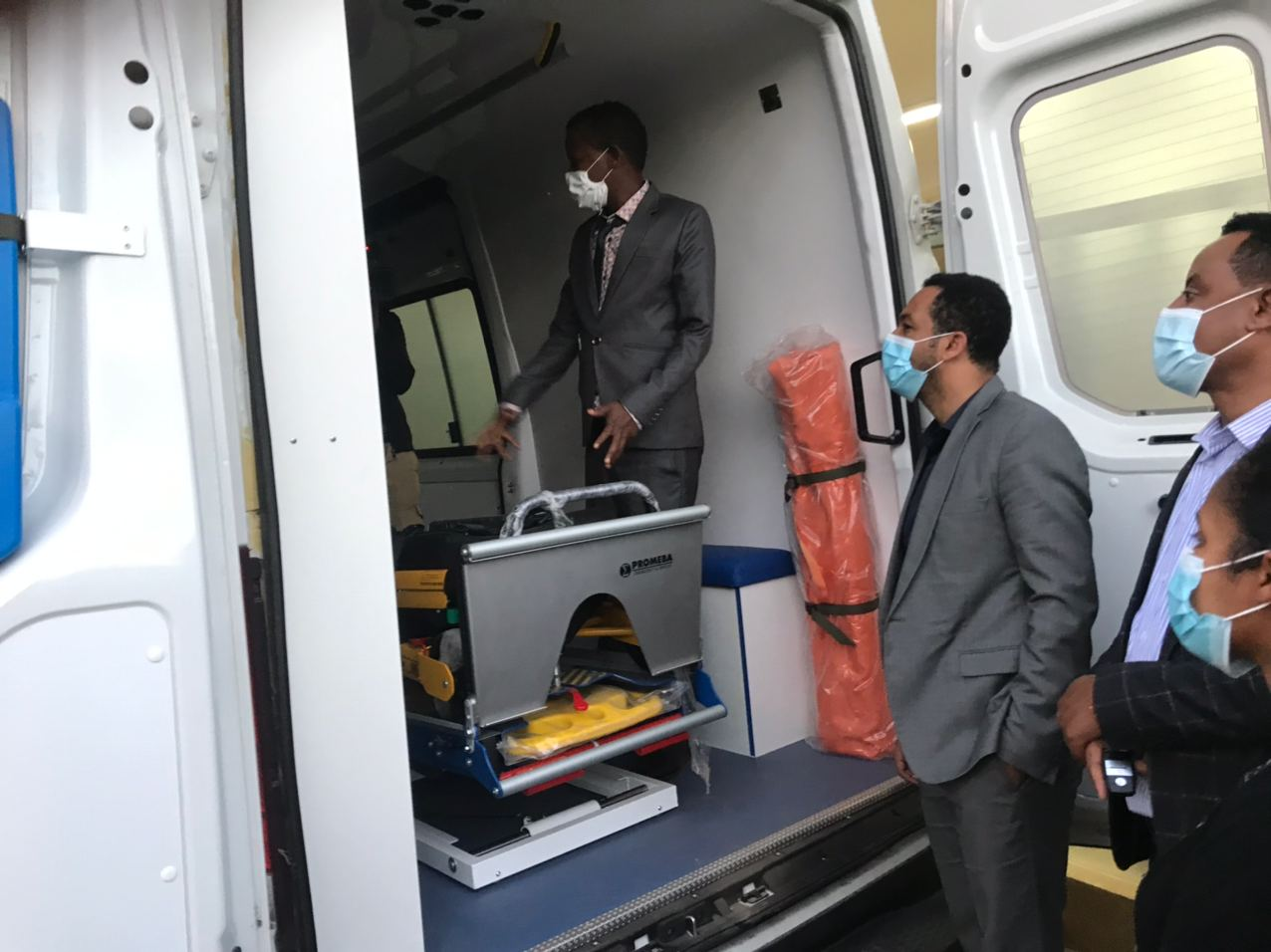
State Minister of Health Dereje Dhuguma visiting an advanced ambulance unit owned by Aayyoo Ambulance Dispatch Center in Jimma city

Despite the success of healthcare system implementing emergency medical services in recent years, Ethiopia endures major obstacles in provision due to shortages of emergency equipment and equity across all regional states.

== Background ==
Ethiopia's healthcare emergency medical services general lacks significant improvements and suffers shortages in equity among all regional states. In 2008, the first ambulance and emergency service provider called Tebita was established by specialist Kibret Abebe. In Addis Ababa, emergency medical services has been challenged as patients being transported through taxi and private automobile. Ambulance delaying and language barrier also contributed to these challenges, aggravating suffering of patients.

According to the World Health Organization (WHO), patients who died from trauma is as a result of emergency-related issues. In 2023, a cross-sectional study was conducted among 422 clients who receiving emergency services in public hospitals in Hawassa. The study concluded that about 24.9% (one quarter) participants used emergency medical services. The Addis Ababa Fire and Disaster Risk Management Commission (AAFDRMC) offers pre-hospital emergency services such as out of hospital services and transportation, which is operated under government fund. In recent years, Ethiopia's healthcare system has improved its emergency medical service with convenient policy; including urgent ambulance accessibility, limiting bed space and offering first aid paramedic services.

During COVID-19 pandemic, pre-hospital EMS utilization was reportedly reached from 0% to 38%, while the level of prehospital care utilization was 87.6%.
