= Healthcare in Ethiopia =

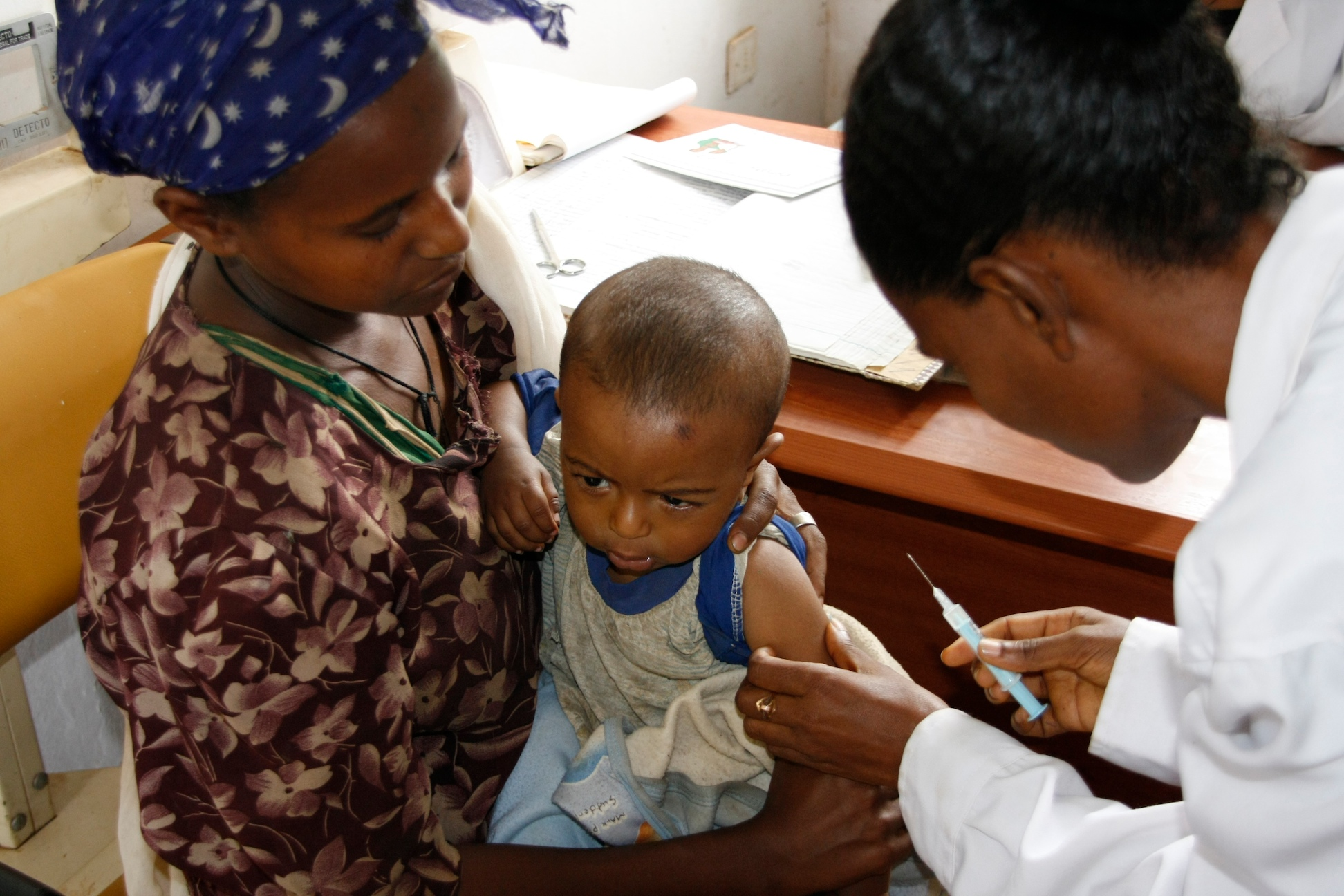
A child receiving measles vaccination in Ethiopia

Ethiopia's healthcare system faces increasing demand driven by population growth, urbanization, and a shifting disease burden toward non-communicable conditions.

The government of Ethiopia has implemented a community-based health insurance model as part of its strategy to achieve universal health care, where households can pay into the official health insurance fund of their woreda (district) and draw upon it when in need of medical care. As of 2025, the Community-Based Health Insurance (CBHI) program covers approximately 80% of Ethiopian citizens, having expanded from 13 districts in 2011 to over 1,100 districts nationwide.

== Overview ==
Ethiopia has an estimated population of over 120 million people, making it the second-most populous country in Africa after Nigeria. The country faces a high burden of communicable diseases, including HIV, malaria, and tuberculosis, as well as maternal and child health conditions such as diarrhea, dehydration, pneumonia, and neonatal disorders. Malnutrition remains prevalent. These conditions account for the majority of morbidity and mortality.Non-communicable diseases, including cardiovascular conditions, cancers, and mental illness, as well as injuries, are emerging as major health concerns in Ethiopia.

== Statistics ==
Life expectancy in Ethiopia

Total population (2020)	117 190 911
Gross domestic product per capita (US$, 2019)	826
Life expectancy at birth (2019)	68.7
Infant mortality rate (per 1000 live births, 2020)	35.40
Under-five mortality rate (per 1 000 live births, 2020)	48.75
Probability of dying between 15 and 60 years m/f (per 1 000 population, 2016)	246/194
Total expenditure on health per capita (Intl $, 2014)	73
Total expenditure on health as % of GDP (2019)	3

== Health care financing ==
The current health care financing strategy of Ethiopia focuses on financing of primary health care services in a sustainable manner. It envisions reaching universal health coverage by 2035. The prioritized initiatives are mobilizing adequate resources mainly from domestic sources, reducing out-of-pocket spending at the point of service use, enhancing efficiency and effectiveness, strengthening public private partnership and capacity development for improved health care financing. To operationalize the strategy, various reform measures were implemented. These reforms include: revenue retention and use at the health facility level; systematizing fee waiver system; standardization of exempted services; setting and revision of user fees; allowing establishment of private wing in public hospitals; outsourcing of non-clinical services; and, promotion of health facility autonomy through establishment of a governance body; and establishment of health insurance system.

According to the 6th National Health Accounts (2013/14), health service in Ethiopia is primarily financed from four sources: the federal and regional governments; grants and loans from bilateral and multilateral donors; non-governmental organizations and private contributions. The total health expenditure per capita has increased from $4.5 per capita in 1995/1966 to 20.77 in 2010/11 and $28.65 per capita in 2013/14.The share of total health expenditure coming from domestic sources has increased from 50 percent in 2010/11 to 64 percent in 2013/14.

=== Purchasing of services ===
While mobilizing sufficient public resources and organizing pooling to maximize re-distributive capacity are essential for achieving equitable and affordable health care access for all, it is of equal importance that collected resources be efficiently used in order to maximize and sustain the provision of benefits for the population. Strategic use of the purchasing function is the key health financing instrument for this purpose. The main purchasers of health service in Ethiopia are: the Ministry of Health; Regional Health Bureaus; District/Woreda Health Offices in the form of line-item budgets; Ethiopia Health Insurance Agency; and, other government entities that transfer budget to service providers to reimburse service delivery cost; and households in the form of user fee. There is fee waiver system to covers Indigents but with various challenges in implementation. Two million people are presently are covered by this.

== History ==
In Ethiopia, the quest for modern medicine beyond traditional practice started during Emperor Lebna Dengel’s reign in the 15th century, when the emperor appealed to the Portuguese king for physicians and surgeons to cure illnesses. Later in 1866, western medicine was introduced by Swedish missionary doctors and nurses. The first Ethiopian hospital was established in 1897, the Ministry of Health in 1948 and the first medical school in the country opened in 1964. It was only during Emperor Menelik’s time (1889-1913) that the first foreign-trained Ethiopian medical doctor, Hakim Workneh Eshete, began practicing medicine in Addis Ababa.

Throughout the 1990s, the government, as part of its reconstruction program, devoted ever-increasing amounts of funding to the social and health sectors, which brought corresponding improvements in school enrolments, adult literacy, and infant mortality rates. These expenditures stagnated or declined during the 1998–2000 war with Eritrea, but since outlays for health have grown steadily. In 2000–2001, the budget allocation for the health sector was approximately US$144 million; health expenditures per capita were estimated at US$4.50, compared with US$10 on average in sub-Saharan Africa. In 2000 the country counted one hospital bed per 4,900 population and more than 27,000 people per primary health care facility. The physician to population ratio was 1:48,000, the nurse to population ratio, 1:12,000. Overall, there were 20 trained health providers per 100,000 inhabitants. Health care is disproportionately available in urban centers; in rural areas where the vast majority of the population resides, access to health care varied from limited to nonexistent.

In 1993 the government published the country's first health policy in 50 years, articulating a vision for the health care sector development. The policy fully reorganized the health services delivery system as contributing positively to the country's overall socioeconomic development efforts. Its major themes focused on:

- Democratization and decentralization of health system;
- Expanding the primary health care system and emphasizing preventive, promotional, and basic curative health services; and
- Encouraging partnerships and the participation of the community and nongovernmental actors.

A Health Sector development Program was developed every five years beginning in 1997/98.

In the early 2000s, under Health Minister Tedros Adhanom Ghebreyesus (later WHO director-general), Ethiopia's healthcare industry improved, including a tripled amount of childhood vaccinations, and maternal deaths dropped from 1,400 per 100,000 live births to 420.

In 2002 the government embarked on a poverty reduction program that called for outlays in education, health, sanitation, and water. A polio vaccination campaign for 14 million children was carried out. In 2003 the government launched the Health Extension Program intended to provide universal primary health care coverage by 2009. This included placing two government-salaried female Health Extension Workers in every kebele, with the aim of shifting the emphasis of health care to prevention. About 2,700 completed their training by the end of 2004 at 11 technical and vocational education centers, while 7,000 were still in training in 2005, and over 30,000 were expected to complete their training by 2009. However, these trainees encountered a lack of adequate facilities, including classrooms, libraries, water, and latrines. The selection of trainees was flawed, with most being urban inhabitants and not from the rural villages they would be working in. Reimbursement was haphazard as trainees in some regions did not receive stipends while those in other regions did. In January 2005, the government began distributing antiretroviral drugs, hoping to reach up to 30,000 HIV-infected adults.

According to the head of the World Bank's Global HIV/AIDS Program, in 2007 Ethiopia had only 1 medical doctor per 100,000 people. However, the World Health Organization in its 2006 World Health Report gives a figure of 1936 physicians (for 2003), which is about 2.6 per 100,000. There were 119 hospitals (12 in Addis Ababa alone) and 412 health centers in Ethiopia in 2005. Globalization and low salaries negatively affect the country, with many educated professionals leaving Ethiopia for a better economic opportunity in better-developed countries.

Ethiopia's main health problems are said to be communicable diseases caused by poor sanitation and malnutrition. These problems are exacerbated by the shortage of trained manpower and health facilities. Ethiopia had a relatively low average life expectancy of 62/65 years in 2012. Only 20 percent of children nationwide have been immunized against all six vaccine-preventable diseases: tuberculosis, diphtheria, whooping cough, tetanus, polio, and measles. Rates of immunization are less than 3% of children in Afar and Somali Regions and less than 20% in Amhara, Benishangul-Gumuz, and Gambela. In contrast, almost 70% of children have received all vaccinations in Addis Ababa and 43% in Dire Dawa; children in urban areas were three times as likely to be fully immunized as children living in rural areas in 2008.

In 2019, a movement called Ethiopia Health Professionals Movement, (EHPM), a collective of doctors formed in 2019. They issued a 12 point list of demands to the government, asking for an increase in salaries, health insurance, transport support, and improved workplace conditions. After this request was ignored by the government, they began to go on strike. As of the 2020s, Ethiopia's healthcare workers are paid the lowest in East Africa, according to the World Bank. The Ethiopian government has declared the strikes illegal and cracked down, arresting many healthcare workers. Soaring inflation, the COVID-19 pandemic, and the two year Tigray War, have disrupted Ethiopia's already-strained healthcare industry.

== Health Extension Program ==
The Health Extension Program (HEP) was introduced in 2002/03 with a fundamental philosophy that if the right health knowledge and skill is transferred, households can take responsibility for producing and maintaining their own health. It is a community-based intervention designed to make basic health services accessible to the rural and underserved segments of the population. The HEP was launched in the four big agrarian regions, expanded to the remaining regions in subsequent years.

It was planned to cover all rural kebeles with the aim of achieving universal primary health care coverage by 2008. Services are organized along geographic lines with construction of a comprehensive network of primary health care units throughout the country with one health post in every rural kebele of 5000 people linked to a referral health center. A health post is a two-room structure of most peripheral health care unit and the first level for the provision of healthcare for the community, emphasizing preventive and promotive care. 33,819 health extension workers were trained and deployed surpassing the target of 33,033. Model households who have been trained and graduated have reached a cumulative total of 4,061,532 from an eligible total of 15,850,457 households. This only represented a coverage of 26% leaving a huge gap of more than 11 million households to be trained.

The total number of health professionals increased from the baseline of 6,191 in 2004/05 to 14,416 in 2009/10 but this was only 89% of the target. Equipping Health posts with medical kits remained a major challenge. Only 83.1% or 13,510 HPs out the planned target of 16,253 were fully equipped. Supportive supervision technical, reference books for rural HEP and manuals for school health program were prepared. An implementation Manual for Pastoralist and semi-pastoralist areas was finalized and distributed to respective regions. In order to expand the Urban Health Extension program in seven regions of the country, 15 packages along with implementation manual were developed and distributed for implementation in Tigray, Amhara, Oromia, the Southern Nations, Nationalities, and Peoples' Region, Harari, Dire Dawa, and Addis Ababa. These regions have trained and deployed a total of 2,319 Urban Health Extension workers achieving 42% of the required number.

The focus is disease prevention and health promotion, with limited curative care. It is the healthcare service delivery mechanism of the people, by the people, and for the people by involving the community in the whole process of healthcare delivery and by encouraging them to maintain their own health. The program involves women in decision-making processes and promotes community ownership, empowerment, autonomy and self-reliance. Ethiopia has achieved most health related Millennium Development Goals.

Addressing equity and quality of health services are the main focuses of the new Ethiopian Health Sector Transformation Plan. Improving the competence of health extension workers and the Women's Development Army is crucial. The second generation rural plan will include: upgrading health extension workers to level four Community Health Nurses, renovation and expansion of health posts, equipping and supplying health posts with the necessary equipment and supplies, shifting basic services to the community level and institutionalizing the WDA platform. In cities and urban areas, the Family Health Team approach will be introduced. The team will be composed of clinicians, public health professionals, environmental technicians, other health professional, social workers and health extension professionals to provide services for urban dwellers. Considering the varied nature of the community residing in the pastoralist and developing regions, the Ministry of Health, along with the Regional Health Bureaus is committed to developing a unique strategy to address pastoralist communities' health issues.

=== Health facility construction and expansion ===
Major activities under the health facility construction, expansion, rehabilitation, furnishing and equipping focused mainly on the primary healthcare facilities: the number of public health centres increased from 412 in 1996/97 to 519 in 2003/04. For the same periods, the number of HPs increased from 76 in 1996/97 to 2,899. The number of hospitals (both public and private) increased from 87 in 1996/97 to 126 in 2003/04. There has been also considerable health facility rehabilitation program and furnishing. As a result, the potential health service coverage increased from 45% in 1996/97 to 64.02% by 2003/04. The plan was to attain a 100% general potential health service coverage by availing 3200 centres through construction, equipping and furnishing of 253 new ones and upgrading 1,457 HSs to HC level and also upgrading of 30% of HC to enable them perform emergency obstetric and neonatal care services.

At the beginning of HSDP III, there were 82 all types of hospitals (37 district, 39 zonal and 6 specialized hospitals). The planned target was to increase the number of hospitals to 89 (42 district and 41 zonal). By 2008/09 there were 111 public hospitals.

In addition, 12,292 health posts have been equipped which represents 75.6% of the target of equipping 16,253 health posts. 511 new ones will be equipped following their completion. The construction of 21 blood banks in six regions was 95% completed in 2009 and the preparation of a National Laboratory Master Plan has also been already completed.

== Health human resource development ==
There has been a focus on scaling up the training of community and mid-level health professionals. Accelerated Health Officer Training Program was launched in 2005, in five universities and 20 hospitals to address the clinical service and public health sector management need at district level. So far more than 5,000 health officer trainees (generic and upgrade) have been enrolled and 3,573 health officers were graduated and deployed. In addition to address the need for comprehensive emergency obstetric care and other emergency surgery services, a curriculum for masters program on emergency surgery has been developed and training has been started in five universities. To address the critical shortage and maldistribution of doctors, in addition to the existing medical schools a new medical school that uses innovative approach has been opened in St. Paul's Hospital Millennium Medical College.

A human resources for health situation analysis conducted in 2015/2016 showed that between 2009 and 2014/15:

- The number of medical schools increased from 7 to 35 (28 public and 7 private)
- Annual enrollment of medical students increased from 200 to 4,000.
- The number of physicians in the country increased from 1,540 to 5,372.
- Midwifery teaching institutions increased from 23 to 49.
- The number of midwives increased from 1,270 to 11,349

Apart from these selected health professionals, overall health professionals to population ratio increased from 0.84 per 1000 in 2010 to 1.5 per 1000 in 2016. This is remarkable progress for a 5-year period. If the current pace is sustained, Ethiopia will be able to meet the minimum threshold of health professionals to population ratio of 2.3 per 1000 population, the 2025 benchmark set by the World Health Organization (WHO), for Sub-Saharan Africa.

Table 3: The total number of available Human Resource for Health during the successive HSDP phases
HR Category	End HSDP I		1994 HSDP II		End 1997 HSDP III	
Total No	Ratio to population	Total No	Ratio to population	Total No	Ratio to Population	
All physicians	1,888	1:35,603	1,996	1:35,604	2152	1: 34,986
Specialist	652	1:103,098	775	1:91,698	1151	1:62,783
General practitioners	1,236	1: 54,385	1221	1:58,203	1001	1:76,302
Public health officers	484	1:138,884	683	1:104,050	3,760	1: 20,638
Nurses Bsc, & Diploma (except midwives)	11,976	1:5,613	14,270	1: 4,980	20109	1: 4,895
Midwives (Senior)	862	1:77,981	1,274	1: 55,782	1379	1: 57,354
Pharmacists	118	1:569,661	172	1:413,174	661	1: 117,397
Pharmacy Tech.	793	1: 84,767	1171	1: 60,688	3013	1: 25,755
Environmental HW	971	1: 69,228	1169	1: 60,792	1,819	1: 42,660
Laboratory technicians & technologists	1,695	1:39,657	2,403	1: 29,574	2,989	1: 25,961
Health Extension Workers	–	–	2,737	1: 23,775	31,831	1: 2,437

== Health insurance ==
A strategy on health Insurance was developed since 2008. To increase access to health care and reduce household vulnerability to out of pocket health expenditure.

Table 1 source of health financing in Ethiopia
	Source	share of health spending
1	Donors	36%
2	Households (OOP)	33%
3	Government	30%
4	Private sectors	1%

As shown in the table above, this is the source of health financing that can be seen in Ethiopia, which explains that the donors, households and government have almost equal expenditures. To minimize financial disasters, the government has developed an affordable health insurance strategy. The strategy identified two types of health insurance Provided with essential health care regardless of their economic status and ability.

1. Social health insurance (SHI) is a formal sector affordable only for rich people.
2. Community-based health insurance (CBHI) is for rural & urban informal sector.

The SIH system doesn't include 85% poorest society of Ethiopian living in a rural area, so I have given attention to CBHI.

=== Community-based health insurance development ===
Pilot implementation was initiated in 2011 in 13 districts in four big regions (Oromia, Amhara, Tigray and South nation and nationality). The aim is to reach and cover the very large rural and agricultural sector and small informal sectors in an urban setting. To give equitable, accessible and increased financial risk protection.

==== Community-based health insurance design features ====
by Institutional Arrangement

- The scheme is established at Woreda (district) level
- The scheme is managed by three full-time CBHI Executive staff at Woreda level
- There is a section of the schemes at each sub-district level
- General Assembly and Board at Woreda level serve as a governance structure
- Regional and Zonal Steering Committees play a leadership role
- Ethiopian Health Insurance Agency plays a significant technical and capacity-building role

The main objective of CBHI in Ethiopia

- To remove financial barriers
- To reduce catastrophic out-of-pocket expenditure (OOP)
- To increase health service utilization
- To improve quality of care, by increasing resources for health facilities through strong community involvement and ownership and strategic purchasing
- To enhance equity in health
- To mobilize domestic resource and accounts

==== Membership ====
Membership to CBHI schemes is currently on a voluntary basis, planned to move to a mandatory system. Enrollment is done on a household, not on an individual basis, to reduce the possibility of adverse selection. Indigents are eligible to be a member of CBHI schemes after screened by the sub-district leader. Premium/contribution collected once in a year (mostly January to March).

==== Benefit package ====
The benefits packages emanated from the national essential service list. Services included in the benefits package: Outpatient department and Inpatient department services - Examination, laboratory/diagnosis, drugs, hospitalization. Services are accessed mostly from public health centers and primary hospitals.

==== Exclusions ====
Excluded services are tooth implantation and eyeglasses for ophthalmic cases.

==== Achievements ====
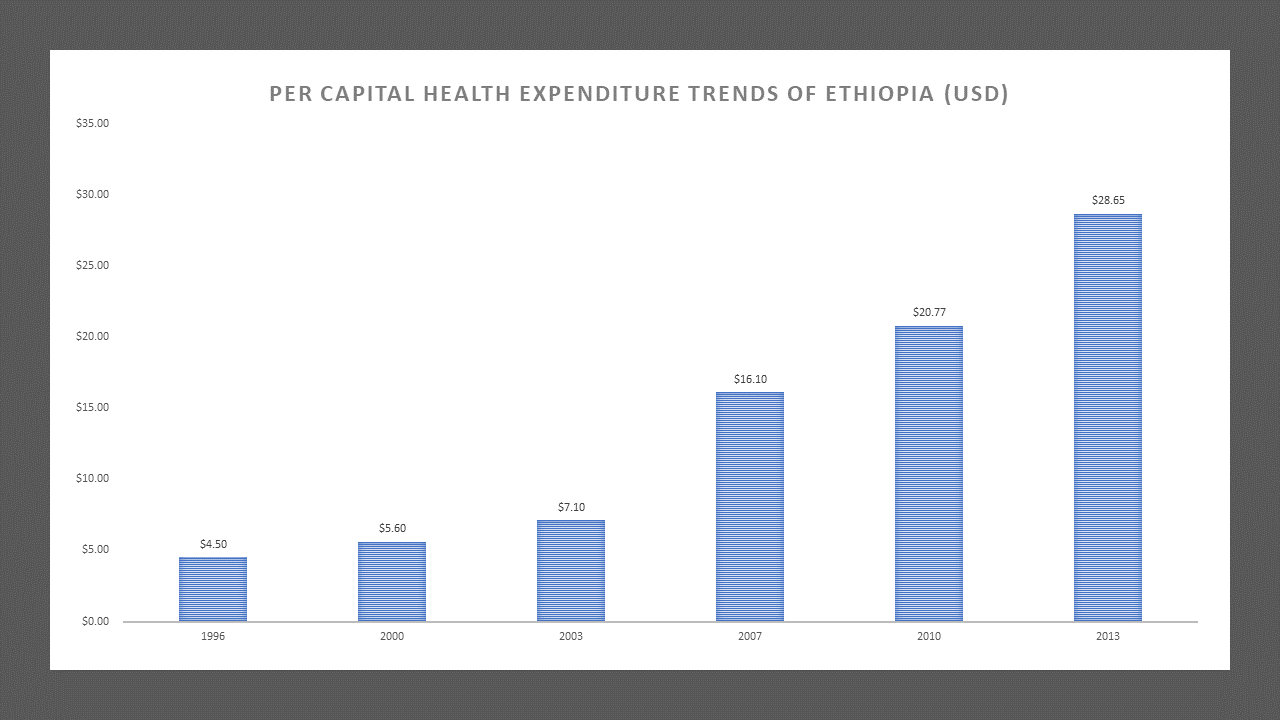
Per capital health expenditure of Ethiopia (USD)

Program reports and small-scale studies showed it improved: service utilization, financial hardship, health care quality and women’s decision-making capacity in health care. The figure also shows the improvement in per capita health expenditure in Ethiopia from 1996 to 2013.

==== Achievements: effects on health service quality ====
CBHI has contributed to improvements in the quality of healthcare services through an Increased flow of resources that are predictable, clinical audit findings help to identify crucial challenges encountered by the health facilities and improved community demand. In addition to this, it has other achievements like contributing to women's empowerment and its impact on equity and reduction in financial hardship not yet studied.

== Indicators ==
Table 4: Numbers of different level and types of Health Facilities in 2018
Indicator description	Value
Hospitals	234
Health centers	3586
Health posts	11,446
Health stations +NHC	1,517
Private clinics for profit	1,788
Private clinics not for profit	271
Pharmacies	320
Drug shops	577
Rural drug vendors	2,121

== See also ==
- Health in Ethiopia
- Women's health in Ethiopia
- Maternal health in Ethiopia
- Abortion in Ethiopia
- HIV/AIDS in Ethiopia
- COVID-19 pandemic in Ethiopia
