= Ayder Hospital =

Teaching hospital in Ethiopia

Ayder Comprehensive Specialized Hospital is the largest hospital in Mekele in the Tigray Region and the second largest hospital in Ethiopia.

== Description and history ==
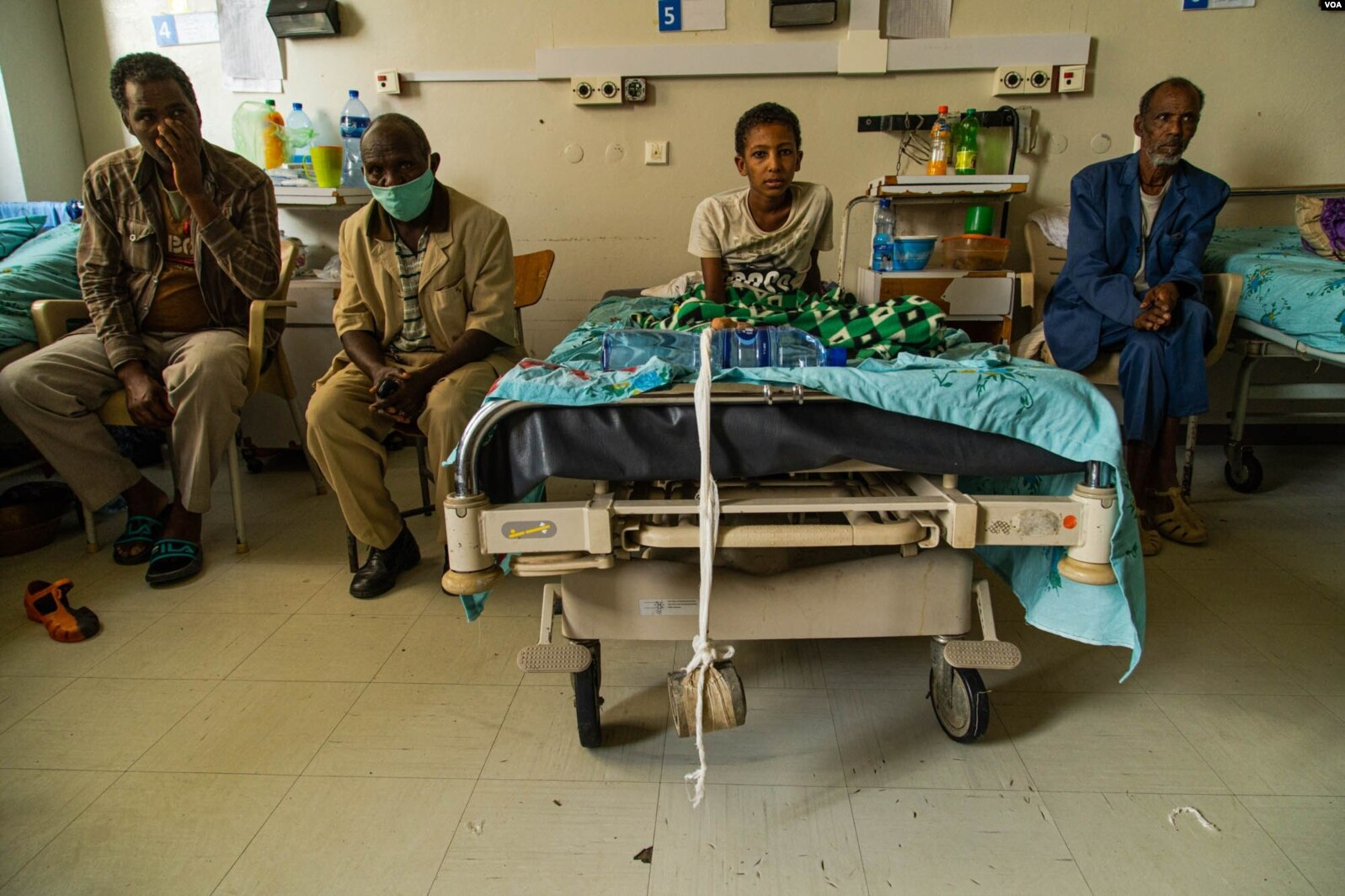
A patient, 4 June 2021

Located in Mekele, the teaching hospital is the largest hospital in the Tigray Region and the second largest hospital in Ethiopia. It is one of only a few referral hospitals in Ethiopia.

The hospital opened in 2008 and serves a population of over 8 million people. The hospital's services include: newborn care, dialysis, and cancer care. It is the only one in the Tigray Region with surgery facilities and, in 2015, became the only hospital with magnetic resonance imaging facilities.

In 2022, the hospital had an estimate of 3,600 staff with Kibrom Gebreselassie as the Chief Executive Director.

In 2020, during the Tigray War, the hospital's staff struggled to keep up with the influx of trauma patients and was running low in surgical supplies. In 2022, over 60 patients with kidney disease died due to lack of medical supplies and 81 patients died due to a lack of medical oxygen. The hospital remained short of medical supplies in January 2023, after the war ended.

== See also ==
- Healthcare in Ethiopia
- List of hospitals in Ethiopia
