= Tirunesh Beijing General Hospital =

Public hospital in Addis Ababa, Ethiopia

Geography
- Location: Woreda 1, Akaki Kality, Addis Ababa, Ethiopia
- Coordinates: 8.877°N 38.789°E

Organisation
- Care system: Specialized
- Type: Public

Services
- Beds: 202

History
- Constructed: 23 October 2009
- Opened: 5 March 2012

Links
- Website: www.tbgh.gov.et
- Lists: Hospitals in Ethiopia

Tirunesh Beijing General Hospital (Chinese: 提露内丝-北京医院, Amharic: ጥሩነሽ ቤጂንግ አጠቃላይ ሆስፒታል) is a specialized public hospital located in Akaki Kality Sub-City Woreda 1 in Addis Ababa, Ethiopia. The hospital was constructed by the Chinese government with 80 yuan (ETB 91,924,840) grant for Phase 1 project, which was completed in November 2011. It was named after the famous Ethiopian athlete Tirunesh Dibaba, who won a medal in the 2008 Beijing Olympics.

On 5 March 2012, the hospital was inaugurated by mayor of Addis Ababa Kuma Demeksa. In 2016, the hospital began its full operation.

== History ==
Tirunesh Beijing General Hospital was constructed by the Chinese government with support of Addis Ababa City Administration. The hospital is commemorated for the renowned athlete Tirunesh Dibaba, who won medal in the 2008 Beijing Olympics. It is located in Addis Ababa City Akaki Kality Sub-City Woreda 1.

On 29 July 2009, the contract agreement for Phase 1 signed in the Ministry of Health of Ethiopia and a foundation stone laid on 6 June 2009. The project was commenced on 23 October 2009 and ended on 16 November 2011. On 5 March 2012, the hospital was inaugurated by Mayor of Addis Ababa Kuma Demeksa. The hospital began offering full operation on 4 March 2016.
