= Mekdes Daba =

Ethiopian politician

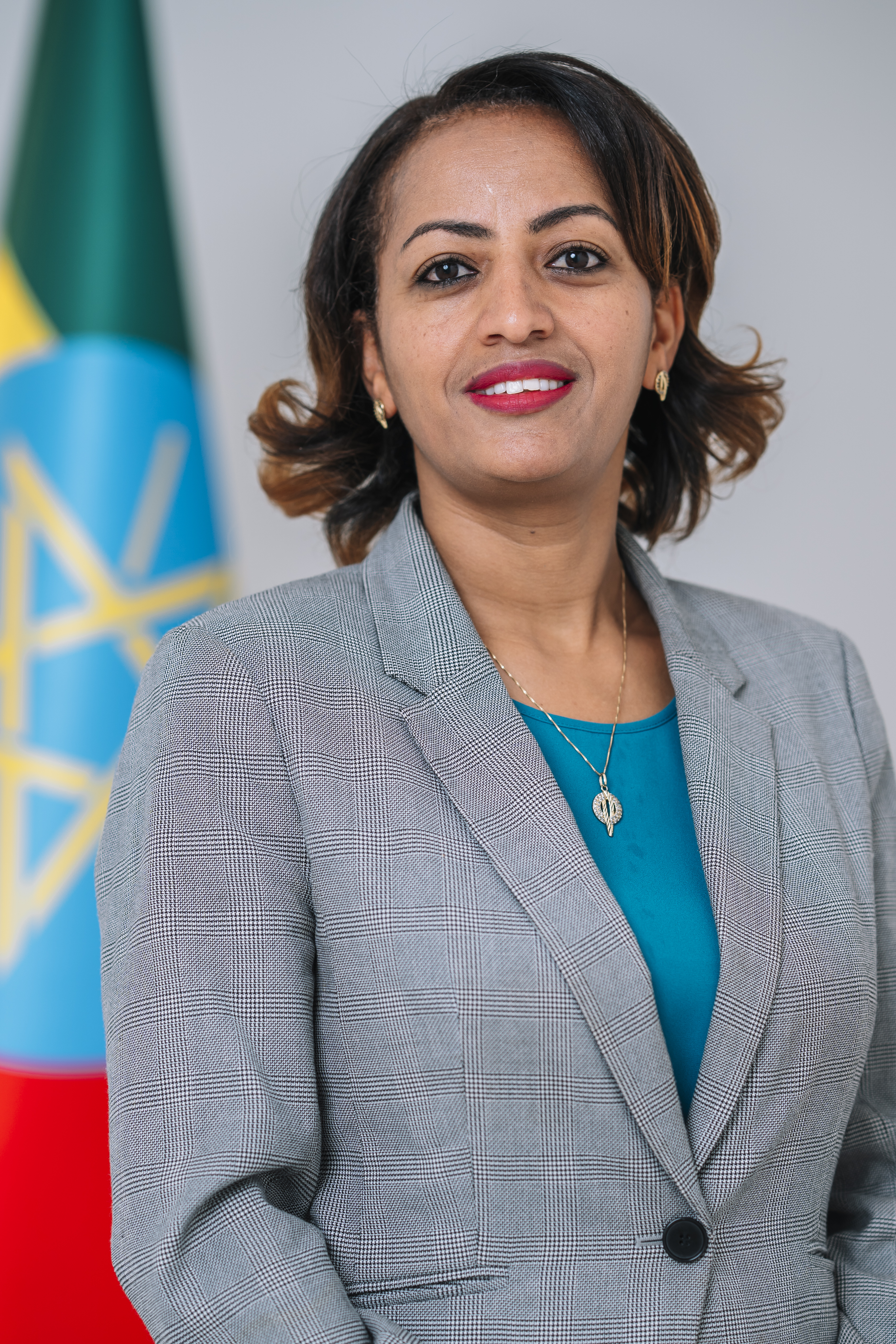

Minister of Health
- Incumbent
- Assumed office 8 February 2024
- President: Sahle-Work Zewde; Taye Atske Selassie
- Prime Minister: Abiy Ahmed
- Preceded by: Lia Tadesse

Personal details
- Born: Mekdes Daba Feyssa
- Education: Hawassa University; Addis Ababa University; St. Paul's Hospital Millennium Medical College

Mekdes Daba Feyssa (Amharic: መቅደስ ዳባ ፈይሳ) is an Ethiopian politician who was appointed as Minister of Health in February 2024, previously served as the president of the Ethiopian Obstetricians and Gynecologists Association (ESOG) and held a role as team lead at the Deputy Director General Office of the World Health Organization in Geneva. Her notable contributions were acknowledged with the FIGO Award in November 2021 for her exceptional work in obstetrics and gynecology.

== Education ==
Daba completed her undergraduate medical degree at Hawassa University, and undertook residency training in obstetrics and gynaecology at Addis Ababa University. She also completed a family-planning fellowship at St Paul's Hospital Millennium Medical College and a post-doctoral fellowship at WHO. Daba is the first female Family Planning and Reproductive Health sub-specialist in Ethiopia according to Ethiopian's ministry of health.

== Awards & recognition ==
- FIGO award (2021) for contributions in obstetrics and gynecology.
