= Lia Tadesse =

Ethiopian politician (born 1976)

- ሊያ ታደሰ
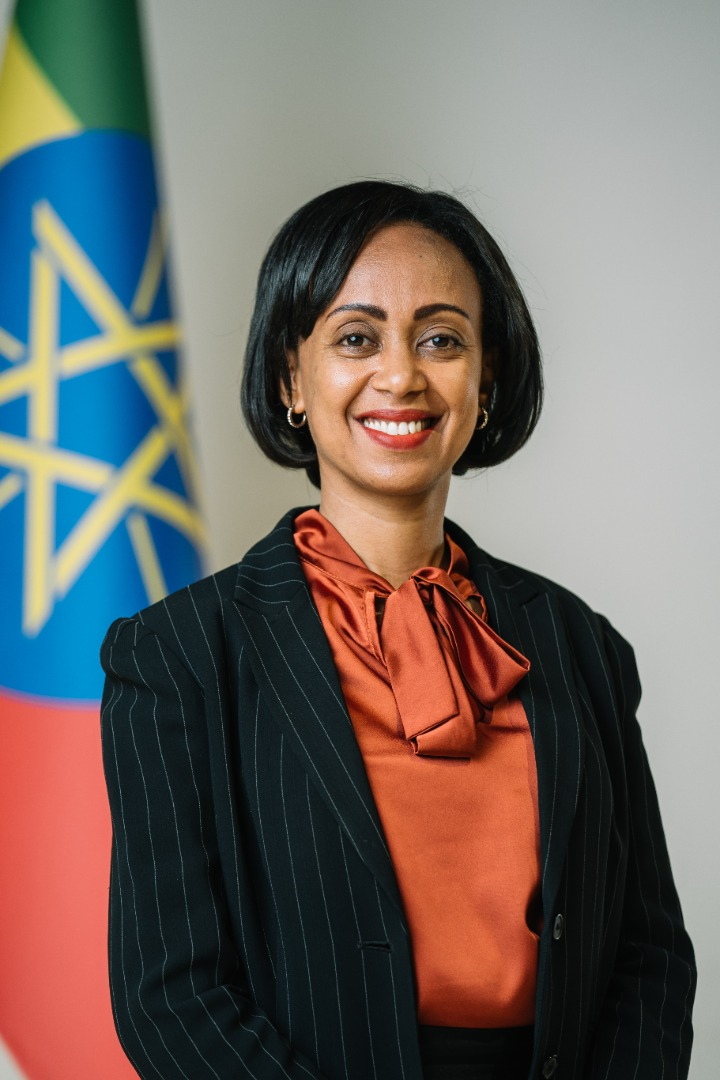
- Lia Tadesse in 2024

Minister of Health
- In office 12 March 2020 – 8 February 2024
- President: Sahle-Work Zewde
- Prime Minister: Abiy Ahmed
- Preceded by: Amir Aman
- Succeeded by: Mekdes Daba

State Minister of Health of Ethiopia
- In office November 2018 – March 2020
- President: Sahle-Work Zewde
- Prime Minister: Abiy Ahmed

Personal details
- Born: 1976 (age 49–50) Addis Ababa, Ethiopia
- Party: Prosperity Party
- Education: Jimma University; Addis Ababa University
- Awards: Next Generation Award of Harvard School

Lia Tadesse Gebremedhin (Amharic: ሊያ ታደሰ ገብረመድኅን; born 1976) is an Ethiopian physician who served as the Minister of Health from 12 March 2020 until 8 February 2024. Prior to her appointment, Lia served as State Minister of Health from November 2018. She also served as an Executive Director at the University of Michigan's Center for International Reproductive Health Training (CIRHT) in Ann Arbor, Michigan, as a CEO and Vice Provost in St. Paul's Hospital Millennium Medical College (SPHMMC) in Addis Ababa and as a Project Director of USAID's Maternal and Child Survival Program (MCSP) at Jhpiego-Ethiopia.

== Early life ==
Lia was born and raised in Addis Ababa, Ethiopia. She went to Miskaye Hizunan Medhanealem School for her elementary school studies and completed her secondary school at Etege Menen Secondary School with a great distinction, and joined Jimma University to study Medicine; she was among the four eligible female students to enroll. Lia earned a medical degree, and also has taken a specialty training in obstetrics and gynecology from Addis Ababa University, and a Master of Science in health care administration from Jimma University, where she earned medical degree. Because her father was an entomologist (Doctor of Philosophy of Entomology) and her mother was a teacher, from a young age she had a strong interest in becoming a Doctor of Medicine.

== Career ==
Lia served as the CEO and Vice Provost of St. Paul's Hospital Millennium Medical College in Addis Ababa Ethiopia for seven consecutive years since 2007. Prior to this, she was a senior obstetrician and gynecologist at the Federal Police Referral Hospital in Addis Ababa, Ethiopia. She served over 20 years in the Health Sector. Lia has been the program director for Center for International Reproductive Health Training (CIRHT) at the University of Michigan in Ann Arbor for three years since August 2015 and was a Project Director of Maternal and Child Survival Project at Jhpiego-Ethiopia for almost a year before that. In November 2018, Lia was appointed as a State Minister in the Federal Democratic Republic of Ethiopia Ministry of Health, and was promoted to Minister of Health in March 2020. On 8 February 2024, Lia left the minister position and replaced by Mekdes Daba.

== Awards ==
According to Ethiopian News Agency, "[Lia] received the recognition award, Next Generation Award of Harvard School, for her strong contribution for enhancement of the health sector in Ethiopia and in other local and international organizations".
