= Teferi Mekonnen Polytechnic College =

Vocational college in Addis Ababa, Ethiopia

- ተፈሪ መኮንን ፖሊቴክኒክ ኮሌጅ
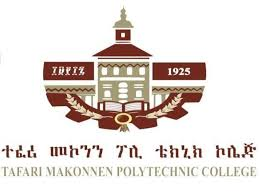
- Former names: Teferi Mekonnen School; Entoto Technical and Vocational Education and Training College (until 2025)
- Type: Public vocational college
- Established: 27 April 1925; 101 years ago
- Founder: Ras Tafari Mekonnen
- Chairman: Mr. Demelash Tesfaye
- Rector: Teshome Feissa
- Location: Gullele subcity, Addis Ababa, Ethiopia; 9.05116°N 38.76253°E
- Website: tmptc.edu.et

Teferi Mekonnen Polytechnic College (Amharic: ተፈሪ መኮንን ፖሊቴክኒክ ኮሌጅ), formerly known as Teferi Mekonnen School or later Entoto Technical and Vocational Education and Training College until 2025, is a public technical and vocational educational training (TVET) college located in Gullele area, in Addis Ababa, Ethiopia. It was established as Teferi Mekonnen School in 1925 by Ras Tafari Mekonnen (later Emperor Haile Selassie) to address modern education in Ethiopia.

In June 2025, it was renamed as Teferi Mekonnen Polytechnic College during its 100th anniversary.

== History ==
Tefari Mekonnen School was founded on 27 April 1925 by Regent Ras Tafari Makonnen (later Emperor Haile Selassie I). At that time, the school facility costed 300,000 Maria Theresa dollars featuring modern classrooms, a library, a laboratory, and dormitories. It was the first public school as well as early modern school in Ethiopia, but it drew backlashes from the public, who favored traditional style in education platform and accused promoting European style education system. Ras Tafari remarked in opening ceremony on 2 May that "true patriotism needs education that protects sovereignty of the country".

Teferi Mekonnen School used to teaching of religion, mathematics, law and calligraphy as Menelik II School, led by French headmasters. It was known as the Entoto Technical and Vocational Education and Training College throughout decades. In June 2025, the school was renamed as Teferi Mekonnen Polytechnic College to mark its 100th anniversary.

== Notable alumni ==
- Beyene Haile, Eritrean writer, public administrator and founder of the Eritrean Center for Organizational Excellence.
