= Adanech Kidanemariam =

Ethiopian nurse and government minister (1943–2016)

Minister of Health
- In office 1991–1994

Personal details
- Born: 1943
- Died: 2016 (aged 72–73)
- Education: Gondar College of Public Health
- Occupation: Nurse; Public health educator

Adanech Kidanemariam (1943–2016) was an Ethiopian nurse, public health educator and government minister. She was appointed Minister of Health in Ethiopia in 1991.

== Life ==
In the late 1960s Adanech Kidanemariam was a student activist, with a reputation for political commitment and courage.

She graduated from the medical school formerly known as Gondar College of Public Health, and started her career as a community nurse and midwife. She also taught public health and was head of the public health department in Addis Ababa University's medical faculty. In 1984 she was working for the Ethiopian Department of Community Health (DCH), when it launched The Ethiopian Journal of Health Development.

Appointed minister of health in 1991, she held the post for three years.

== Writing ==
- (with Azeb Tamirat) 'Gender influence on women's health'. In Tsehai Berhane-Selassie, ed., Gender issues in Ethiopia. Addis Ababa: Institute of Ethiopian Studies, Addis Ababa University, 1991.
