= Arba Minch University =

National research university in Arba Minch, South Ethiopia Regional State, Ethiopia

Arba Minch University (AMU)
- አርባምንጭ ዩኒቨርሲቲ
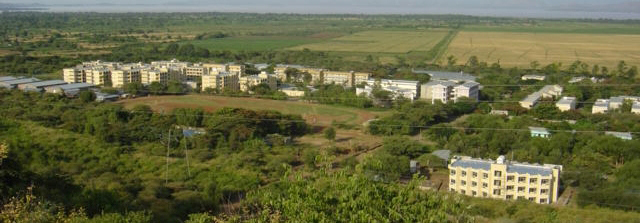
- Type: National
- Established: September 1986
- President: Dr. Abdela Kemal
- Academic staff: 156
- Students: 39,000 (2018)
- Location: Arba Minch, South Ethiopia Regional State, Ethiopia; 6.065284°N 37.560095°E
- Campus: Residential
- Language: English
- Website: www.amu.edu.et

- Location in Ethiopia

Arba Minch University (AMU) (Amharic: አርባ ምንጭ ዩኒቨርሲቲ) is a residential national university in Arba Minch, South Ethiopia Regional State, Ethiopia. It is approximately 435 kilometres (270 mi) south of Addis Ababa, Ethiopia. The Ministry of Education admits qualified students to Arba Minch University based on their score on the Ethiopian Higher Education Entrance Examination. Arba Minch University has two premier institutes; Arba Minch Water Technology Institute (AWTI), a premier institute in the region popularly known as the center of excellence for water management research in Africa. Another institute is Arba Minch University Institute of Technology (AMUIT), known for its contributions in renewable energy and digital innovations. The university has several colleges (college of natural sciences, college of agriculture, college of humanities and social sciences and college of health sciences)spread over four main campuses around the city Arba Minch. Arba Minch is known for its 40 natural springs of fresh water where the university is located.

== History ==
The nucleus of the university has its origins in the Arba Minch Water Technology Institute (established in September 1986). In 1993, the institute was transferred from the Water Resource Commission to the Ministry of Education.

On 20 September 2004, Arba Minch University was established by government proclamation (Council of Ministers 111/2004). The University originally consisted of Water Technology Institute, Faculty of Engineering, Faculty of Science, Faculty of Social Science and Humanities, and Faculty of business and Economics, Faculty of Electrical Engineering and Faculty of Civil Engineering and School of Graduate Studies.

== Academics ==
The university runs 74 undergraduate programs, 115 graduate programs, and 27 PhD programs. AMU consists of three institutes, six colleges, and four schools which are situated across the university's six campuses: Main Campus, Abaya Campus, Chamo Campus, Kulfo Campus, and Nech Sar Campus, and Sawla Campus.

Institutes

- Arba Minch Institute of Water Technology
- Arba Minch Institute of Technology
- Institute of Culture & Language Studies

Colleges

- College of Natural & Computational Sciences
- College of Social Sciences and Humanities
- College of Business and Economics
- College of Medicine and Health Sciences (affiliated with Arba Minch General Hospital
- College of Agricultural Sciences
- College of Distance & Continuing Education

Schools

- School of Post-Graduate Studies
- School of Law
- School of Public Health
- School of Behavioral & Pedagogical Sciences

== See also ==
- List of universities and colleges in Ethiopia
- Education in Ethiopia
