= Daniachew Worku =

Ethiopian writer (1936–1994)

- ዳኛቸው ወርቁ
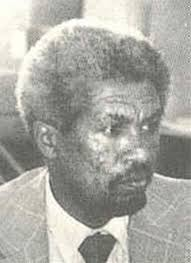
- Born: 24 February 1936; Debre Sina, Shewa, Ethiopian Empire
- Died: 1 December 1994 (aged 58); Yekatit 12 Hospital, Addis Ababa, Ethiopia
- Cause of death: Food poisoning
- Resting place: Medhane Alem Church, Debre Sina
- Education: Lycée Guebre-Mariam
- Alma mater: Haile Selassie I University
- Occupation: Writer
- Writing career
- Language: Amharic; English
- Genres: Modern fiction; drama; poetry
- Subjects: Age and youth, progress and pastoral purity, spirituality and material wealth, mysticism and realism
- Notable work: The Thirteenth Sun (1973)
- Literary movement: Modern literary

Dagnechew Worku (Amharic: ዳኛቸው ወርቁ; 24 February 1936 – 1 December 1994) was an Ethiopian writer whose works include novels, plays and short stories. He wrote in both Amharic and English.

He gained international recognition after his second novel, The Thirteenth Sun (1973), was published in Heinemann's African Writers Series and translated into German and Portuguese.

== Biography ==
=== Birth and early influences ===
Daniachew Worku was born in a village south of Debre Sina, the eldest of five children. His family moved to the town of Debra Sina when he was four.

His father, Worku Bezabih, went to France in 1914 and served in World War I before returning to Ethiopia and marrying his mother, Asegedech Habte-Wold. His early life was shaped by the Italian Occupation and a number of encounters the family had with occupying troops. As a result of this, his father fled the family home for a year.

He attended a government school in Debra Sina and also briefly attended the Lycée Guebre-Mariam. His education was unusual at a time when most children attended a church school.

During these early years Daniachew started to write poems and record folk tales told to him by his mother. He also read works by Kebede Michael, Makonnen Endelkachew, and Heruy Wolde Selassie.

=== Schooling ===
Daniachew left home at 12 to join Haile Selassie Secondary School in Kotebe, Addis Ababa. While there he wrote ሰው ኦለ ብዬ (Saw ‘ala beyé), a play with friendship as its major theme. It was published some years later.

He went on to Teacher Training School in Addis Ababa before becoming a teacher of Amharic at Medhane Alem Secondary School in Harar for two years. While in Harar he wrote another play called ሰቀቀንሽ እሳት (Seqeqenish isat), which depicts a traditional hierarchical society. This was staged at the school and later in Addis Ababa, where he taught for a further two years at the Technical School. It was with the money raised from these performances that he published ሰው ኦለ ብዬ (Saw ‘ala beyé).

During this time Daniachew also began writing book, play and film reviews for local newspapers.

=== University College Addis Ababa ===
Daniachew joined University College Addis Ababa in 1960, where he began to write poems that were later collected in ሾምቧ በሉ ሰዎች (Imbuwa balu sewoch). The 13 poems can be characterised by protest, satire and social criticism. After graduating with a BA in Ethiopian Languages and Literatures he became a graduate assistant, before being promoted to assistant lecturer, then lecturer. He also continued to write plays, staging the tragedy ትበልጭ (Tibelch) at the Haile Selassie I Theatre.

=== International Writing Program at the University of Iowa ===
In 1967, Daniachew became one of 12 writers to join the first year of the International Writing Program at the University of Iowa. He obtained a master's degree in Fine Arts and published a short story, Mammite, which tells the story of a young boy's changing attitude to his maid during the Italian Occupation. He also produced a series of eight unpublished stories as part of the Writing Program. Kurtz argues that some of Daniachew's writing during this time provided the basis for his English-language novel, The Thirteenth Sun.

=== Return to Ethiopia ===
Daniachew returned to his university teaching post after his year in America. During the next five years, and leading up to the Ethiopian Revolution of 1974, he published two novels and numerous short stories and articles. Many of these stories and articles appeared in the Ethiopian Herald newspaper. One, The Voice, later appeared in the Iowa Review.

First edition, 1969

=== አደፍርስ (Adefris) ===
Daniachew's first novel, አደፍርስ (Adefris), was written in Amharic and published in 1969. It is described as providing a panoramic view of Ethiopian society before the revolution.

The novel begins in the village of Armanya, near Debre Sina, where a wealthy and conservative widow lives with her daughter, her land agent and his daughter. The widow rents rooms to Ato Tiso, a judge visiting the area from Addis Ababa to rule on local disputes. The judge is accompanied by his own daughter, his sister, and her son, Adefris. Adefris is a university student sent to the countryside to complete his national service as a teacher. A love triangle develops between Adefris and the two daughters of the house, before conflict ensues. Adefris continues his teaching assignment, challenging traditional attitudes. Students then begin to demonstrate in the town and Adefris is struck and killed by a stone.

The novel was received poorly upon its release, including among other writers and intellectuals who challenged its lack of narrative and use of language. Sahle Sellassie concludes: 'There is no central theme on which the attention of the reader can dwell as in conventional novels. There is no development of a story as such, because there is no story in the first place. The whole book is about the various aspects of traditional values and customs. The characters are eternally arguing about the pros and cons of Ethiopian culture.'

This criticism led to the author trying to withdraw circulation and stockpiling unsold copies in his house. He considered this his most important work, but following the negative response he announced he would no longer write in Amharic. It was only later that the novel began to receive widespread appreciation.

First edition, 1973

=== The Thirteenth Sun ===
Daniachew wrote his second novel in English. It was published in 1973 as part of Heinemann's African Writers Series and later translated into German and Portuguese. The cover features a photo by George Hallett.

The plot centres on Fitawrary Woldu, an ageing nobleman undertaking a pilgrimage to St Abbo's Shrine on Mount Zuqualla. The old man is dying of heart disease and travels in hope of a cure. Carried by his servants and accompanied by his son Goytam and daughter Woynitu, the story unfolds over six days as they ascend the mountain to the shrine and then carry the old man's body down after he dies.

The Thirteenth Sun appeared as number 125 in Heinemann's African Writers Series, the second novel by an Ethiopian author to appear in the series after Sahle Sellassie's The Afersata. It is described as 'one of the most extraordinary novels to appear in the African Writers Series'. Its release in Ethiopia was disrupted amid concerns that it would be censored by the government of Haile Selassie, with small numbers reportedly sold under the counter of the United Nations bookshop in Addis Ababa. In 1974, the first demonstrations of what would become the Ethiopian Revolution created an opportunity for a wider release, and Heinemann took the opportunity to import additional copies.

=== Later years and death ===
After the revolution Daniachew worked for the Ethiopian Standards Institute, as an external examiner at Addis Ababa University and at the Kuraz Publishing Agency.

During these years he published a writing guide (የጽሔፍ ጥበብ መመሪያ), contributed to a dictionary of geographical terms (የአማርኛ የጂኦግራፊ መዝገበ ቃላት) and co-authored a book of Amharic idioms (የአማርኛ ፈሊጦች).

Daniachew died of food poisoning at Yekatit 12 Hospital and was buried at the Medhane Alem church in Debre Sina. At the time of his death he had reportedly completed a 650-page manuscript entitled 'Shout It From the Mountain Top'.

== Bibliography ==
=== Novels ===
- አደፍርስ (Adefris), Addis Ababa: Commercial Press, 1969; Lawrenceville: Red Sea Press, 2000.
- The Thirteenth Sun, London: Heinemann, 1973 (African Writers Series no. 125); Lawrenceville: Red Sea Press, 2000. The novel was translated into German by Karin von Schweder-Schreiner as Die dreizehnte Sonne, Olten: Walter-Verlag, 1980; and into Portuguese by Ana Maria Rabaça as O 13° Sol, Lisboa: Edicoes, 1979

=== Short stories ===
- 'Mammite', Confluence (October 1968). The story of a young boy's evolving attitude towards his mammite, or maid, during the Italian occupation.
- 'The house with the big Worka', The Ethiopian Herald (7 and 9 April 1974). The story of a mother's search for her teacher son in the city. The story was translated into Russian by M Volpe.
- 'Coming', The Ethiopian Herald (21 April 1974). The story of physical and mental brutality in a master-servant relationship.
- 'The Voice', The Ethiopian Herald' (28 April 1974) and the Iowa Review (1976). The story of an inhibited servant's change of fortune in a wealthy rural home.

=== Plays ===
- ሰው ኦለ ብዬ (Saw ‘ala beyé), Addis Ababa: Tesfa Printing Press, 1957.

=== Poetry ===
- ሾምቧ በሉ ሰዎች (Imbuwa balu sewoch), Addis Ababa: Berhanena Selem Printing Press, 1974.

=== Non-fiction ===
- 'Qene Ecclesiastical verse', The Ethiopian Herald, (9,16,22,20 August 1970)
- 'Point of View in Ethiopian Fiction', The Ethiopian Herald (6 September 1970).
- 'Time in Ethiopian Fiction', The Ethiopian Herald (13 September 1970).
- 'Setting in Ethiopian Fiction—Part 1', The Ethiopian Herald (20 September 1970).
- 'Setting in Ethiopian Fiction—Part 2', The Ethiopian Herald (4 October 1970).
- 'Novel of Incident, Manners: Review of Kadmas Bashager', The Ethiopian Herald (13 October 1970).
- 'Lijennat: Special Kind of Knowledge', The Ethiopian Herald (22 October 1970).
- 'Detective or Mystery Stories', The Ethiopian Herald (15 December 1970).
- የጽሔፍ ጥበብ መመሪያ (Yasahuf tebeb mammariya, ‘A Guide to Writing Skills’), Addis Ababa: Kuraz Publishing Agency, 1985.
- የአማርኛ የጂኦግራፊ መዝገበ ቃላት (contributor, Ya'amarenna yagiografi mazgaba qalat, ‘Amharic Dictionary of Geographical Terms’), Addis Ababa, 1986.
- የአማርኛ ፈሊጦች (with Amsalu Aklilu, Yaamarenna falitocc ‘Amharic Idioms’), Addis Ababa: Kuraz Publishing Agency, 1987.
