= Amanuel Mental Specialized Hospital =

Public psychatric hospital in Addis Ababa, Ethiopia

Geography
- Location: Kebele 08, Addis Ketema Sub-city, Addis Ababa, Ethiopia
- Coordinates: 9.0306°N 38.7222°E

Organisation
- Care system: Specialized healthcare
- Type: Public

Services
- Beds: 240–361

History
- Opened: 1937

Links
- Lists: Hospitals in Ethiopia

Amanuel Mental Specialized Hospital (Amharic: አማኑኤል የአእምሮ ስፔሻላይዝድ ሆስፒታል; AMSH) is a public psychiatric hospital in Ethiopia established in 1937, during Italian occupation. It is located in Addis Ababa's Addis Ketema Sub-city, Kebele 08.

Amanuel Mental Specialized Hospital has received 60,000 to 120,000 patients annually, accommodating 500-600 patients daily, more than 400 are outpatients.

== Background ==
Amanuel Mental Specialized Hospital was established in 1937 as a general hospital. It was established during Italian occupation in and shortly transferred to psychiatric hospital. The hospital is the only specialized mental health hospital in Ethiopia that operates approximately 240 to 361 beds across multiple wards, serving over 60,000 to 120,000 patients annually. It accommodates 500-600 patients daily, more than 400 are outpatients.

Amanuel Mental Specialized Hospital provides comprehensive mental health services, inpatient care and outpatient services with 17 departments and emergency care. The hospital hugely invested in expansion in every places in Addis Ababa, including the Eka Kotebe General Hospital, which was inaugurated in October 2019. The hospital main quarter is located in Addis Ketema Sub-city, Kebele 08.

== See also ==
- List of hospitals in Ethiopia
