= St. Paul's Hospital, Ethiopia =

Coordinates: 9°2′52″N 38°43′41″E

Geography
- Location: Addis Ababa, Ethiopia

Organisation
- Affiliated university: St. Paul's Hospital Millennium Medical College

Services
- Emergency department: Yes
- Beds: 700+

History
- Founded: Haile Selassie I in 1969

Links
- Website: sphmmc.edu.et
- Other links: List of hospitals in Ethiopia

The St. Paul's Hospital in Addis Ababa is the largest hospital in Ethiopia.

== History ==
The hospital was built by Emperor Haile Selassie I in 1969 with the help of the Evangelical Church in Germany. It aimed to serve the poor.

A medical college was formed in 2007.

== Capacity ==
The hospital has 550 beds sees an annual average of 300,000. It has a catchment population of more than 6 million.

The hospital has 1200 clinical and non-clinical staff

== Departments ==
There are over 13 departments which include:

- Forensic medicine and toxicology
- Internal medicine
- Neurology
- General Surgery
- ENT
- Psychiatry
- Ophthalmology
- Dentistry
- Maxillofacial Surgery)
- Radiology
- Dermatology
- Obstetrics and Gynecology
- Pediatrics
- Biomedicine
- Emergency Medicine and Critical Care
- Neurosurgery
- Orthopediacs and Traumatology
- Neurosurgery

== Medical School ==
A medical school, the Millennium Medical College was opened in 2007 to commemorate the new Millennium era of the Ethiopian Calendar (which is 7 years behind the Gregorian Calendar). Students admitted from each region of the country are required to pass written and oral (VIVA) entrance exams.

The school was established by the Ethiopian Ministry of Health with Gordon Williams of the department of urology at the Hammersmith Hospital in London as the first dean. He became the medical director of the Hamlin Fistula Hospital in Addis Ababa.

The enrollment is 40% female. There are links with University of Addis Ababa, Jimma University, Tulane University and University of Michigan as well as the Open University. The school's provost is Mesfin Araya, a psychiatrist.
