= Yekatit 12 Hospital =

Public hospital in Addis Ababa, Ethiopia

Geography
- Location: Weatheral St, Sidist Kilo, Addis Ababa, Ethiopia
- Coordinates: 9.04376°N 38.76003°E

Organisation
- Care system: Specialized healthcare
- Type: Public

Services
- Beds: 456

History
- Opened: 1923

Links
- Lists: Hospitals in Ethiopia

Yekatit 12 Hospital (Amharic: የካቲት 12 ሆስፒታል) is a public specialized healthcare institution established in 1923 by Ras Tafari Mekonnen (Haile Selassie). It was originally called Bete Sayida (Teferi Mekonnen) Hospital before renaming Yekatit 12 Hospital in 1937, to commemorate victims of the 1937 massacre by Italian fascist force.

== History ==
Yekatit 12 Hospital was established in 1923 as Bete Sayida (Teferi Mekonnen) Hospital. In 1937, the hospital renamed as Yekatit 12 to commemorate victims of the 1937 massacre by Italian fascist troops. In 2011, the hospital shifted to becoming a specialized medical college and research center, operating with 456 beds and provides clinical and academical services.

Yekatit 12 Hospital Medical College is a medical institution that was founded in 1924.

== Notable deaths ==
- Dagnachew Worku – writer (1936–1994)
- Dr. Feven Tesfalem – second-year Obstetrics and Gynecology resident at Yekatit 12 Hospital Medical College (died 2022)
