= The Thirteenth Sun =

1973 novel by Daniachew Worku

- Author: Daniachew Worku
- Language: English
- Genre: Domestic Fiction
- Publisher: Heinemann
- Publication date: 1973
- Publication place: Ethiopia

The Thirteenth Sun is the only novel written in English by Ethiopian author Daniachew Worku. It was first published in 1973 as number 125 in Heinemann's African Writers Series.

== Plot ==
The novel's main protagonist is Goytom, a young radical, who accompanies his ageing father on a pilgrimage. Fitawrary Woldu, his nobleman father, holds traditional beliefs and travels to St Abbo's Shrine on Mount Zuqualla in the hope of finding a cure for his heart disease. Despite his frailty, he continues to assert his authority to the frustration of his son. Travelling with the party is Woynitu, the Fitawrary's daughter by a prostitute.

As they ascend the mountain they find a place to stay overnight with a peasant and his wife, who is also known as the 'conjure woman'. The Fitawrary arranges for the peasant's wife to perform a sacrifice on his behalf. The peasant rapes Woynitu later that night.

The party reach the shrine on their third day and the Fitawrary takes the Sacrament and acknowledges Woynitu as his daughter. Later that day they return to stay with the peasant and his wife. The Fitawrary shoots his gun at the door, killing the peasant standing outside. He then falls back and dies.

The party wait two days for the police to arrive, but when they fail to show up Goytom leads them back down the mountain.

== Characters ==
- Goytom, the protagonist, a young radical
- Woynitu, Goytom's step sister
- Fitawrary Woldu, their father, an aging nobleman

== Background ==
The title of the book refers to the fact that Ethiopia has 13 lunar months.

The manuscript was received by James Currey of the African Writers Series in 1972. An early reader, Ros de Lanerolle, noted that the story was a mechanism to "expose decaying society, politically brutal, static and uncaring, corrupt and privilege-ridden. Its main strength is in its evocation of atmosphere, the beauty of the country in contrast to the decaying society and religion". This view was challenged by the author, who responded: "I do not agree with the reader's view that Ethiopia represents a totally decaying society. It may be true that she is stagnant. But not putrid."

It is clear, however, that the novel can be understood in the context of mid-twentieth century Ethiopia in the years before the revolution. Wren concludes: "Young Goytom’s horrible journey with the decaying corpse of Ethiopia’s past, naturalistic as it seems, is the final symbolism of the novel. However Haile Selassie’s rule was to end, it would be some such descent from the volcano. The Fitawrary’s last days exposed the massive contradictions in modern Ethiopia: a past that cannot be left behind and a present that has not been prepared for."

Its release in Ethiopia was disrupted amid concerns that it would be censored by the government of Haile Selassie, with small numbers reportedly sold under the counter of the United Nations bookshop in Addis Ababa. In 1974 the first demonstrations of what would become the Ethiopian Revolution created an opportunity for a wider release, and Heinemann took the opportunity to import additional copies.

== Literary significance and reception ==
The novel has been called one of the most extraordinary to appear in the African Writers Series.

In an early review, Payne concludes: "Worku's novel is hampered by an apparent unfamiliarity with English as an expressive medium and almost completely fails, with a few noteworthy exceptions, on an emotional (passionate?) level".

J. Roger Kurtz summarized The novel The Thirteenth Sun as pilgrimage narrative with a father-son conflict at its core, offering a complex and loosely allegorical depiction of a conflicted Ethiopian society at the close of Haile Selassie's reign. Daniachew was already well known for his Amharic writing when he published The Thirteenth Sun in English, in Heinemann's African Writers Series (AWS) in 1973. Drawing on a range of contextual information including records from the AWS and from the University of Iowa's International Writing Program (IWP), this essay invites a reconsideration of this important Ethiopian text. Despite the ubiquitous decadence and violence of the narrative, the essay asserts that reconciliation emerges as a dominant theme, and that the novel thus offers a noteworthy instance of a writer's moral imagination at work at a time of conflicted transition. Ginger Payne perceived the novel as a structurally intricate work. Worku uses the conflict between an aging, dying nobleman and his son to explore the whole range of difference of opinions plaguing modern Ethiopia and modern man: age and youth, progress and pastoral purity, spirituality and material wealth, mysticism and realism. The characters in the novel seemed to be one-dimensional. The father is portrayed as a shallow selfish man with an unconvincing faith in a peculiar mixture of magic and Christian ritual Goytom, his son, is described as an unsympathetic youth who recognizes his fathers hypocrisy without seeing his own.
