= Arba Minch General Hospital =

Public hospital in Arba Minch, South Ethiopia Regional State, Ethiopia

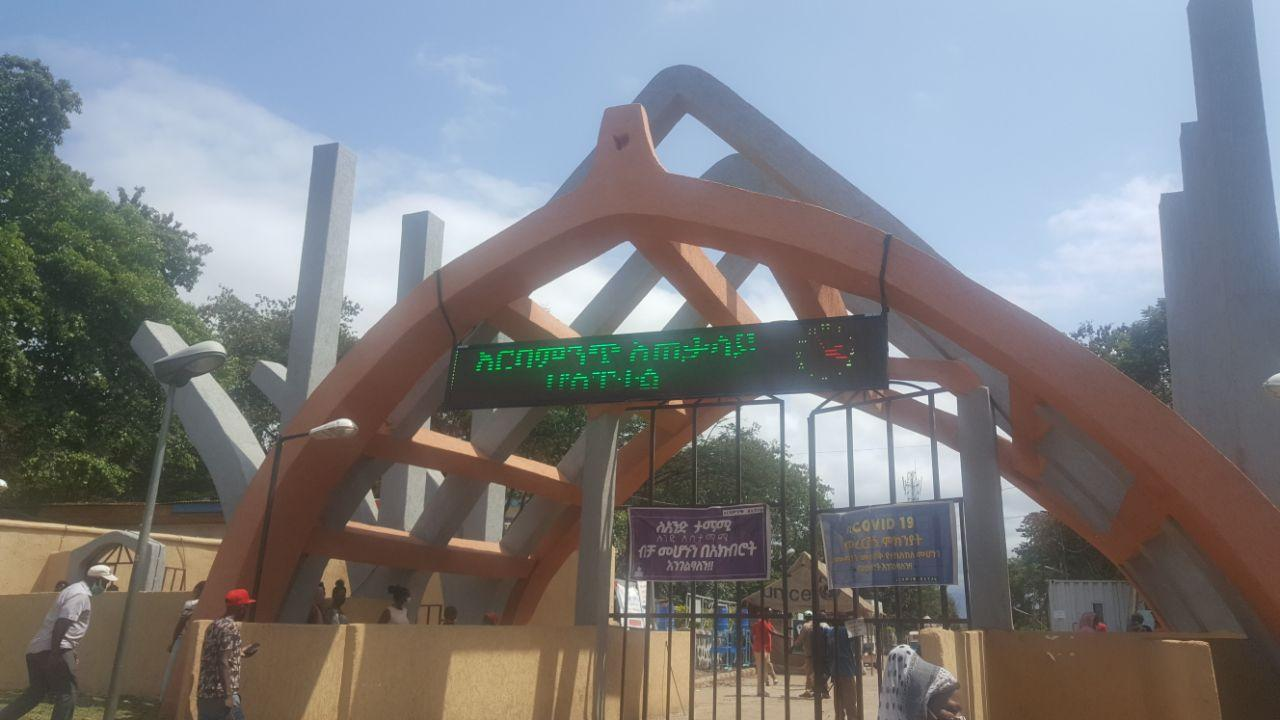
- Gate of Arba Minch General Hospital

Geography
- Location: Arba Minch, Gamo Zone, South Ethiopia, Ethiopia
- Coordinates: 6°01′41.6″N 37°33′08.1″E

Organisation
- Type: General hospital
- Affiliated university: Arba Minch University

Services
- Beds: 200

History
- Construction started: 1968
- Opened: 1965

Links
- Lists: Hospitals in Ethiopia

Arba Minch General Hospital is a public hospital located in Arba Minch town, Ethiopia. It is one of the general hospitals in the South Ethiopian region of Gamo Zone. It has a bed capacity for 200 patients.

== History ==
His Majesty Emperor Haile Selassie founded Arba Minch Hospital on December 7, 1961, Ethiopian calendar. The then Governor Dejazmach Aemro Selassie Abebe selected a suitable place for construction of the hospital to serve the population from the two sub-cities. The Ethiopian Ministry of Health, Angelina Roberto and Kebede Mulat General Contractors made a contractual agreement to build the hospital. The Ministry of Health requested the Norwegian Lutheran Mission (NLM) to manage the hospital after the establishment. Accordingly, the hospital started its work in 1965 with two Medical doctors, three Nurses and nine health assistants. The first medical doctor of the hospital was the Icelandic national called Dr Johannes Olafsson, who worked in Ethiopia from 1960 to 1980. Arba Minch hospital has introduced the first sonography machine in 1977, which was also the first for the country. The machine was introduced by a Norwegian medical doctor named Torvid Kiserude, who has worked in Arba Minch hospital for 8 years. The NLM's role in managing the hospital was over in 1990 when the Ethiopian nationals replaced the foreigners. Since then, the focus of the NLM changed to training medical specialists in the treatment of HIV/AIDS, construction of training centres and provision of medical equipment. In 1991 the mission helped in the establishment of intravenous fluid production centre.

Arba Minch General Hospital is the only hospital serving a population of 200,747 people per year in Gamo and other nearby zones. According to an Ethiopian health system model, a general hospital should serve 1-1.5 million population with an average of 234 staffs. Even though it is named as a general hospital it is functioning as a referral hospital with the number of staffs and several services it is providing.

== Departments/ services ==
The hospital has over 200 beds (7,11) with a total of 410 workers. Among these, 251 are health professionals, and 159 are administrative staffs. The hospital provides preventive, curative and rehabilitative services for Gamo and nearby zones.

== Collaborations ==
The hospital has been collaborating with local and international organizations.

In the early days, the hospital collaborated with the Catholic mission and the Gamo-Gofa Province women's association on the construction of the "Mothers' Village". This was a place where mothers coming from different woreda (district) and awrajas (Zones) stay and get treatment for 1 birr per day until they deliver their baby. The village was completed in 1979, began functioning in 1980 and transferred to the hospital from women's association in 1983.

In addition, the Norwegian Lutheran Mission (NLM) has been involved in the construction of wards since 1979. The wards built by the NLM include Medical ward (E ward) having 14 beds. They also added the ward for mothers and children (C ward). Then, they built the children's ward in 1985. The NLM also built a water tank to alleviate the water shortage problem in 1982. Due to this project, there is an uninterrupted water supply in the hospital until now. Another Norwegian organization, called Ethiopia Fund , was involved in the expansion of maternity service. This project was managed by Professor Bernt Lindtjørn, a Norwegian medical doctor from NLM. The maternity unit has a capacity of 80 beds for prenatal, postnatal, delivery services and to treat fistula patients. The hospital also collaborates with a local non-governmental rehabilitation centre which employs 240 minimally trained community health workers whose main duty is to bring disabled patients to the centre

The organization known as CBM (Christoffel-Blindenmission) was supporting the eye clinic since 1977. CBM in association with Ethiopian Lion's club also built another building for the eye clinic. An integrated laboratory and outpatient department was built in February 2012 by the President's Emergency Plan for AIDS Relief (PEPFAR).

A recent collaboration was made between a European non-governmental organization called DNDi (Drug for Neglected Diseases initiative), Addis Ababa University, the Ministry of Health and Arabaminch hospital to establish Leishmaniasis examination and treatment centre. This project was funded by the Swiss foundation. There was also a project grant obtained from UNICEF and Irish Aid for the establishment of neonatal clinic and capacity building for the staff.

The hospital has been working in collaboration with Arba Minch University. It serves as a place of practice for students of the college of medicine and health sciences. The medical interns, general practitioners and specialists employed by the university also work in the hospital and serve the community.

== Research ==
There are numerous researches conducted with different themes in Arba Minch hospital over the years. These research findings have been giving important information for local and national policymakers. They also serve as a reference for similar research undertakings elsewhere. Few of the studies are described below.

=== Maternal and Child Health (MCH) ===
Some of the researches that have been done in Arbaminch Hospital targeting children include assessment of neonatal and child mortality and diarrheal diseases. Studies that aim to assess pregnancy-related conditions and diseases were among maternal health-related researches.

=== HIV and other Infectious diseases ===
The support of the NLM on HIV/AIDS made it possible to conduct various studies on HIV patients, treatment and co-morbidities in Arba Minch Hospital.

Studies that implicate survival with Anti-retroviral Therapies (ART) and cost-effectiveness analysis of the treatment were done. Other researches focusing on the prevalence of different diseases or opportunistic infections and nutritional status of HIV patients were also studied. There was also a multi-centre study that assessed if an intervention (deworming) improves the immune status of HIV patients.

=== Non-communicable diseases and drug resistance ===
A prevalence study was done on diabetic patients who have a follow-up in the hospital. In addition to an assessment of drug use pattern of patients several drug resistance studies on different pathogens were done on inpatient and outpatient clients.
