= Zewditu Hospital =

Public hospital in Addis Ababa, Ethiopia

- Ministry of Health

Geography
- Location: Taitu St, Addis Ababa, Ethiopia
- Coordinates: 9°1′6″N 38°45′22″E

Organisation
- Type: Public

History
- Opened: 1976

Zewditu Hospital is a public hospital in central Addis Ababa, Ethiopia. It was built, owned and operated by the Seventh-day Adventist Church, but was nationalized during the Derg regime in about 1976. The hospital is named after Empress Zewditu, the cousin and predecessor on the throne of Emperor Haile Selassie. Today, Zewditu Hospital is operated by the Ministry of Health.

== Overview ==
Zewditu Hospital is Ethiopia's leading hospital in the treatment of ART patients and currently treats over 6,000 each month. CDC-Ethiopia helped launch Ethiopia's first ART program at Zewditu in July 2003, and in March 2005 it received technical assistance from Johns Hopkins University’s (JHU) TSEHAI Program. Zewditu became the largest HIV clinic in Ethiopia, with 14,000 patients in its care. Since, ART programs have been initiated in other hospitals around the country, relieving pressure on the hospital.

The hospital also deals with palliative care, HIV counseling and testing, STI services and Post-exposure prophylaxis (PEP) services.

The hospital was temporarily closed down in 2007 after a serious leakage was found in the building.
