= Menelik II Referral Hospital =

Public hospital in Addis Ababa, Ethiopia

Geography
- Location: Russia St., Addis Ababa, Ethiopia
- Coordinates: 9.038484531872488°N 38.774286366741364°E

Organisation
- Care system: Specialty
- Type: Public

Services
- Beds: over 800

History
- Constructed: 1906
- Opened: 1909

Menelik II Referral Hospital (Amharic: ዳግማዊ ምኒልክ ሪፈራል ሆስፒታል) is a public health care hospital in Addis Ababa, and is one of the oldest hospitals in Ethiopia. Named after Emperor Menelik II, it was established in 1909, serving as a tertiary care hospital that provides with specialized services in the country. It is located near Jan Meda on Russia St.

== Background and services ==
Menelik II Referral Hospital was established in 1909 and named after Emperor Menelik II, becoming one of oldest modern hospitals in Ethiopia. Built in 1908, it initially had only 30 beds. It is a tertiary care hospital with specialized provision with capacity over 800 beds and offering specialties of some sorts: cardiology, neurology, oncology and other fields. It is administered by Addis Ababa City Administration.

The hospital now hosts around 15,000 patients each day with over 2,300 staffs. On 30 May 2022, Prime Minister Abiy Ahmed along with Mayor of Addis Ababa Adanech Abiebie inaugurated a dialysis center at the hospital.
