= Women's health in Ethiopia =

Women's health in Ethiopia can be broken down into several sections: general health status, women's status, maternal health, HIV, harmful traditional practices, and violence against women.

== Background ==
Ethiopia is the oldest independent and second most-populous country in Africa. A projection from the 2007 census, it has a total of 90 million inhabitants in 2015 (CSA 2015).

The sex ratio between male and female is almost equal; women in the reproductive age group constitute 23.4% of the population. The total fertility rate declined from 5.5 in 2000 to 4.1 in 2014.

== General health status in Ethiopia ==
The average life expectancy for an Ethiopian has increased from 45 years in 1990 to 64 years in 2014, which is higher than the African average (58 years) but lower than the global average of 70 years. This makes Ethiopia one of the six countries that made top individual gains since 1990. The achievement is attributed to the dramatic drop in the under five mortality (U5MR) and an improvement in other socio-economic determinants of health. The U5MR has dropped from 204/1000 live births in 1990 to 64/1000 live births in 2013, the target for achieving MDG4 being 67/1000 live births. Thus Ethiopian has achieved the MDG 4 by the year 2013 well ahead of the proposed time for 2015.

== Women's status in Ethiopia ==
In Ethiopia, women of reproductive age constitute about a quarter of the entire population of 90 million. Around 80% of the labor force is engaged in agriculture, and 84% live in rural parts of the country. Poverty is multidimensional, and its impact is different on men and women. 43% of rural women aged 10 years and above are economically active, mostly in agriculture.

- Women in Ethiopia highly contribute for the development of livestock production. But they have very little control on the income. According to the federal civil service commission report in 2005, only 33% of the civil servants were women and 98.2% of women employees were working in lower position. At federal level only 13% of the women were at professional level. In the Informal sector, however, 64.93% are women concentrated in a low paying job.
- Women in Ethiopia are engaged with the triple role of production, reproduction and household duties. On an average a rural woman will spend 15 – 18 hours a day on agricultural and domestic activities.
- Eleven percent of women are married to a man with more than one wife and Sixty-three percent of women in Ethiopia are married by age 18, compared with just 14% of men
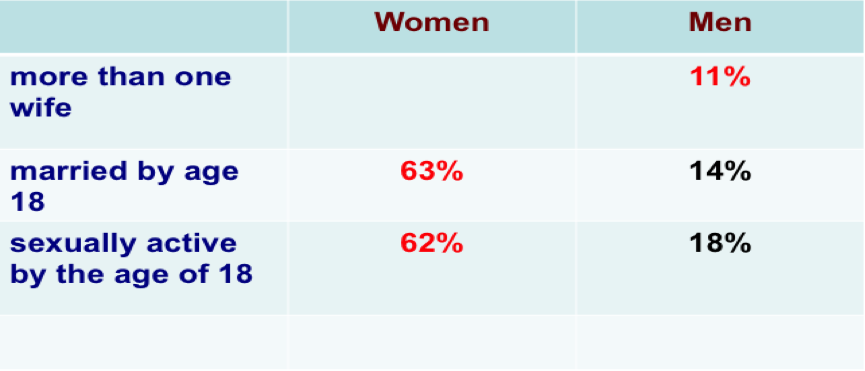
  Gender difference on age at first sex
  • 62% women and 18% of men age 25-49 were sexually active by the age of 18, i.e., Women start sexual activity about four and a half years earlier than men (median age of 16.6 years for women and 21.2 years for men)

== Maternal health ==
Good progress has been registered in maternal mortality reduction, a 69% reduction according to UN estimates from the 1400/100000 live births in 1990 to 420/100,000 live births in 2013.

Maternal wellbeing is crucial for the nations development. Majority of maternal deaths occur in the peripartum period. Deliveries attended by a skilled health care provider were shown to improve both maternal and neonatal survival. In Ethiopian most of the deliveries occur at home and unattended by skilled provider

Obstetric fistulas remains a leading health concern for women throughout Ethiopia.The ending of obstetric fistulas has been named as a Sustainable development need for Ethiopia and a plan is in place with an achievement goal of 2030. It has been found that by furthering the age of first pregnancy, can play a major role in limiting the occurrence of fistulas. Child marriage is a prevalent practice, most commonly in South Asia and Sub Saharan Africa. In Ethiopia, child marriage which is identified as anyone under the age of 18, exists at a rate of 40.3 percent as of 2016. The prevalence of this practice increases the chances of exposure to sexual abuse, partner violence, and lessens exposure to educational and economic opportunities. The concern for obstetric fistulas exceeds its medical ramifications, but is also identified in increased ostracization of those with fistulas due to its social stigma.

The main contributing risk factor for obstetric fistulas remains lack of awareness of fistulas and how to treat them. Amongst other risk factors including no skilled birth attendants, poor health-seeking behavior, poor referral system and transportation network, age and physical maturity, iatrogenic surgical damage, Educational status, sexual violence, poverty, and having child births too close together.

Obstetric fistulas if left untreated risk life long morbidity as well as possible psychological, social, and economic consequences. Currently the Hamlin Fistula Organization has five hospitals throughout Ethiopia and employs over 500 Ethiopians.

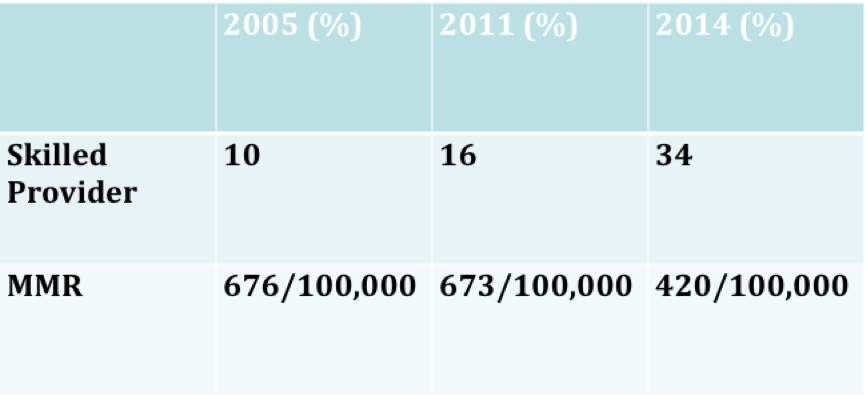
Skilled birth attendance and Maternal Mortality trend in Ethiopia

== Women and HIV ==
HIV Sero – prevalence in adults aged between 15–49 years in Ethiopia is estimated at 1.5% [5.5% urban, 0.7% rural]. However, the prevalence in women is about double than the prevalence in men, 1.9% versus 1%, respectively.

== Harmful traditional practices ==
Seventy four percent of women had a FGM out of which, 6% have their vaginas sewn closed. Around 8% of all marriages occur after through abduction.

== Violence against women ==
The most common forms of violence against women in Ethiopia include physical violence (intimate partner violence) and sexual violence. A study done in Kofele, (Oromia region, Arsi, Ethiopia) in 2004 showed the lifetime and the 12 months prevalence of physical violence among married women was 64% and 55%, respectively. Another study performed in North-west Ethiopia (Dabat High school) in 2005 revealed that sexual harassment was seen in 44% of the students and rape was experienced by 33.3% of sexually active students.

At the tertiary level of education the sexual violence was also alarmingly high as this was also confirmed by a study conducted at Addis Ababa University in 2004 on more than 600 students, where sexual harassment was experienced by 58% in life time and 41.8% in the last one year, rape was experienced by 12.7% of the students, and 27.5% of the student had escaped an attempted rape.

== See also ==
- Women in Ethiopia
