= Maternal health in Ethiopia =

Maternal death is defined by the World Health Organization as "the death of a woman while pregnant or within 42 days of termination of pregnancy, irrespective of the duration and the site of the pregnancy, from any cause related to or aggravated by the pregnancy or its management, but not from accidental or incidental causes". While improvements in maternal health in Ethiopia have been attested between 1990 and 2015, maternal death remains 'unacceptably high'. In 2025, Ethiopia'smaternal mortality ratio (MMR) was estimated at 366.6 maternal deaths per 100,000 live births.

Health in Ethiopia has improved from the last decades to then through the major achievement in areas of health service delivery by making health system accessible, affordable and acceptable at different level for the beneficiaries and put different efforts to provide quality health services care. The improvement in infrastructure, resource mobilization and leadership and governance in health sector and in the country as a whole have a key contribution for the achievements. Maternal health is one of the area where an attention given and different efforts and initiatives were being implemented with strong political will and commitment

== Issues ==
=== Medical factors ===
The most common causes of maternal death in Ethiopia include postpartum bleeding, obstructed labour, pre-eclampsia, and eclampsia.

Inconsistency in reported figures stems from two main issues: a low sample size; and an overrepresentation of data from hospitals and health centers, rather than home births.

=== Delayed treatment of complications ===
The three-delay model describes three sets of factors affecting outcomes:

1. Factors that delay the decision to seek care;
2. Factors that delay arrival at a healthcare facility;
3. Factors that delay provision of adequate care.

==== Emergency readiness ====
Access to emergency obstetric care has a positive effect on outcomes during pregnancy, delivery, and the postnatal period. Causes of maternal mortality, such as postpartum bleeding, are exacerbated by a lack of access to emergency obstetric care.

=== Social factors ===
==== Access to healthcare ====
Significant regional disparities have been attested. Antenatal healthcare increases with education and wealth.

== Measuring maternal health ==
The WHO recommends assessing improvements in maternal and neonatal health with 15 process indicators. Relevant indicators include the Maternal Mortality Ratio (MMR), antenatal care coverage, skilled birth attendance, postnatal care, and unmet family planning needs.

=== Ethiopian Demographic and Health Survey (EDHS) ===
Indicator	EDHS 2000	EDHS 2005	EDHS 2011	Ethiopian Mini Demographic and Health Survey 2014
Maternal Mortality Ratio	891	673	676	
Contraceptive Prevalence Rate	8.1	14.7	28.6	41.8
Total Fertility Rate	5.9	5.4	4.8	4.1
Antenatal Care	27	28	34	41
Birth attended by skilled staff	5.6	5.7	10	14.5
Unmet need for Family Planning	35	33.5	25.3	

In 2013, the WHO introduced the Maternal Death Surveillance and Response system, aiming to improve the quality of global health provision.

=== Maternal health trends in Ethiopia (1950-2015) ===
Evidences regarding maternal health condition in Ethiopia are available starting from 1990. According to the target set for tracking of annual reduction of maternal mortality Ethiopia is categorized under counties who are making progress to achieve the target set for MDG5 by United Nation.

According to the World Health Organization (WHO) estimation maternal death decreased from 523,000 in 1990 to 289,000 in 2013 globally which accounts for 45% reduction. It was reduced from 990,000 to 510,000 for Sub-Saharan countries in the same year of interval with 49% reduction. In this report, maternal death in Ethiopia reduced from 43,300 to 13,000 from 1990 to 2013 indicating a reduction by 38% and with 4% contribution to the overall global maternal death. These figures indicate that reduction in maternal death in Ethiopia is below the average for Sub-Saharan countries or the globe, despite the attested improvements.

Moreover, Ethiopia has not achieved the set MDG target for MMR. Having a goal and target initiates to put more efforts to identify barriers to quality maternal health services and address at all level of the health system or achievement of SDG. In order to meet the SDG target, Ethiopia has developed a five-year plan from the 2015/16 to 2019/20 to reduce maternal mortality ratio from 420 per 100,000s live birth to 199 per 100,000 live births. Similarly there are plans for the improvement of maternal health services in the same time duration.

== Prevention of maternal mortality ==
In 1990, the Millennium Development Goals were adopted, including goal 5: reducing the global MMR by 75%. In 2015, the UN reported that Ethiopia was on track to achieve this target. However, a report by the World Bank found that socioeconomic inequality was still prevalent in maternal healthcare.

In 2015, the United Nations adopted 17 Sustainable Development Goals to be implemented by 2030, including Sustainable Development Goal 3, focusing on health and wellbeing. Target 3.1 is to achieve a reduction of global maternal mortality ratio of less than 70 per 100,000 live births.

=== Health Sector Development Program (HSDP) ===
Following adoption of the Millennium Development Goals, Ethiopia announced the Health Sector Development Program (HSDP), aiming to improve the provision of primary healthcare services to mothers and children; prevent and control communicable diseases; and improve monitoring and evaluation of health services. The HSDP was implemented in four stages, as follows:

- HDSP-I (1997-2002)
- HDSP-II (2002-2005)
- HDSP-III (2005-2010)
- HDSP-IV (2012-2015)

==== Increasing healthcare provision ====
A 2011 report found a total of 1379 midwives, 192 obstetricians, and 31831 'community health workers with some midwifery training'.

==== Community outreach ====
Access to contraception; increasing women's decision-making power

== Maternal health situation in Ethiopia ==
According to Health Sector Development Plan IV (HSDP IV), which was being implemented from 2012 to 2015, the performance evaluation of 2013/14 indicated progress in achievement of family planning service coverage, antenatal care service coverage, institutional delivery and postnatal service coverage. Furthermore, access to emergency obstetric care in the reduction of maternal death during pregnancy and child birth through provision of Basic and Comprehensive Emergency Obstetric Care are the areas where special attention has been given and improvements have been observed.

The number of health centres and hospitals providing Basic Emergency Obstetric Care (BEmOC) and Comprehensive Emergency Obstetric Care (CEmOBC) has been increasing over time (Figure 1). There are 25 functional regional blood banks with 30 satellite mobile teams who are collecting the blood from the communities on a daily basis. The blood banks are located within 150 –200 km radius of their catchment are where both private and public health facilities are able to get safe blood

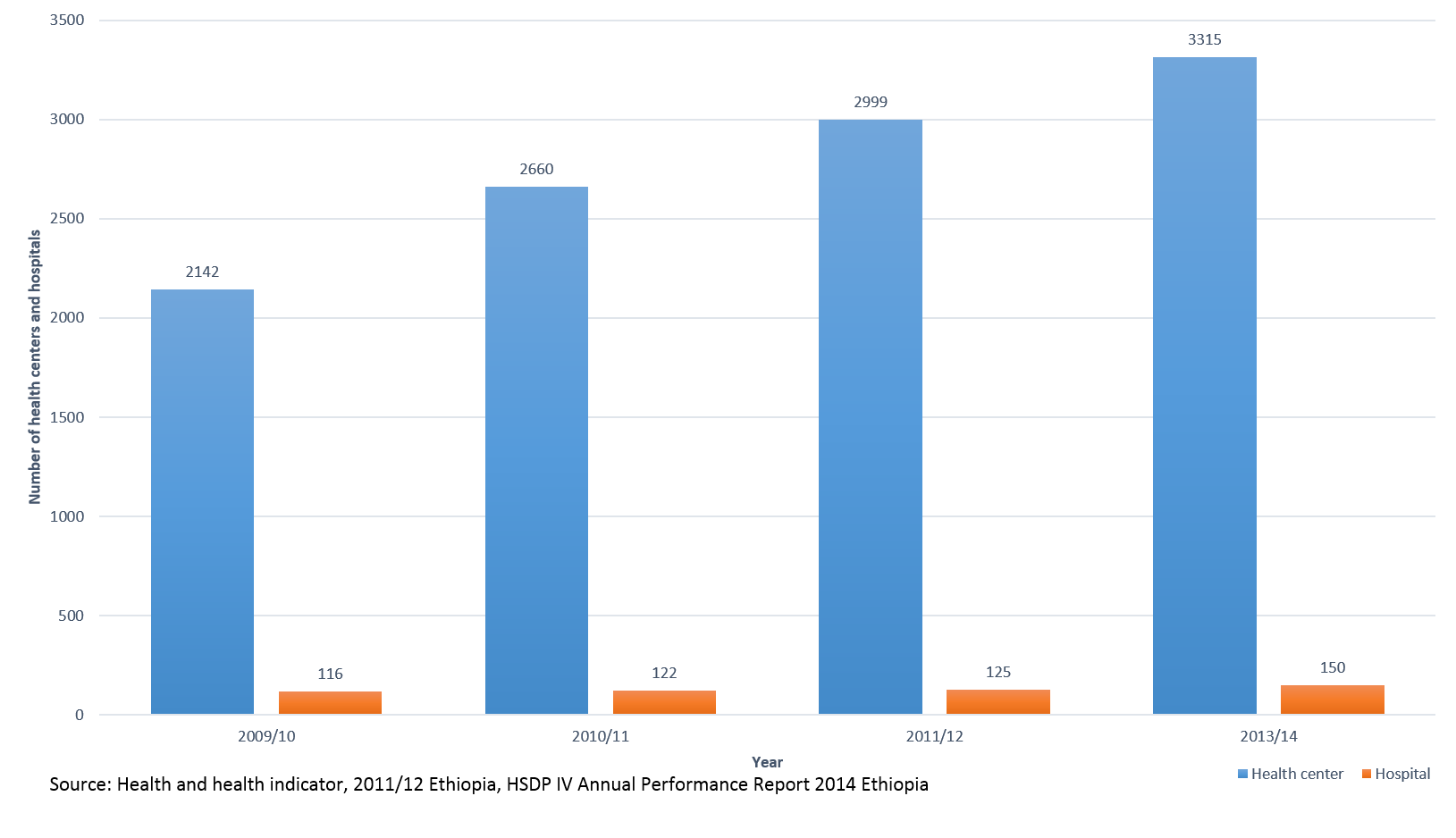
Number of health centers and hospitals in Ethiopia

=== Human resource ===
Maternal health services are provided at all three levels of health sector structure: Primary, secondary and tertiary level. At community level it is provided by Health Extension workers focusing on preventive services and promotion of skilled birth attendant. It is supported by community networking and ownership called Health Development Army that improve community ownership and further enable the community to produce and maintain its own health. At this level the major service provided are community mobilization, and awareness creation with some service provision such as contraceptives.
