= Ministry of Health (Ethiopia) =

Government ministry of Ethiopia

- ጤና ሚኒስቴር
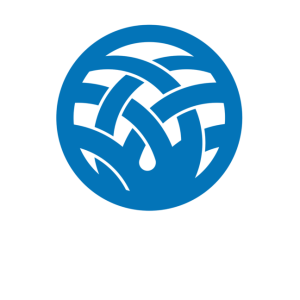

Agency overview
- Formed: 1948
- Jurisdiction: Ethiopian government
- Headquarters: Sudan St, Addis Ababa, Ethiopia; 9.016379°N 38.746772°E
- Agency executive: Mekdes Daba
- Parent department: Prime Minister Office
- Website: https://moh.gov.et

The Ministry of Health (MoH) (Amharic: ጤና ሚኒስቴር) is the Ethiopian government department responsible for public health concerns. Its head office is on Sudan Street in Addis Ababa.

Mekdes Daba has been the head of the ministry since February 2024. The organization is a cabinet level organization which has authority over the Public Health Institute.

== History ==
The Ministry of Public Health was created in 1948 followed by Proclamation issued in 1946. The Public Health Administration shortly transferred to the Ministry of Public Health.

In recent years, the ministry promotes family planning programs introduced contraceptives, giving women a choice over their sexual and reproductive health while combatting child marriage and harmful practice in Ethiopia.

== Ministers ==
- Adanech Kidanemariam (1991– 1994)
- Tedros Adhanom (2005–2012)
- Dr. kesetebirhan Admasu (2012–2016)
- professor Yifru Berhan Mitke (2016–2018)
- Dr Amir Aman (2018–2020)
- Lia Tadesse (2020–2024)
- Mekdes Daba (2024–present)
