= Kingdom of Gumma =

Kingdom in Gibe region of Ethiopian Empire between 18th century to 1902

Coordinates: 8°12′58″N 36°37′41″E

- c. 1770–1902
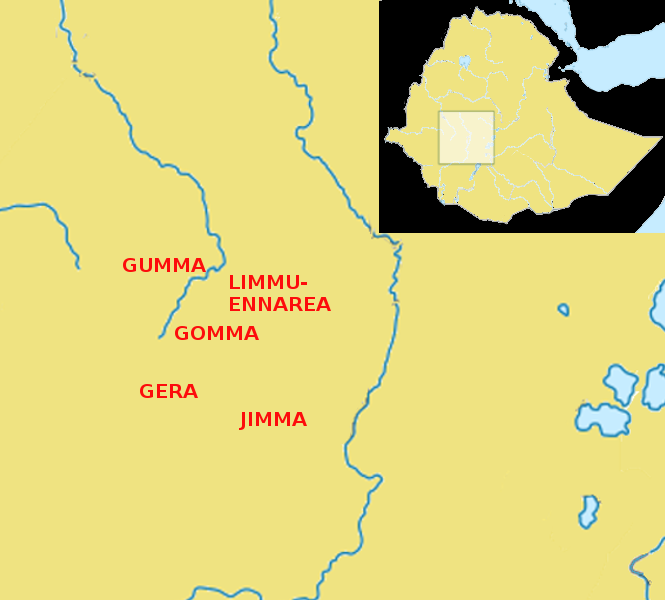
- The five Oromo kingdoms of the Gibe region
- Status: Part of Ethiopian Empire (1885-1899)
- Religion: Sunni Islam
- Government: Monarchy
- History
  - Established: c. 1770
  - Separatist Government: 1899–1902
  - Annexed by Ethiopian Empire: 1902
Succeeded by
Ethiopian Empire
- Today part of: Ethiopia

The Kingdom of Gumma was a kingdom in the Gibe region of Ethiopia that emerged in the 18th century. Its eastern border was formed by the bend of the Didessa River, which separated it from (proceeding downstream to upstream) Limmu-Ennarea to the northeast, and the kingdoms of Gomma and Gera to the south. Beyond its northern border were various Macha Oromo groups, and to the west Sidamo groups. Its territory corresponds approximately with the modern woredas of Gechi, Borecha, and Didessa.

This former kingdom was mostly located on a plateau with an average elevation of 6500 feet, and had a population estimated in 1880 of about 50,000. Its inhabitants had a reputation as warriors. Beckingham and Huntingford considered Gumma, along with Gomma, was the least economically developed of the Gibe kingdoms; however Mohamed Hassen notes that, with the exception of the northern and western boundaries where constant raiding by her neighbors, the Arjo in the north and the Nonno in the west, forced those living in those parts to embrace pastoralism, the land was intensively farmed and grew many of the same crops as the other Gibe kingdoms -- sorghum, wheat, barley and cotton, except for coffee.

== History ==
According to the reigning Gomma dynasty, they descended from a sheikh who came from Mogadishu. They tied their recent origin to a man called Adam. Around 1770, he came to live in the area, and is said to have then helped in the deposition of the last king of the previous dynasty, Sarborada. The historian Mohammed Hassen, in discussing this tradition, suggests this tradition about Adam "was invented so as to Islamize the original founder of the dynasty."

King Jawe was converted to Islam by merchants from Shewa and Begemder, and in turn he imposed his religious faith upon his subjects.

In 1882, King Abba Jubir of Gumma convinced the kings of Ennerea, Gomma and Jimma to form a confederacy known as the "Muslim League", to counter the threat from some of the Macha Oromo, who in turn formed their own alliance, the "League of the Four Oromo". At first the Muslim League had little success against this threat, for the other members did not support Abba Jubir against the Macha, until his elder brother Abba Digir was captured. At this point the people of Ennerea came to their help, but even with this help Abba Jubir had no more success and was forced to negotiate an armistice with the Macha for the safe release of his brother. Abba Jubir then went to war against Jimma, and sacked its capital, despite Gomma and Limmu-Enerea coming to the aid of Jimma.

Despite the failure of the Muslim League, Gumma remained a stronghold of Islam, and provided asylum to men exiled from the other Gibe kingdoms. It was conquered by Emperor Menelik II in 1885, but the kingdom remained a "hotbed of rebellion and Muslim fanaticism against alien colonial administration." Firisa, son of the last king, had found sanctuary in the Sudan after the conquest, and returned in 1899 to declare a jihad against the conquerors. Firisa was eventually captured in 1902, then executed in Jimma soon afterwards.

== See also ==
- Ethiopian Empire
- Rulers of the Gibe State of Guma
- List of Sunni Muslim dynasties
