= Lucie von Hardenberg =

German architect (1776–1854)

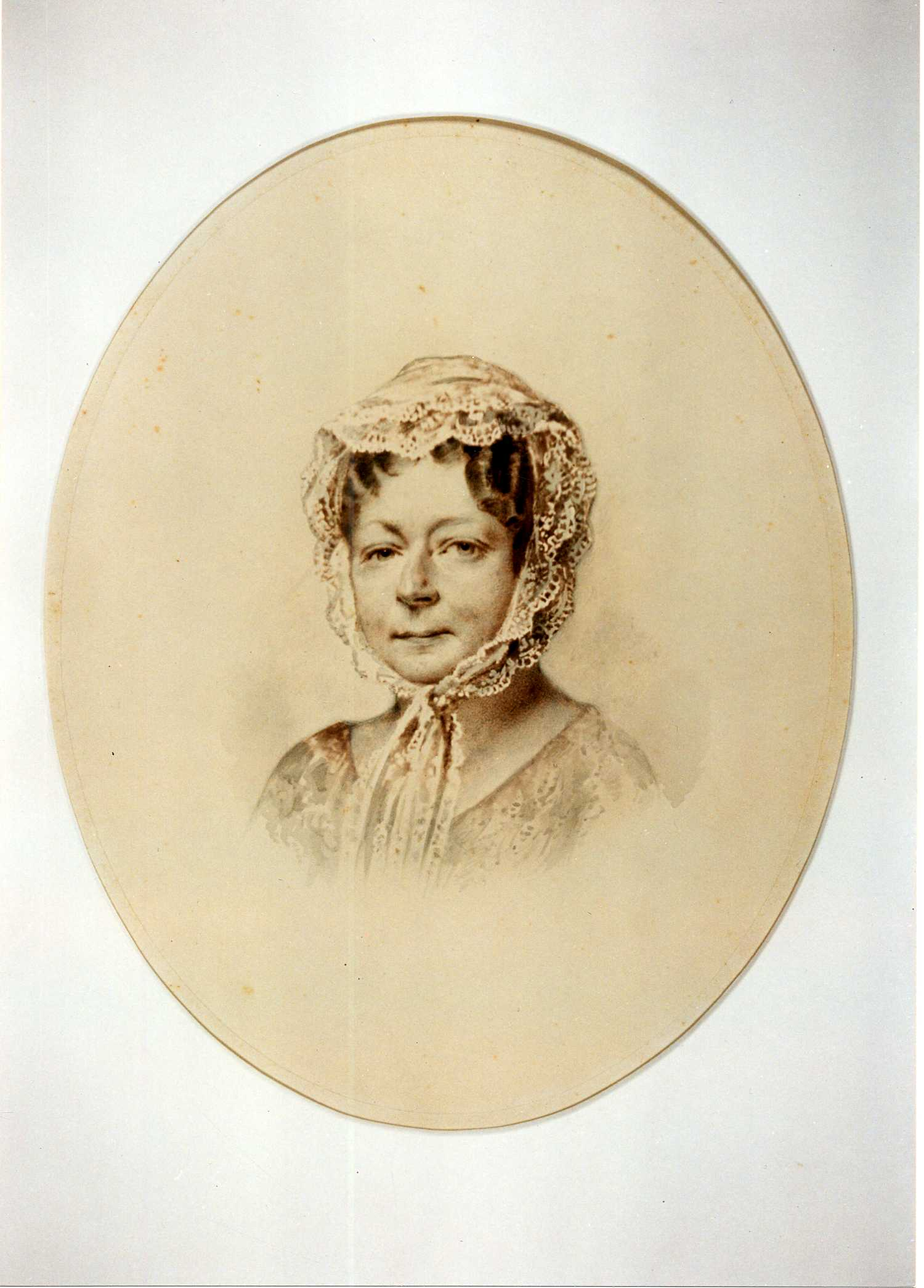
- Lucie, Princess of Pückler-Muskau, pictured, around 1853
- Born: 9 April 1776; Hanover
- Died: 8 May 1854 (aged 78); Branitz Palace
- Parent: Karl August von Hardenberg (father)

Lucia Anna Wilhelmine Christina, Countess von Hardenberg-Reventlow (9 April 1776 in Hanover – 8 May 1854 at Branitz Palace) was a German landscape architect. She was the daughter of the Royal Prussian State Chancellor and Prince Karl August von Hardenberg. Her first marriage was to Karl Theodor von Pappenheim and her second to Hermann von Pückler-Muskau. She devoted many years of her life to the creation of the Prince Pückler Park in Muskau and the Branitzer Park.

== Lucie von Hardenberg-Reventlow ==
Lucia Anna Wilhelmine Christina Countess von Hardenberg-Reventlow, called Lucie, was born on 9 April 1776 in Hanover. She was the second child of Karl August von Hardenberg, the later Royal Prussian State Chancellor, and his wife, Countess Christiane Friederike Juliane von Reventlow (1759–1793). Her brother, Christian Heinrich August von Hardenberg-Reventlow, was born in 1775. Her parents divorced in 1788. Initially, Lucie lived with one of her aunts, but in 1790 she moved in with her father, who was a minister in Ansbach and Bayreuth.

== Lucie von Pappenheim ==
On 26 June 1796, Lucie von Hardenberg-Reventlow married the Imperial Count Karl Theodor von Pappenheim, five years her senior. Two of their three children died in early childhood. They were survived by their daughter Adelheid von Carolath-Beuthen (3 March 1797 – 29 April 1849). The family was completed by their foster daughter Helmine, whose origins are unknown.

Lucie von Pappenheim separated from her husband in 1802. She received Dennenlohe Castle near Ansbach, where she lived with her daughters Adelheid and Helmine until 1817. Lucie von Pappenheim maintained friendships in Hamburg, Altona, and Berlin. During her stays in Berlin, she was a frequent guest at the literary and musical salon of Elisabeth von Staegemann. It was in this city that Lucie probably first met Hermann von Pückler-Muskau (30 October 1785 – 4 February 1871), who was nine years her junior. This began a relationship that was to last 37 years, until Lucie's death. In 1817, Lucie von Pappenheim divorced so she could marry Pückler.

== Lucie von Pückler-Muskau ==
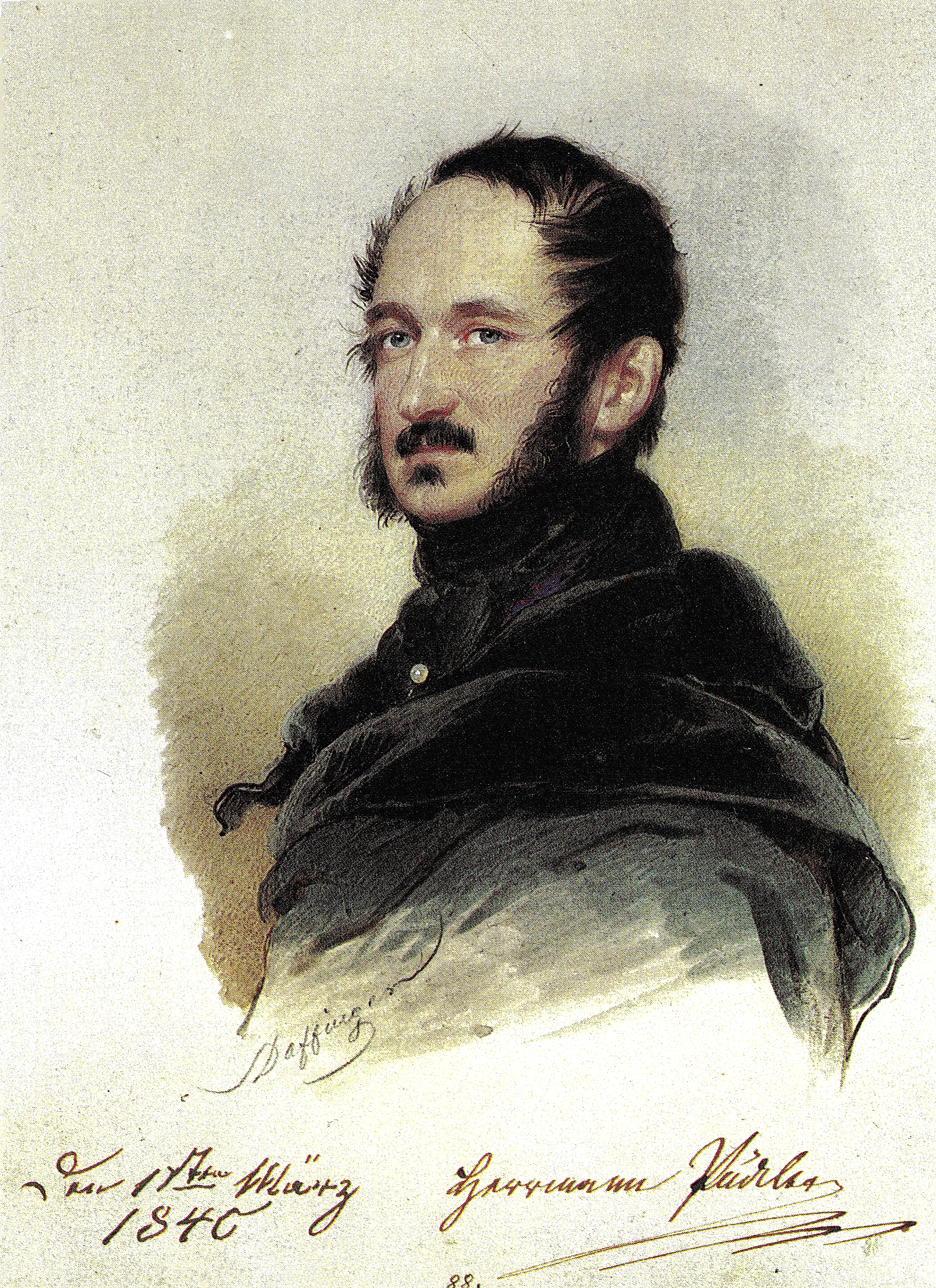
Hermann von Pückler-Muskau (1840), coloured pencil drawing by Moritz Daffinger

The engagement of Lucie von Pappenheim and Hermann von Pückler-Muskau took place on November 16, 1816, and their wedding took place on October 9, 1817. The two shared a sharp mind, a sense of humour, and common interests. The union was advantageous for both partners: Pückler was able to realize his dream of transforming his lands around the town of Muskau into a landscape garden with the help of Lucie's substantial dowry. Marriage to the owner of one of the largest estates in Upper Lusatia restored the divorced Lucie to a status commensurate with her origins. Hermann von Pückler and Lucie were elevated to the rank of prince in 1822.

Since their first meeting, the couple maintained a lively correspondence. A large number of Hermann von Pückler's letters have survived, but Lucie's have not. Whether she or Pückler wished that her letters to him, and even the accompanying copies, be destroyed cannot be determined in retrospect. Often, only from Pückler's replies to Lucie can we guess what she was telling him in her letters.

As early as 1820, Pückler considered selling the Muskau estate, as the fortune Lucie had brought with her had been exhausted. Lucie von Pückler made the unusual suggestion to her husband that they dissolve the marriage so that he could once again search for a wealthy wife. In February 1826, the marriage was dissolved. The official reason given was the couple's childlessness. Shortly before, in January 1826, Pückler had transferred the Pückler-Muskau estate to his wife in order to protect his property from possible seizure.

In September 1826, Pückler actually went to England to look for a bride. Since word of his intentions quickly spread, the search was unsuccessful and was even ridiculed in the English press. The prince nevertheless stayed in England for two years. During this time, he gained new inspiration for his park and wrote amusing letters about English society to his ex-wife. Lucie kept all the letters and prepared them for publication. After Pückler's return, the letters appeared in two volumes.

During Prince Pückler's several years of traveling to the Orient, Heinrich Laube was sentenced to seven years' imprisonment in a fortress. After a plea for clemency, this sentence was reduced to one and a half years. Through her father's contacts, Lucie von Pückler was able to arrange for Laube to serve his sentence in Muskau. There, he lived in the Old Palace and was even able to participate in hunting trips; among other things, he mentioned the Mühlrose Hunting Lodge Tiergarten in the Muskau Heath in his writings. After his imprisonment, he dedicated a publication to the Princess.

== The garden designer ==
=== Pückler-Muskau ===
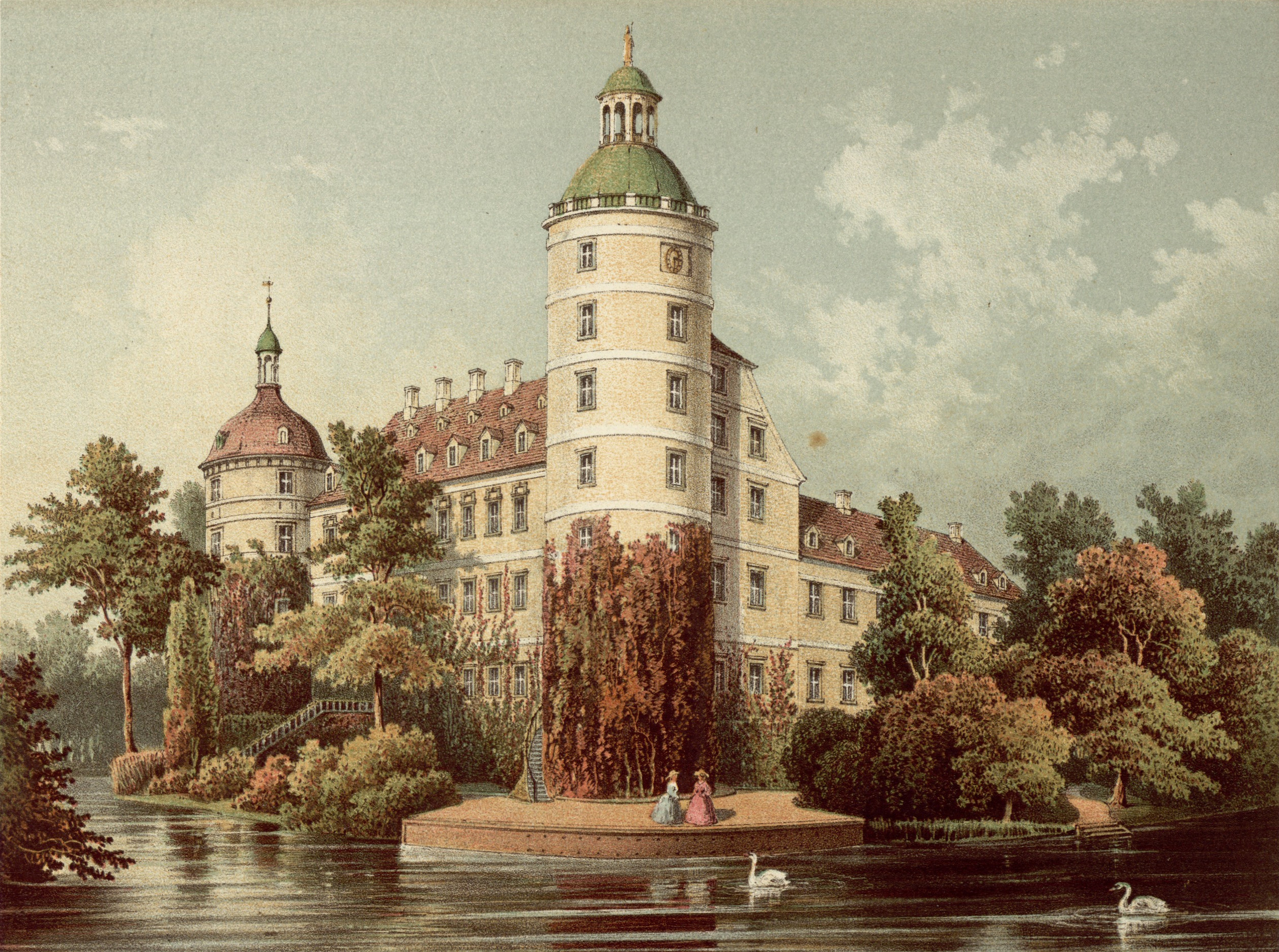
Muskau Castle at the time of Pückler

From his first trip to England (1814–1815), Hermann von Pückler had brought with him a passion for English-style landscape gardens. Immediately after his return, he began redesigning Muskau, his mother's inheritance. Even during their engagement, Lucie was infected by his enthusiasm and was prepared to donate a large part of her fortune to the design of the park. While Pückler was away traveling a lot, Lucie stayed on site and oversaw the design of the park. Even after the divorce, Lucie continued her life and work in Muskau. At Pückler's request, some parts of the park were named after her, for example Lake Lucie and the Schnuckental (after her nickname Schnucke). Lucie von Hardenberg was assisted by the short-statured Wilhelm Heinrich Masser.

In 1822, Lucie von Pückler had a spa built on the grounds of the park, which was inaugurated in 1823. The hoped-for income, which was urgently needed to finance the park, did not materialize despite intensive advertising for the mineral bath. Although Pückler's letters show that he and his wife created Muskau Park on an equal footing, this is not mentioned in his Hints on Landscape Gardening published in 1834. The extent of her contribution to the creation of the park can be easily estimated, since she continued the work even during Pückler's several years of travel. In 1834, Hermann von Pückler set out on his longest journey, which took him to Egypt and Greece, among other places. He did not return until 1840. A few years later, the sale of the Muskau estate, including the palace and park, became unavoidable due to the great financial difficulties. It found a new owner in 1845.

=== Branitz ===
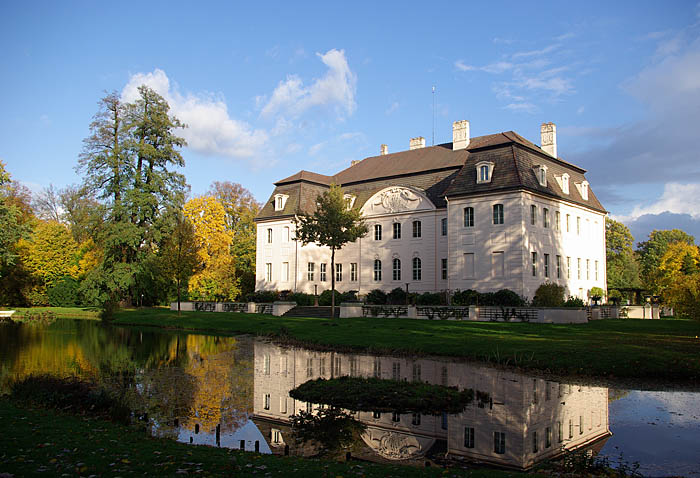
Branitz Palace (in 2008)

Hermann von Pückler's paternal family seat was located in Branitz. After selling the estate, Lucie and Hermann von Pückler made Branitz Castle their new home. Lucie initially oversaw the construction of the castle and began planning the Branitz Park, but with increasing age, she became increasingly withdrawn.

== Last years of life ==
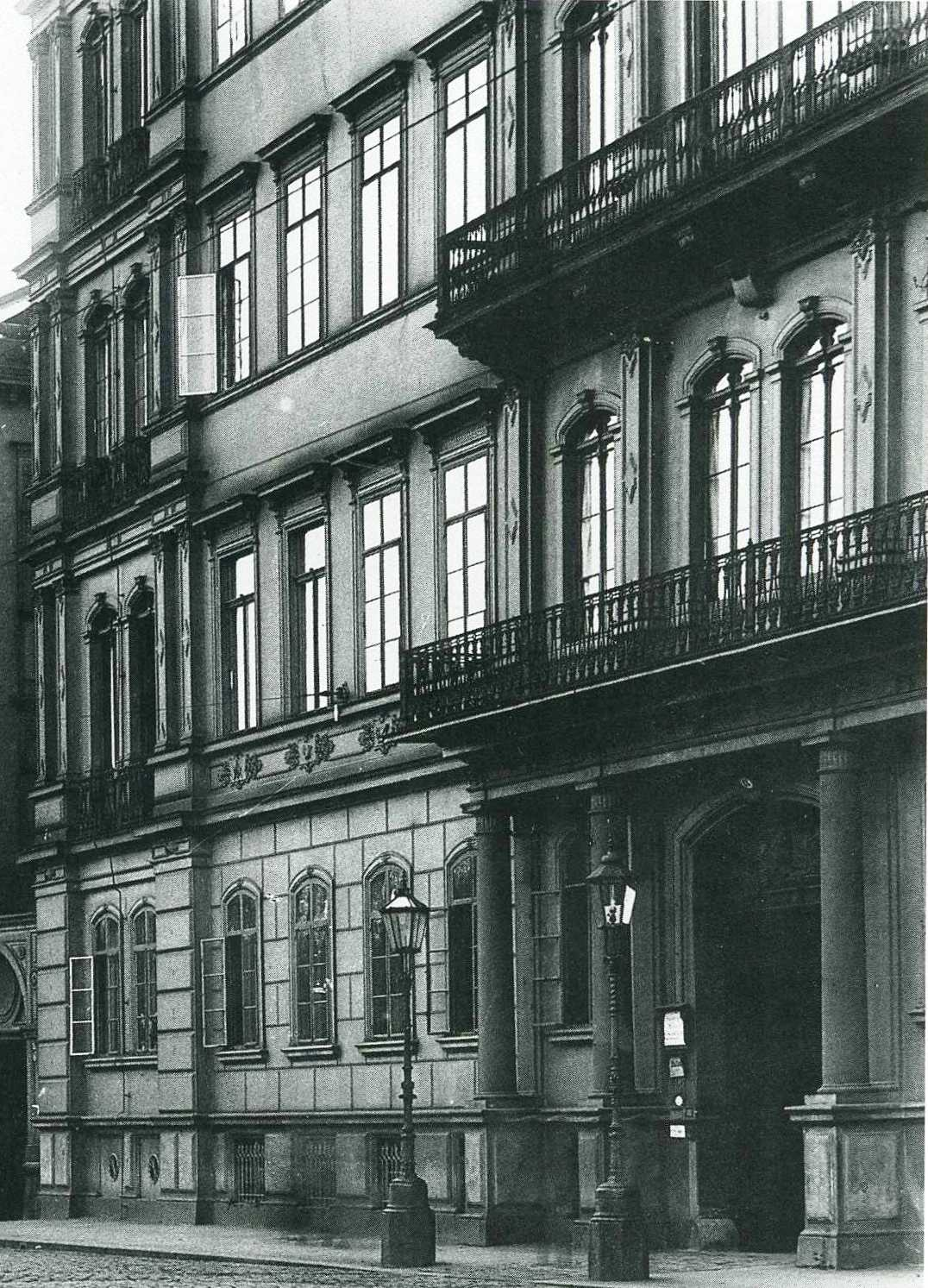
Palais Mietshaus Bürgerwiese 17

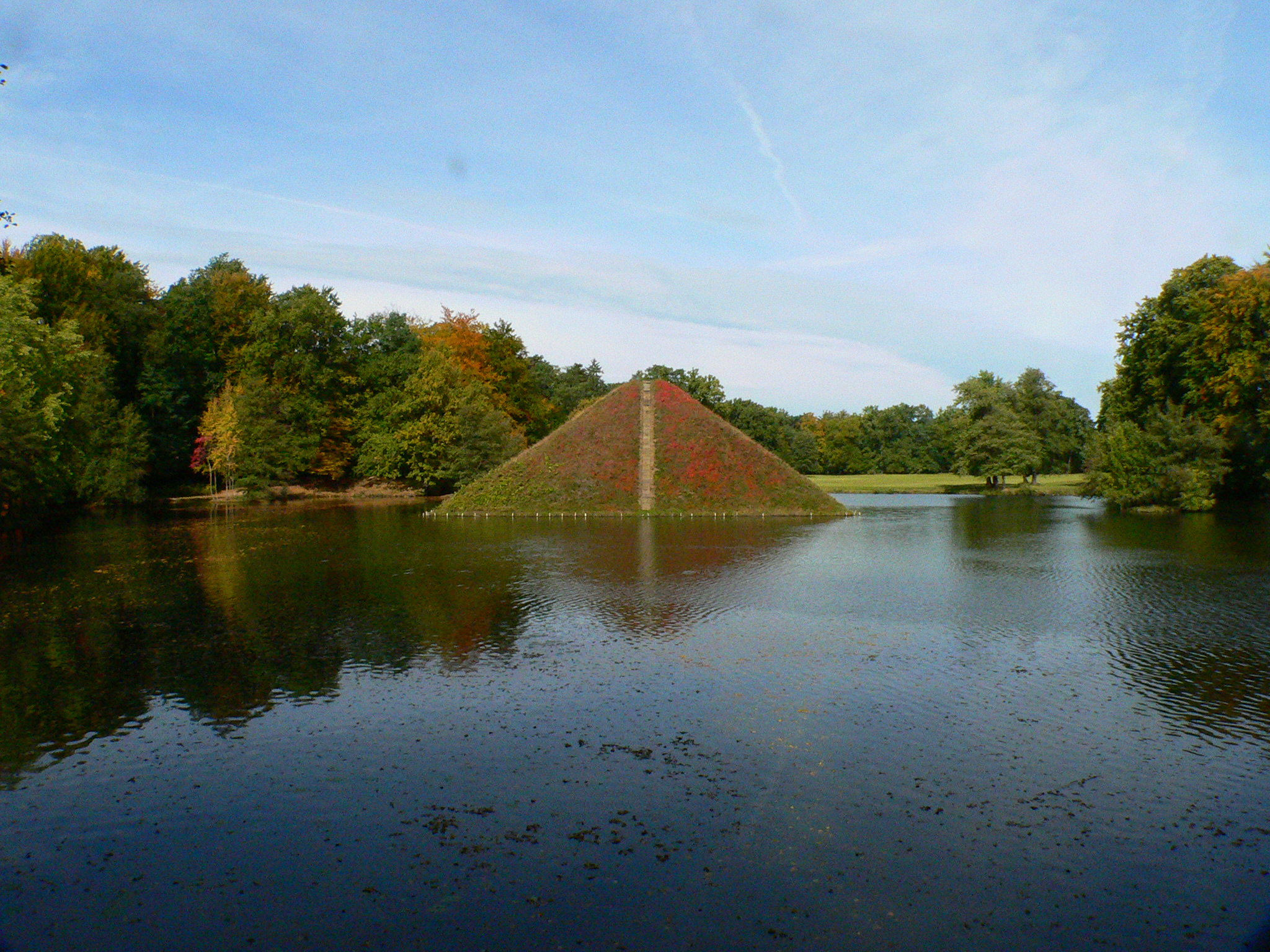
Burial site in Branitz Park

Lucie von Pückler spent the last years of her life in Dresden (in a corner house on the Bürgerwiese) and Branitz. She died in Branitz on 8 May 1854, at the age of 78. Lucie von Pückler was initially buried in the Vorpark cemetery. A few years after Hermann von Pückler's death, she was reburied next to him in Branitz Park.

== Literature ==
alphabetically sorted by authors / editors

- Heinz Ohff: Der grüne Fürst. Das abenteuerliche Leben des Fürsten Pückler-Muskau. Piper, München/Zürich 2002, ISBN 3-492-23715-0
- Astrid Roscher: Lucie von Pückler-Muskau. Heimliche Hauptakteurin im Schatten des grünen Fürsten? In: Die Gartenkunst 21 (2/2009), S. 187–197.
- Beate Schneider: Herzens Schnucke. Biographische Notizen über Lucie Fürstin von Pückler-Muskau. In: Zwischen Traum und Wissenschaft – Aspekte zum Zeitalter der Romantik = Publikation der wissenschaftlichen Beiträge der Romantiktagung an der Brandenburgischen Technischen Universität Cottbus vom Herbst 2002. Regia-Verlag, Cottbus 2005. ISBN 3-937899-54-5, S. 121–128.
- Stiftung Fürst-Pückler-Museum, Park und Schloss Branitz (Hrsg.): Die grüne Fürstin: Lucie von Hardenberg – die Frau Fürst Pücklers; anlässlich der Ausstellung Die Grüne Fürstin. Lucie von Hardenberg – die Frau Fürst Pücklers vom 20. Mai bis 31. Oktober 2010 im Schloss Branitz. Branitz 2010, ISBN 978-3-910061-10-1
