= Dega (woreda) =

District in the Oromia Region of Ethiopia

Coordinates: 8°35′N 36°10′E

Dega is one of the woredas in the Oromia Region of Ethiopia. Part of the Buno Bedelle Zone, Dega is bordered on the south by Chora, on the west by Supena Sodo, on the north by the Mirab Welega Zone, on the northeast by the southern exclave of the Benishangul-Gumuz Region, and on the east by Bedele. Towns in Dega include Dega and Mako. Mako woreda was part of Dega woreda.

== Demographics ==
The 2007 national census reported a total population for this woreda of 39,466, of whom 19,504 were men and 19,962 were women; 3,022 or 7.66% of its population were urban dwellers. The majority of the inhabitants practised Ethiopian Orthodox Christianity, with 43.82% of the population reporting they observed this belief, while 40.49% of the population said they were Protestant, and 15.57% were Moslem.

Based on figures published by the Central Statistical Agency in 2005, this woreda has an estimated total population of 63,542, of whom 32,871 are men and 30,671 are women; 4,876 or 7.67% of its population are urban dwellers, which is less than the Zone average of 12%. With an estimated area of 882.35 square kilometers, Dega has an estimated population density of 72 people per square kilometer, which is about the same as the Zone average of 72.3.

The 1994 national census reported a total population for this woreda of 45,423, of whom 22,029 were men and 23,394 women; 2,731 or 6.01% of its population were urban dwellers at the time. The three largest ethnic groups reported in Dega were the Oromo (91.91%), the Amhara (6.68%), and the Tigrayan (1.17%); all other ethnic groups made up 0.24% of the population. Oromiffa was spoken as a first language by 93.23%, and 5.61% spoke Amharic; the remaining 1.16% spoke all other primary languages reported. The majority of the inhabitants professed Ethiopian Orthodox Christianity, with 81.36% of the population reporting they practiced that belief, while 9.87% of the population said they were Muslim, 5.29% were Protestant, and 3.3% held traditional beliefs.
