= Bedele Zuria =

Woreda or district of Ethiopia

Coordinates: 8°30′N 36°20′E

Bedele nanowa is one of the woredas in the Oromia Region of Ethiopia. Part of the Illubabor Zone, Bedele Zuria is bordered on the south by Gechi, on the southwest by Chora, on the west by Dega, on the north by the southern exclave of the Benishangul-Gumuz Region, on the northeast by the Didessa River which separates it from the Misraq Welega Zone, and on the southeast by Gechi. Towns in Bedele Zuria include Bedele. Bedele Zuria, Chewaka, Dabo Hana woredas and Bedele town were part of former Bedele woreda.

== Overview ==
Coffee is an important cash crop of this woreda, where over 50 square kilometers are planted with this crop. Another important crop is tea; in 1995 East African Agri-Business (a subsidiary of East African Group (Ethiopia)) founded a tea plantation covering 870 hectares at Chewaka, about 90 kilometers northwest of the town of Bedele, with an initial investment of 87 million Birr. Other local industry includes the Bedele brewery.

This woreda was selected by the Ministry of Agriculture and Rural Development in 2003 as one of several areas for voluntary resettlement for farmers from overpopulated areas. Bedele was planned to be the new home for 2087 households consisting of a total of 4042 total family members. These people were settled at Chewaka. However, far more people actually came to live there: 8000 households arrived in the first phase, and 6000 more in the second phase. A survey by the Ethiopian Disaster Prevention and Preparedness Commission performed in the first half of April 2004 found their living conditions deplorable. They found the settlers' nutritional status was poor, with only one grain mill available for each of the seven sub-sites, which resulted in a wait of one to two weeks to have their cereal ground for eating. There was inadequate drinking water. The inhabitants and their children were reported to "have no clothes to wear except a single blanket provided to each households. Those households with many family members pointed out that they are suffering from cold due to lack of clothes and proper sheltering." There was no school for the children, and while there were numerous medical clinics, the facilities were reportedly understaffed.

== Demographics ==
The 2007 national census reported a total population for this woreda of 77,687, of whom 38,654 were men and 39,033 were women; none of its population were urban dwellers. The majority of the inhabitants were Moslem, with 53.8% of the population reporting they observed this belief, while 28.37 of the population said they practised Ethiopian Orthodox Christianity, and 17.69% were Protestant.

Based on figures published by the Central Statistical Agency in 2005, this woreda has an estimated total population of 139,425, of whom 71,749 are men and 67,676 are women; 23,673 or 16.98% of its population are urban dwellers, which is greater than the Zone average of 12%. With an estimated area of 1,678.44 square kilometers, Bedele has an estimated population density of 83.1 people per square kilometer, which is greater than the Zone average of 72.3.

The 1994 national census reported a total population for this woreda of 97,477, of whom 47,353 were men and 50,124 women; 13,243 or 13.59% of its population were urban dwellers at the time. The two largest ethnic groups reported in Bedele were the Oromo (91.16%), and the Amhara (6.22%); all other ethnic groups made up 2.62% of the population. Oromiffa was spoken as a first language by 93.19%, and 5.19% Amharic; the remaining 1.62% spoke all other primary languages reported. The majority of the inhabitants professed Ethiopian Orthodox Christianity, with 60.42% of the population reporting they practiced that belief, while 29.31% of the population said they were Muslim, 5.06% held traditional beliefs, and 4.91% were Protestant.
