= Machbuba =

German slave of Oromo origin (1820s–1840)

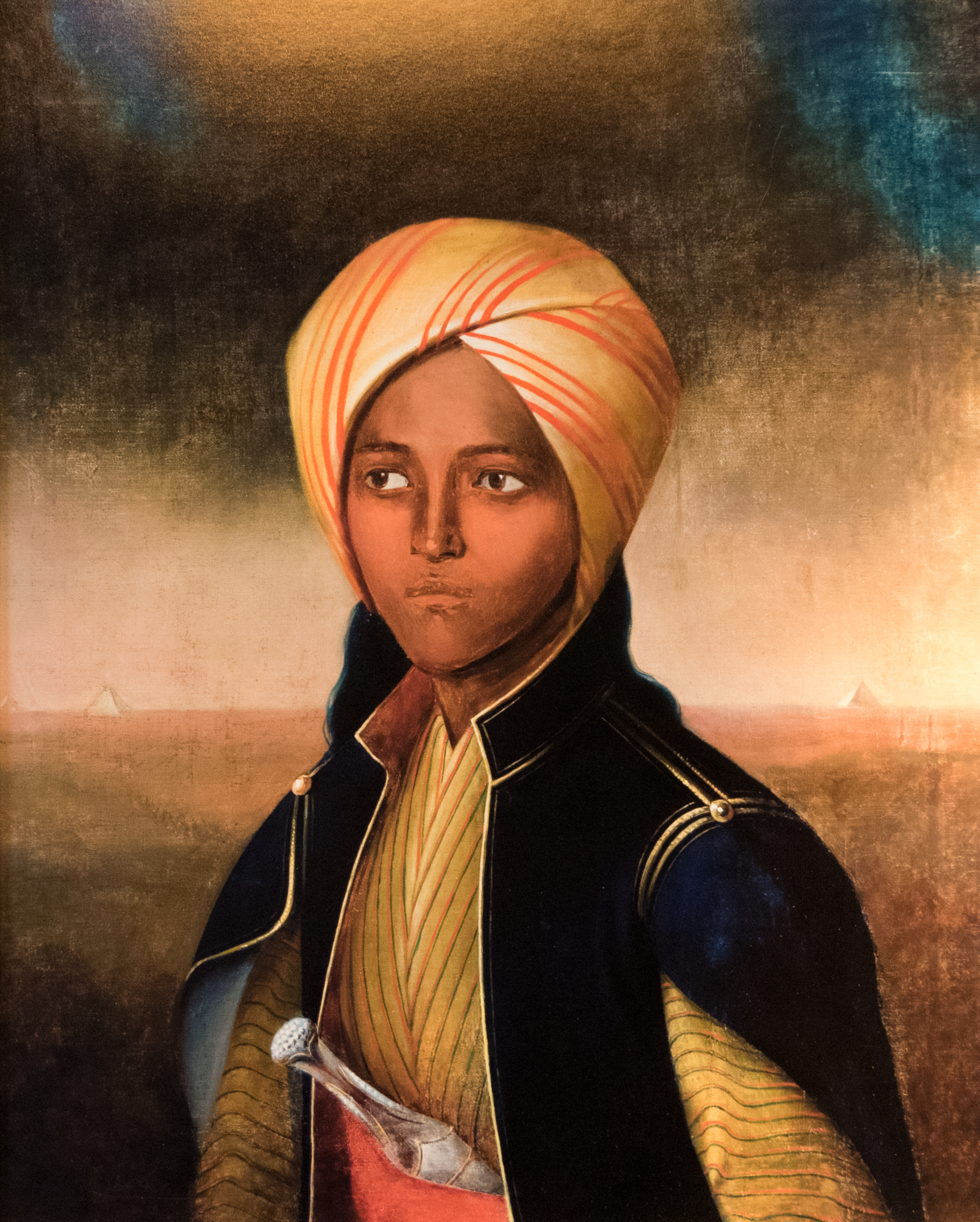
- Unknown Artist, Portrait of Mahbuba, oil on canvas, ca. 1840, 72.5 × 59 cm, Branitz: Stiftung Fürst-Pückler-Museum Park und Schloss Branitz, inventory no. VII K1/353.
- Born: c. 1825; Ethiopia
- Died: 27 October 1840; Bad Muskau
- Other names: Mahbuba, Ajiamé, Bilillee

Mahbuba (Arabic: محبوبة / maḥbūba c. 1825 – 27 October 1840) was an Oromo girl from present-day Ethiopia who was taken to Germany as a slave. She is known to have helped lay the foundations for the Oromo language studies in Europe by reciting her oral traditions through songs.

== Mahbuba, Ajiamé, Bilillee ==
The subject of this article is most often called ‘Mahbuba’ or ‘Machbuba’, which is an Arabic name that means ‘beloved’. She appears to have been given this name after being sold as a slave.

Elsewhere she is called 'Ajiamé' or 'Agiamé', which is also derived from the Arabic term ʿaǧamī.

But her birth name was 'Bilillee'.

== Life ==
Some details of Bilillee's early life are unclear, but it appears that she was born in the Kingdom of Gumma, in present-day southwestern Ethiopia. She was captured with her sister during local fighting, and, while still a child, taken by slave traders to north Gondar then to Khartoum and finally to Cairo. It was there in 1837 that she was purchased by Prince Hermann Ludwig Heinrich von Pückler-Muskau.

In a letter to his wife Lucie, Pückler-Muskau referred to Bilillee as his ‘mistress'. She was taken by him on his travels before returning to Germany with him in the Spring of 1840. She died in October that year, possibly from tuberculosis, at Muskau Castle in the Kingdom of Saxony and buried in St. Jacobi Cemetery in the village of Bad Muskau.

Upon her death, Pückler-Muskau wrote to a friend that Bilillee was ‘the being I loved most in all the world’. A death mask was taken as well as a posthumous portrait. The portrait depicts her dressed in a 'Mamluk costume and positioned in front of a desert landscape with pyramids [and] is less a realist representation of her than a visual manifestation of Orientalist fantasies.'

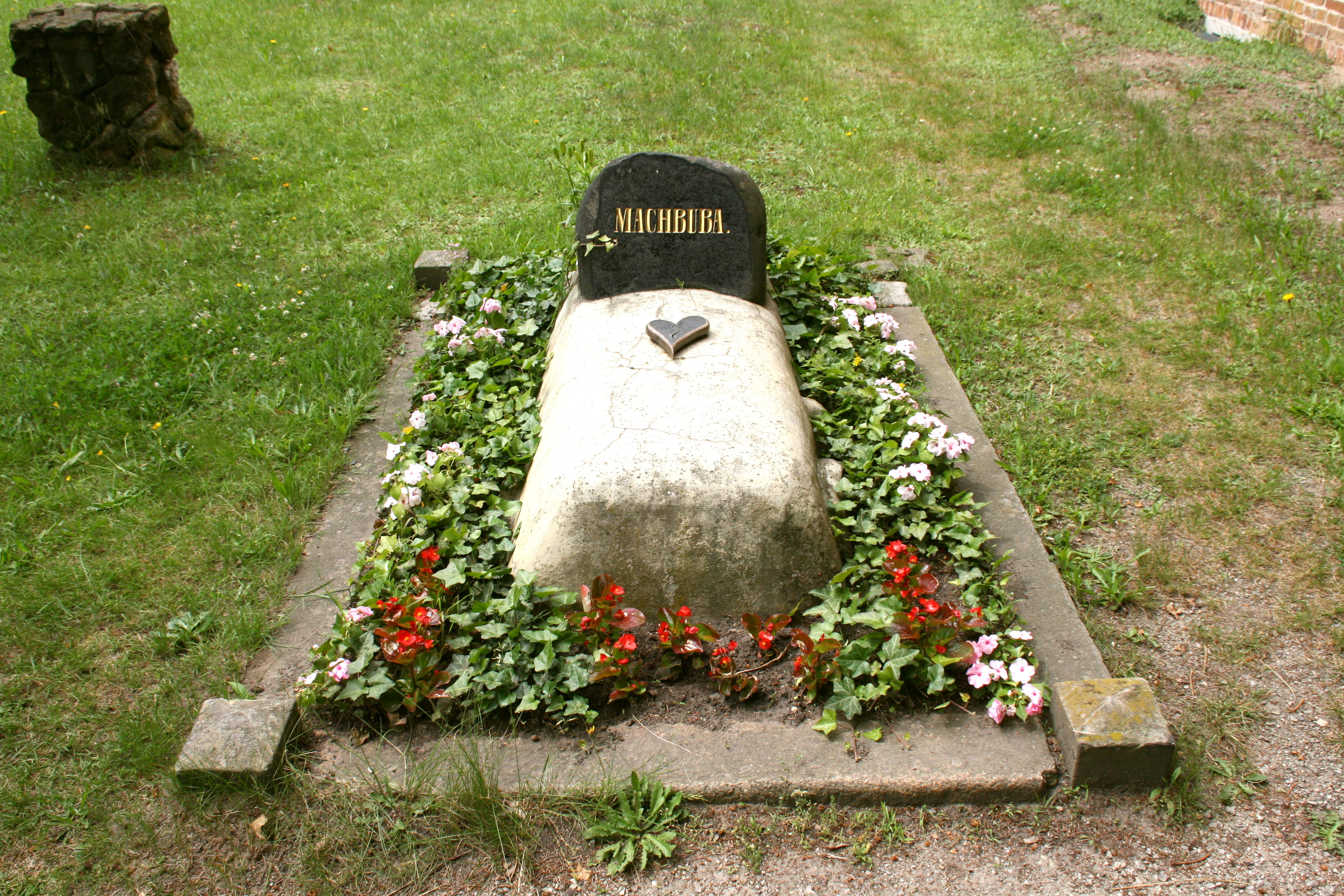
Grave of Mahbuba

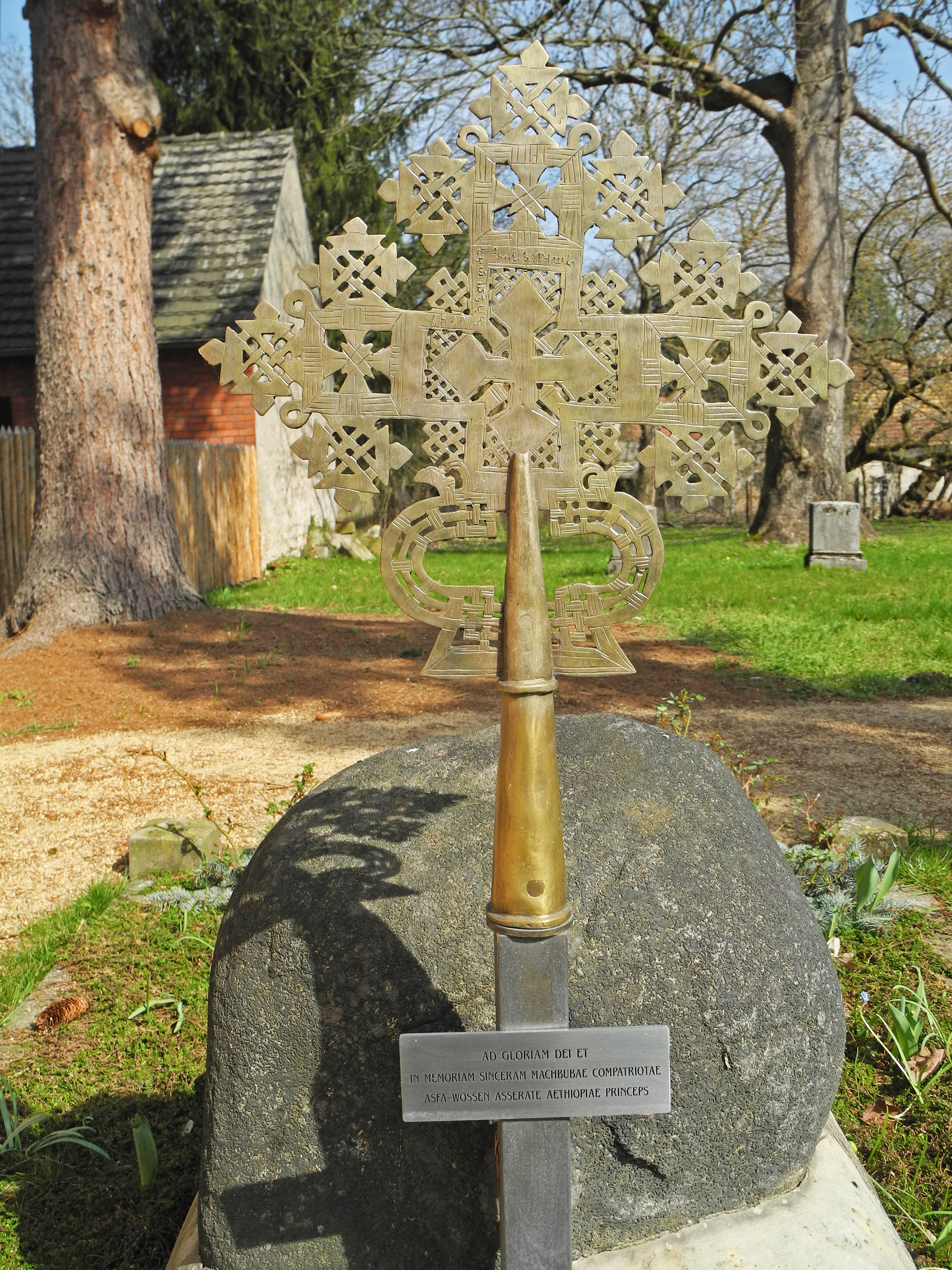
In September 2017, an Ethiopian cross was unveiled at the grave by Prince Asfa-Wossen Asserate.

Her grave can still be visited today. In September 2017, the writer Asfa-Wossen Asserate visited the grave and unveiled an Ethiopian memorial cross.

== Oral tradition ==
In 1838 Karl Tutschek was appointed tutor to several slaves who had arrived in Germany. They included an Oromo youth called Akafede Dalle and later Otshu Aga who in turn brought him into contact with Bilillee. Bilillee taught Aga several songs that were unfamiliar to her two compatriots. Bilillee then spent some of her last days before death reciting songs to Tutschek in 1840.

Tutschek used the information collected from the three, and later a fourth Oromo informant called Aman Gonda, to begin work on the first Oromo dictionary, which was published after his death in 1844 as the ‘Dictionary of the Galla Language’ (Munich).

Alongside his dictionary, Tutschek had transcribed 208 songs in Latin script and intended to translate them into German but died before this work could begin. It is believed these are almost all from Bilillee. The documents remained in his brother's possession before being rediscovered by Philipp Paulitschke in the 1890s while researching his Ethnographie Nordost-Afrikas. Paulitschke himself died before he could translate them and they appeared without explanation.

In 1997, over 150 years after her death, Bilillee's songs were translated into English by Gemetchu Megersa and published with further analysis by Claude Sumner.

In his introduction to the book, Lensa Gudina wrote: ‘She was a living library of Oromo songs [and through this book] Mahbuba still sings to us, as she did more than a century and a half ago to Karl Tutschek.’

163 of Bilillee's songs are included, such as this 'pastoral' song:

Oromo	English
Ja ha woko Hamaja lon bobase D’ufa kawa. Hamaja lon bobase Dale madscha. Gusae lon bobase Warri Mastscha Watesa lon bobase Gondol Wâqo. Hamaja lon bobase Harsama Bagito (Harsama kan D’adu Harka bekan jadu) Gorketa lon bobase Kobobabo Doladscha lon bobase.	O my desire! Hamaja is grazing cattle. Dufa Kawa! Hamaja is grazing cattle. Dale Matsha! Gusae is grazing cattle. Those of Matsha! Watesa is grazing cattle. Gondol Waqa! Hamaja is grazing cattle. Harsama Bagito! Harsama od Dadu! One seeks the hand he has known. Gorketa is grazing cattle. Kobobabo! Doladsha is grazing cattle.

Sumner explains that this would have been sung by a group of men in praise of family leaders, age grades, and bulls.
