= Didessa (woreda) =

District in Oromia Region, Ethiopia

Coordinates: 8°05′N 36°40′E

Didessa is one of the woredas in the Oromia Region of Ethiopia. It is named after the Didessa River, a tributary of the Abay River. Part of the Illubabor Zone, Didessa is bordered on the south by the Didessa River which separates it from the Jimma Zone, and on the north by Gechi. The major town in Didessa is Denbi.

Coffee is an important cash crop of this woreda. Over 50 square kilometers are planted with this crop. The proposed Didessa Wildlife Sanctuary will extend along the all-weather road from Nekemte to Bedele. The proposed area of the reserve will cover about 1,333 square kilometers containing a watershed with 14 small streams, and the habitat of about 54 plant species, 30 mammal species, and a number of birds.

== Demographics ==
The 2007 national census reported a total population for this woreda of 84,929, of whom 42,822 were men and 42,107 were women; 5,649 or 6.65% of its population were urban dwellers. The majority of the inhabitants were Moslem, with 84.45% of the population reporting they observed this belief, while 11.3% of the population said they practised Ethiopian Orthodox Christianity, and 2.76% were Protestant.

Based on figures published by the Central Statistical Agency in 2005, this woreda has an estimated total population of 62,516, of whom 31,466 are men and 31,050 are women; 6,369 or 10.19% of its population are urban dwellers, which is less than the Zone average of 12%. With an estimated area of 623.44 square kilometers, Didessa has an estimated population density of 100.3 people per square kilometer, which is greater than the Zone average of 72.3.

The 1994 national census reported a total population for this woreda of 44,425, of whom 22,130 were men and 22,295 women; 3,560 or 8.01% of its population were urban dwellers at the time. The four largest ethnic groups reported in Didessa were the Oromo (90%), the Amhara (5.3%), the Kambaata (1.08%), and the Sebat Bet Gurage (0.99%); all other ethnic groups made up 2.63% of the population. Oromiffa was spoken as a first language by 90%, 6.71% Amharic, and 1.03% Kambaata; the remaining 2.26% spoke all other primary languages reported. The majority of the inhabitants were Muslim, with 87.57% of the population reporting they practiced that belief, while 9.81% of the population said they professed Ethiopian Orthodox Christianity, and 2.15% were Protestant.
