= Mako (woreda) =

Administrative division of Ethiopia

Mako is one of the woredas in the Oromia Region of Ethiopia. It was part of Dega woreda.

== Demographics ==
The 2007 national census reported a total population for this woreda of 22,001, of whom 10,799 were men and 11,202 were women; none of its population were urban dwellers. The majority of the inhabitants were Protestant, with 72.2% of the population reporting they observed this belief, while 21.84% of the population said they practised Ethiopian Orthodox Christianity, and 5.85% were Moslem.
