= Branitz Palace =

Coordinates: 51°44′32″N 14°22′09″E

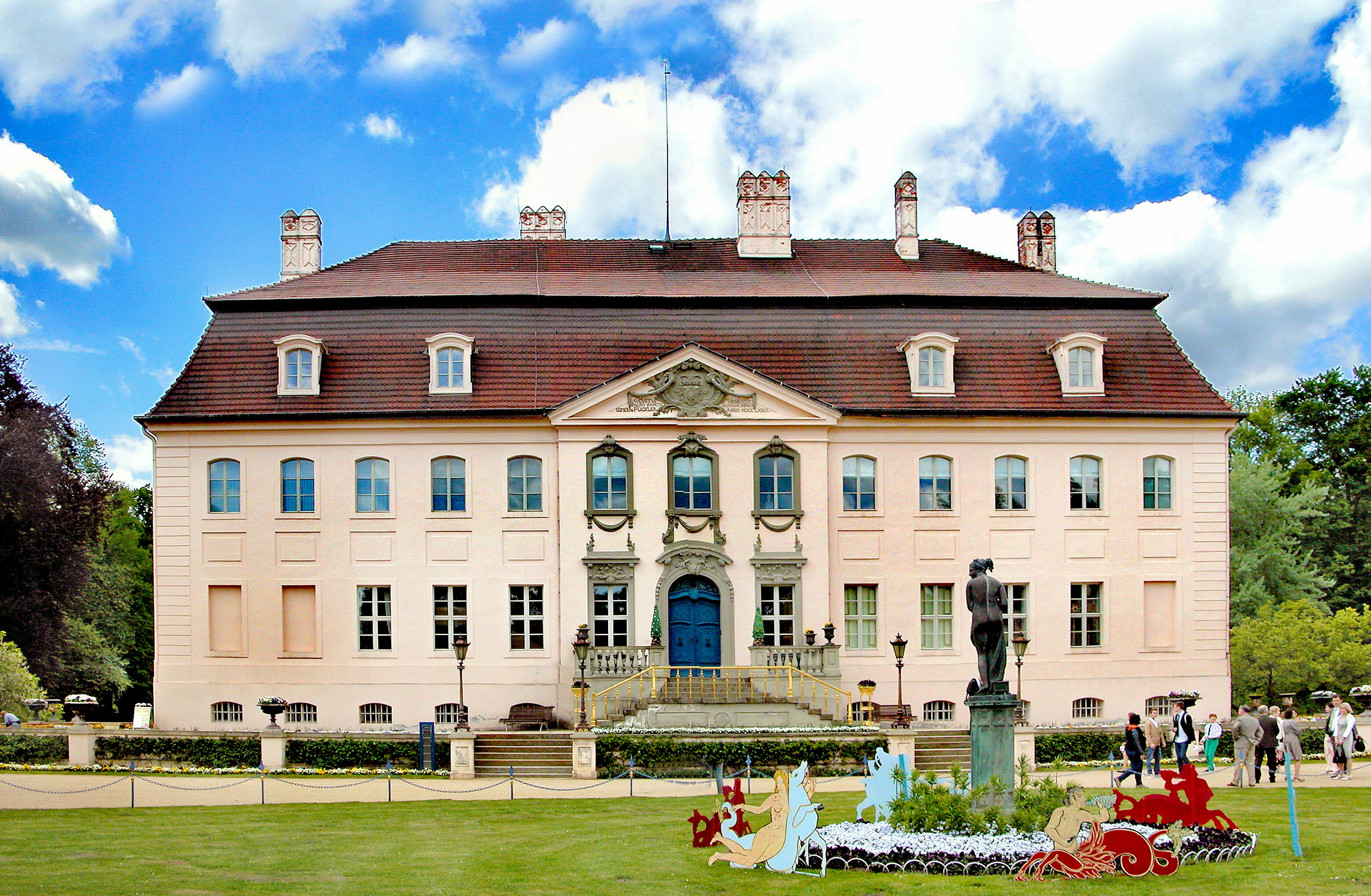
Branitz palace (2015)

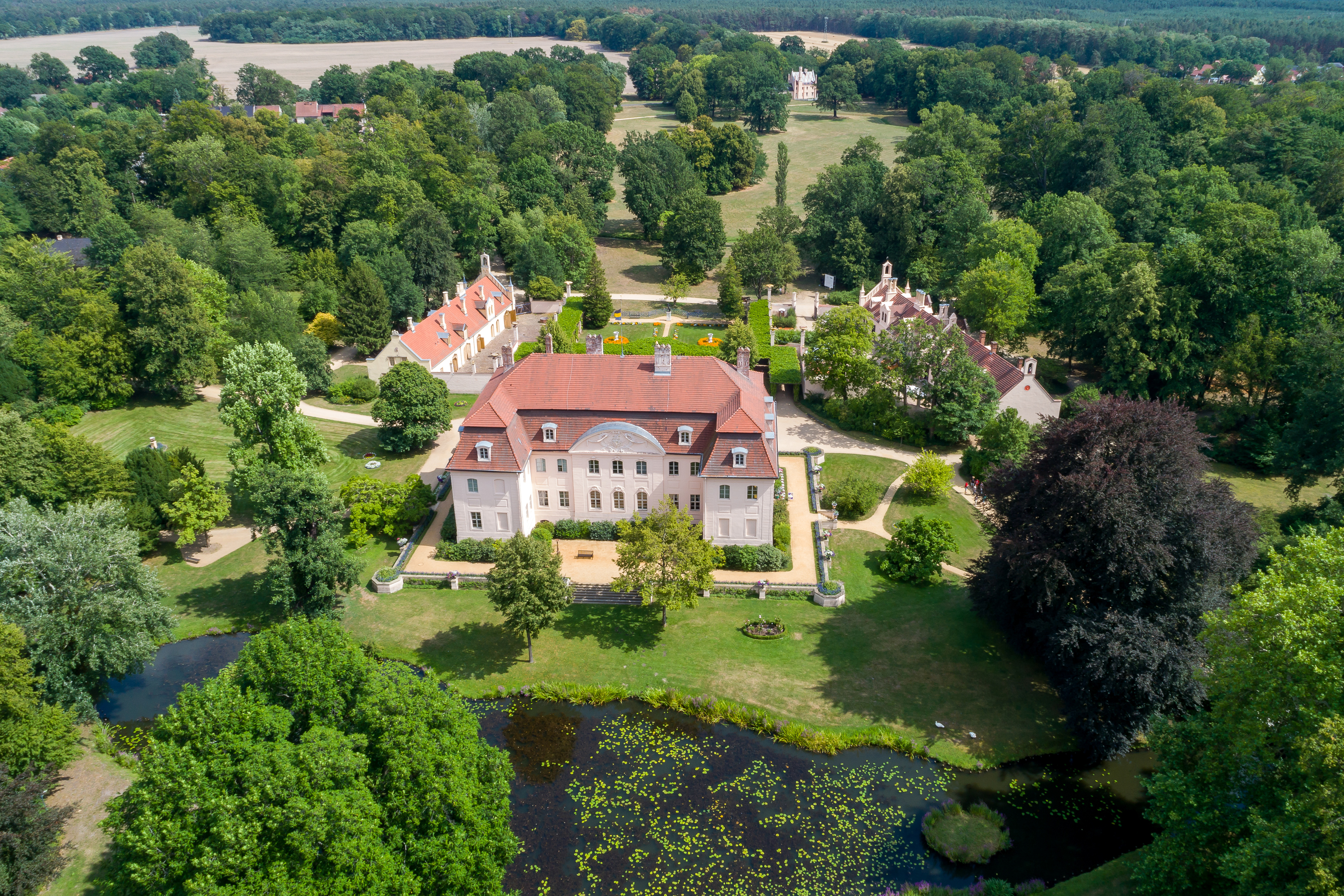
Branitz palace with Schlosssee (2021)

Branitz Palace is a baroque palace with interiors designed by Prince Hermann von Pückler-Muskau in Cottbus, Brandenburg, Germany. It was built in the 1770s and most of the furnishings date from around 1860. The palace is located in Branitz Park, near the center of Cottbus. It is located in the district of Sandow in Cottbus and borders on the district of Branitz. Branitz Palace is surrounded by a representative pleasure ground, which is divided into several differently themed gardens. The castle is classified as an architectural monument and is included in the list of architectural monuments in Cottbus.

== Palace complex ==
=== Palace ===
Branitz Castle was built in 1770 and 1771 for August Heinrich Count von Pückler (1720–1810). The Pückler family had already come into possession of the village of Branitz in 1696. In 1785, the family moved their ancestral seat to Muskau Castle in Bad Muskau and Branitz was leased out. Hermann von Pückler-Muskau eventually had to sell Muskau Castle and its park for financial reasons and moved to Branitz in 1845. There he began to create a landscape park based on the English model. From the following year, Branitz Palace underwent extensive renovations by architects from the Berlin Bauakademie. The plans were drawn up by the architects Rudolf Wilhelm Gottgetreu, Eduard Titz and Ferdinand von Arnim.

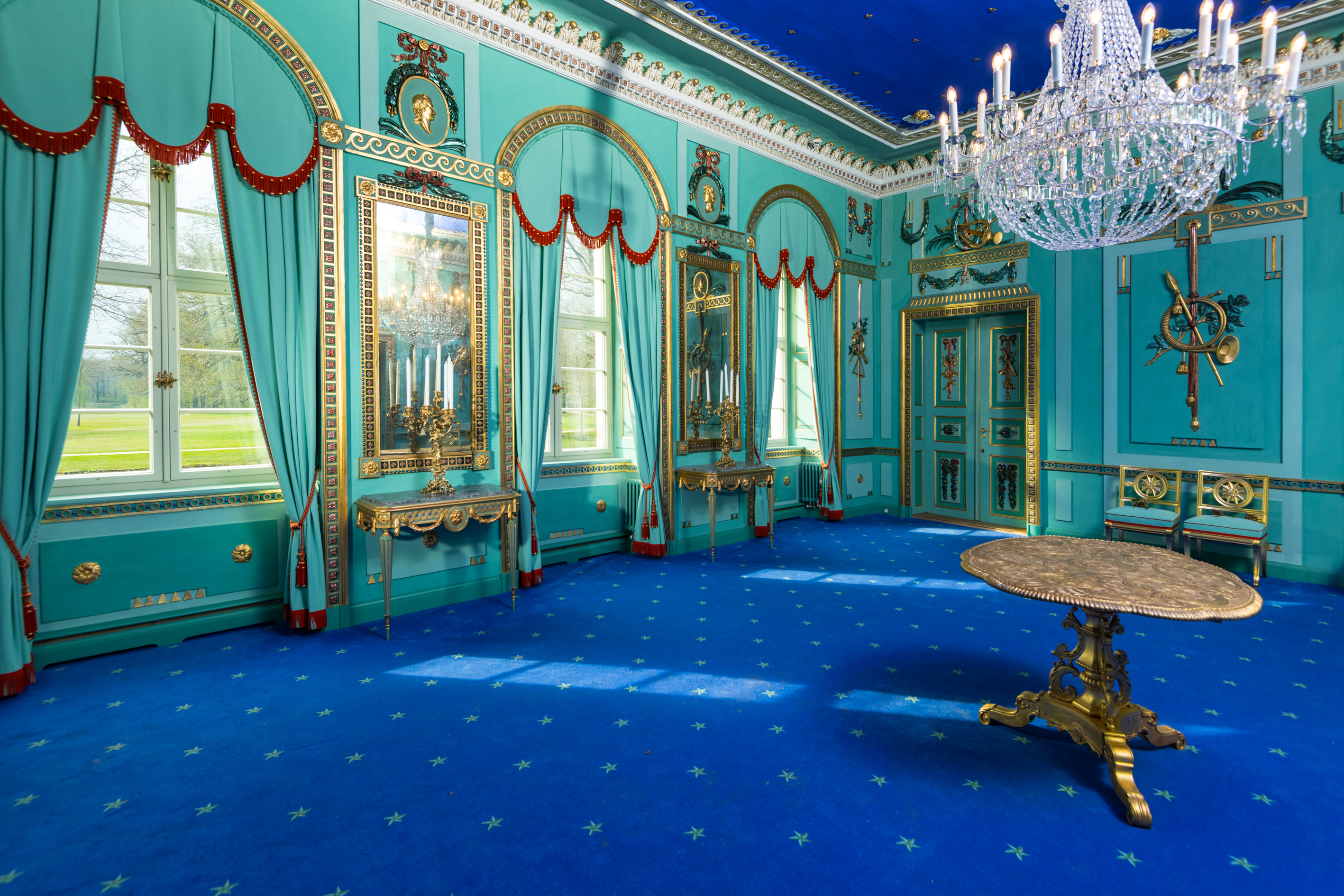
Green Hall inside the palace (2022)

Hermann von Pückler-Muskau used Branitz Castle as his retirement home. He died in the castle on February 4, 1871, and was buried in the lake pyramid in Branitz Park. Heinrich, Count von Pückler, a step-cousin of Hermann, subsequently lived in the castle. In 1934, Branitz Park and the castle were transferred from the then still independent municipality of Branitz to Cottbus. After the Second World War, the Princes of Pückler were expropriated and Branitz Castle became public property. Since then, the castle has been used as a museum. From 1946 to 1961, the building housed the Cottbus City Museum and then the Cottbus District Museum until 1990. Today, the museum exhibits the Pückler family home and a collection of paintings by Cottbus landscape painter Carl Blechen. The salons have been restored since 2013, and Prince Pückler's oriental dreams with their colorful paper wallpapers and oriental collection have been open to the public again since 2022.

Like the park, the palace has been part of the Prince Pückler Museum Park and Palace Branitz Foundation established by the city of Cottbus since 1995, which has been a foundation under public law of the state of Brandenburg since 2018. It is an architectural monument of the city of Cottbus in the list of monuments of the state of Brandenburg. Efforts are currently underway to include Branitz Park and the palace in the UNESCO World Heritage List. Branitz Park and Branitz Castle have been part of the European Garden Heritage Network since May 2019.

=== Mews and cavalier house ===
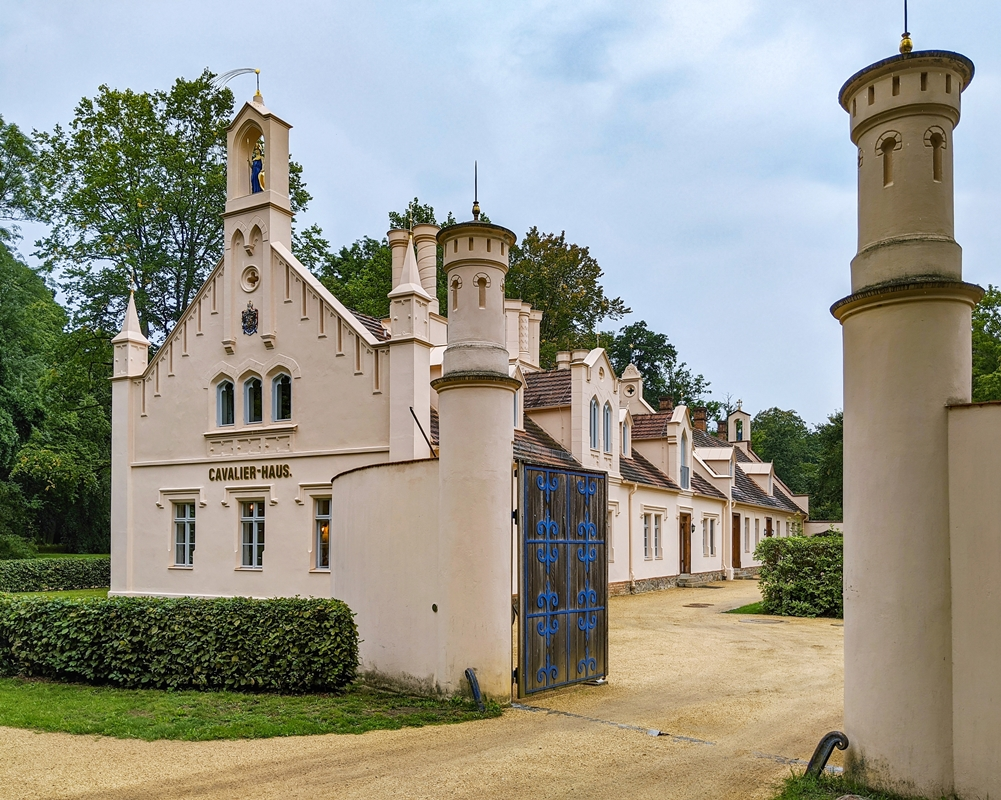
Cavalier's house (2020)

The mews are located in the castle courtyard to the north of the castle. The building was constructed in the second half of the 18th century during the construction of the palace and was also included in the renovations in the mid-19th century. The stables are relatively lavishly furnished for a stable, with a wooden, finely designed ceiling construction and blue and gold paintwork. Prince Hermann von Pückler-Muskau kept his favorite noble horses in the stables. His relationship to these animals is also evident in the design of the building. Further building work was carried out in 1877 and the stables were renovated between 1991 and 1993. Today the stables are used for various special exhibitions.

The Kavaliershaus was built some time before the palace was built, probably in the first quarter of the 18th century, and housed the court household. In 1857 and 1858, it was included in the palace renovation. The coat of arms of Pückler can be found on the north gable of the Kavaliershaus.The western gable features a zinc cast replica of the Madonna statue created by Friedrich Drake in 1829. The Kavaliershaus has housed a restaurant since 1988.

=== Park forge and estate farm ===
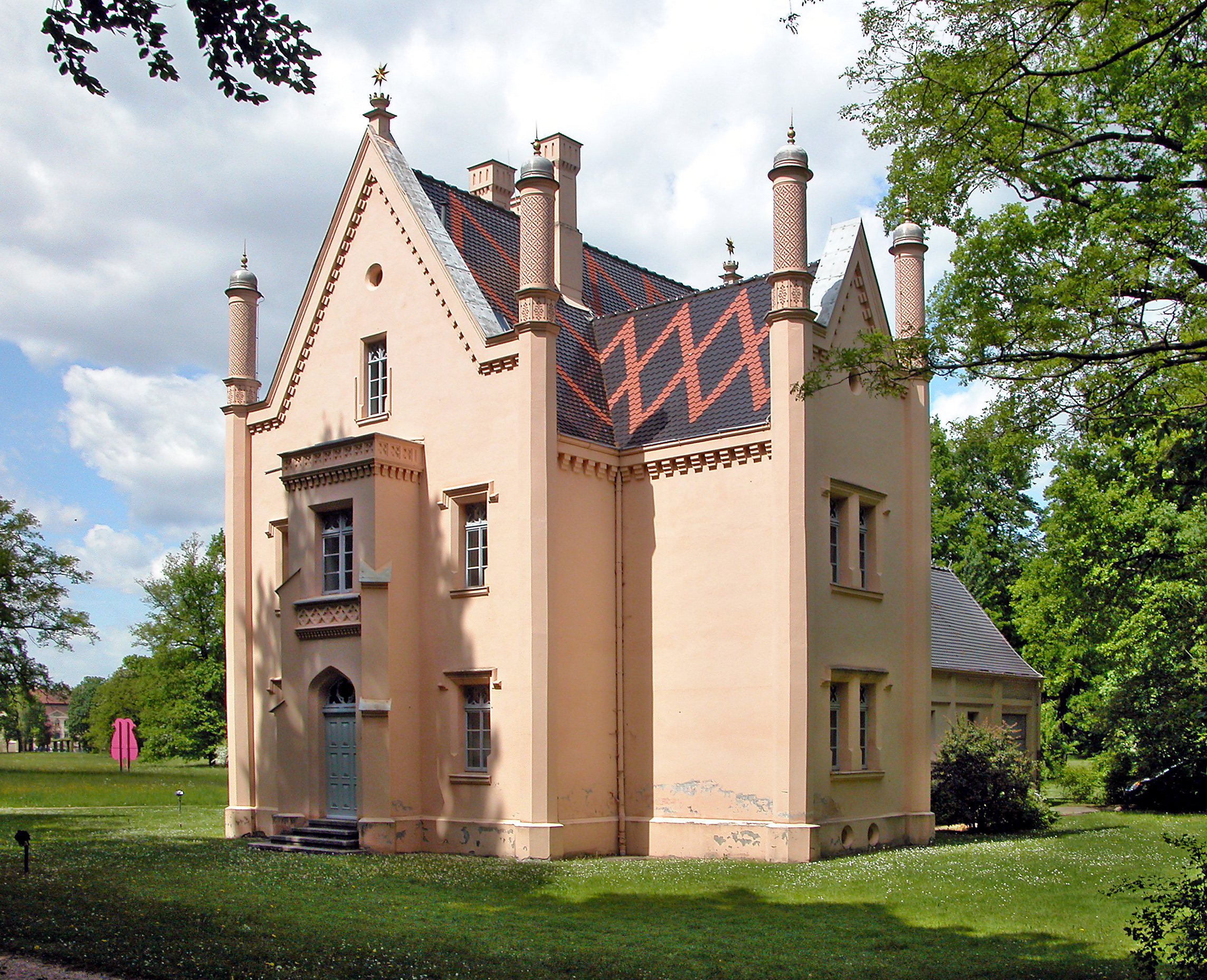
Parkschmiede building (2015)

The estate farm is located slightly to the north of the castle. The complex was built between 1852 and 1858 during the castle renovation under Hermann von Pückler-Muskau and consists of the estate inspector's house, the stable and residential buildings and a barn. The stables were historically used as sheep pens. Prince Hermann von Pückler-Muskau managed his estates from the estate inspector's house. Farm animals were also kept in the stables belonging to the estate farm, while Pückler's favorite horses were housed in the luxuriously furnished stables. All buildings were renovated between 2000 and 2003.

The Parkschmiede (Park forge) was built between 1849 and 1851, modeled on the Little Palace in Babelsberg Park. It marks the historical main entrance to the park. In addition to its use as a forge, the building was also the gatehouse for Branitz inner park. Today, the building is used for the collections, photo library, archive and library of the Fürst Pückler Museum.

=== Other structures ===
There were and are numerous other outbuildings around the palace, such as the park inspector's house (privately owned), the Branitz gatehouse, the former hunter's house and the park economy building. In total, there are 30 park buildings in the inner and outer park.
