= Hermann, Fürst von Pückler-Muskau =

German landscape artist and author (1785–1871)

Hermann von Pückler-Muskau
- Count (1785); Fürst (1822)
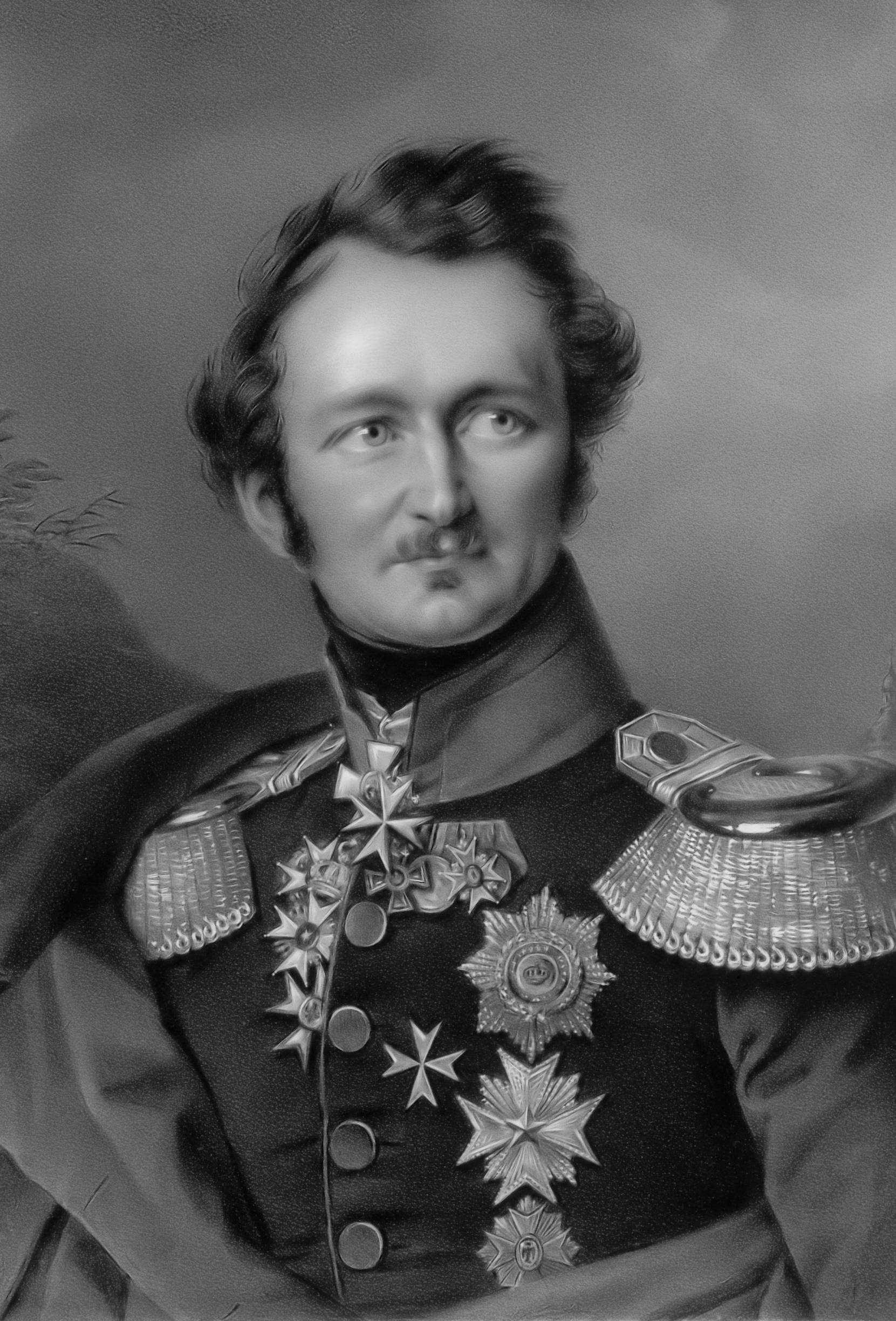

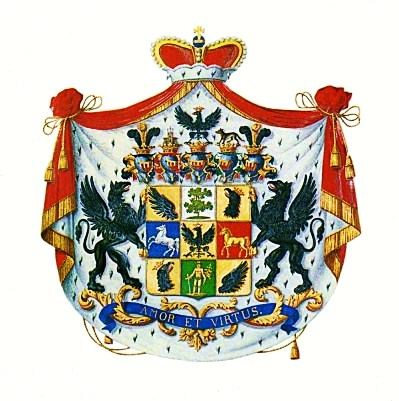
- Coat of arms
- Full name: Hermann Ludwig Heinrich von Pückler-Muskau
- Born: 30 October 1785; Muskau Castle, Electorate of Saxony, Holy Roman Empire
- Died: 4 February 1871 (aged 85); Branitz, Kingdom of Prussia, German Empire
- Buried: Branitz Palace
- Noble family: Pückler
- Spouse: Lucie von Pappenheim, née von Hardenberg
- Father: Carl Ludwig Hans Erdmann Pückler
- Mother: Clementine of Callenberg
- Occupation: Landscape gardener; author; soldier

Hermann, Fürst von Pückler-Muskau (born as Count Pückler, from 1822 Prince; 30 October 1785 – 4 February 1871) was a German nobleman, renowned as an accomplished artist in landscape gardening, as well as the author of a number of books mainly centering around his travels in Europe and Northern Africa, published under the pen name of "Semilasso".

== Early life and military career ==
Pückler-Muskau was the first of five children of Count Carl Ludwig Hans Erdmann von Pückler-Muskau-Groditz (1754-1811), and his wife, Countess Clementine of Callenberg (1770-1850), who gave birth to him at age 15. He was born at Muskau Castle (now Bad Muskau) in Upper Lusatia, then ruled by the Electorate of Saxony. He served for some time in the Saxon "Garde du Corps" cavalry regiment at Dresden, and afterwards traveled through France and Italy, often by foot. In 1811, after the death of his father, he inherited the Standesherrschaft (barony) of Muskau. Joining the war of liberation against Napoleon I of France, he left Muskau under the General Inspectorate of his friend, the writer and composer Leopold Schefer. As an officer under the Duke of Saxe-Weimar he distinguished himself in the field. Later, he was made military and civil governor of Bruges.

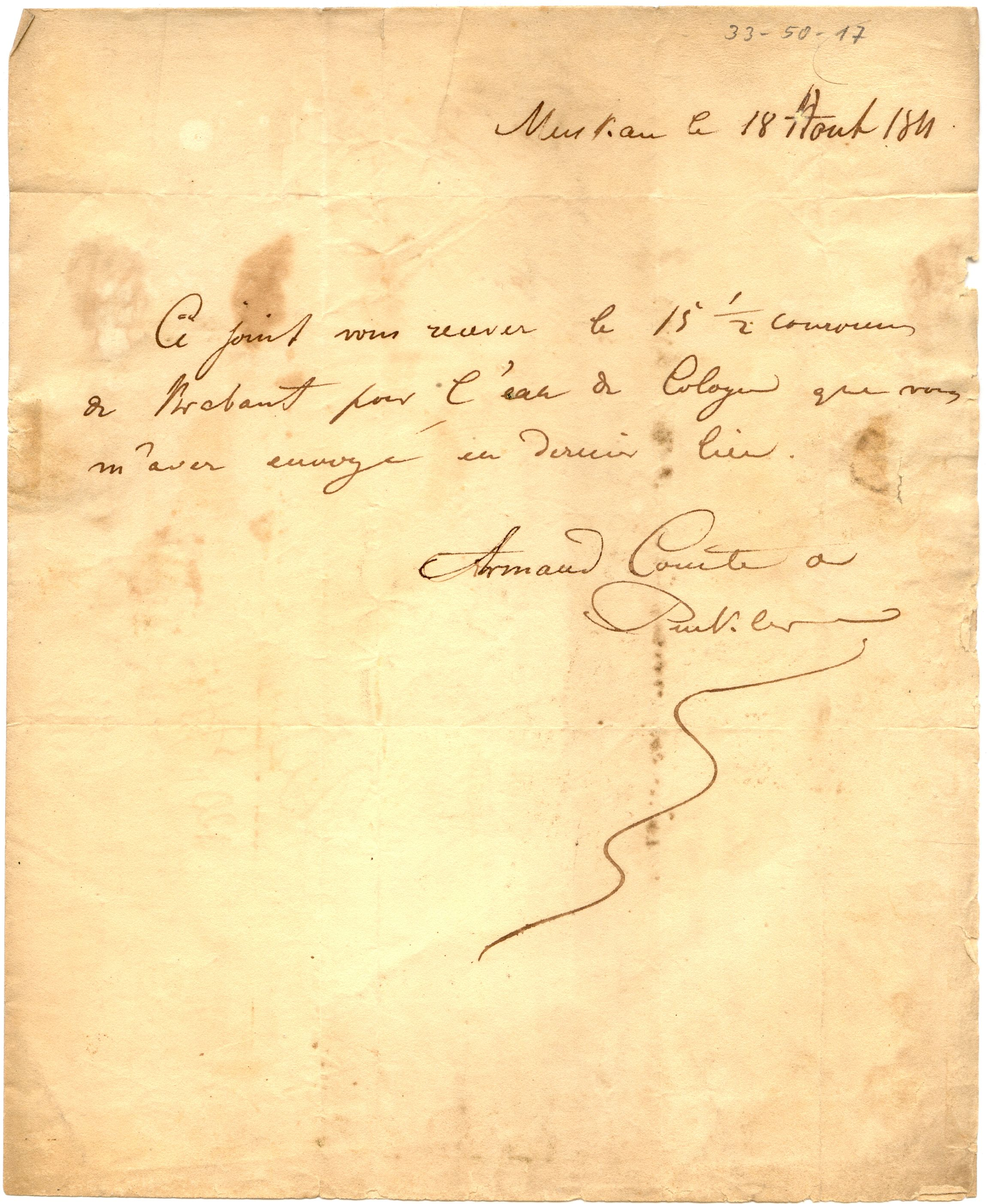
Letter of Count Puckler to Farina in Cologne 1811

== Tours of Great Britain and beyond ==
After the war he retired from the army and toured Great Britain for a year, moving with ease in aristocratic circles. He attended plays at His Majesty's Theatre, Haymarket and Drury Lane (admiring performances of Eliza O'Neill), studied parkland landscaping, and in Wales visited the Ladies of Llangollen in 1828. He remarked on the “coarseness and brutality” of the British theatre audiences as compared with the staid Continental audiences.

In 1822, in compensation for certain privileges which he resigned, he was raised to the rank of "Fürst" by King Frederick William III of Prussia. In 1817 he married the Dowager Countess Lucie von Pappenheim, née von Hardenberg, daughter of Prussian statesman Prince Karl August von Hardenberg. As early as 1820, Pückler considered selling the Muskau estate, as the fortune Lucie had brought with her had been used up. Lucie von Pückler made the unusual suggestion to her husband to dissolve the marriage so that he could once again go in search of a wealthy wife. The couple divorced in February 1826. The official reason given was that the couple had no children. Shortly before, in January 1826, Pückler had signed over the Pückler-Muskau estate to his wife in order to save his property from possible seizure.

Pückler actually went to England in September 1826 to look for a bride. As word of his intentions had spread quickly, the search was unsuccessful and was even commented on with derision in the English press. Nevertheless, the Prince remained in England for two years. In 1828 his tours took him to Ireland, notably to the seat of Daniel O'Connell in Kerry. During his time in England, he gathered new ideas for his park and wrote amusing letters about English society to his divorced wife. Lucie kept all the letters and prepared them for publication. After Pückler's return, the letters were published in two volumes.The book was an enormous success in Germany, and also caused a great stir when it appeared in English as Tour of a German Prince (1831–32).

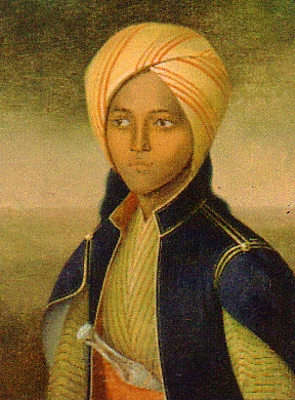
Mahbuba, ca. 1840

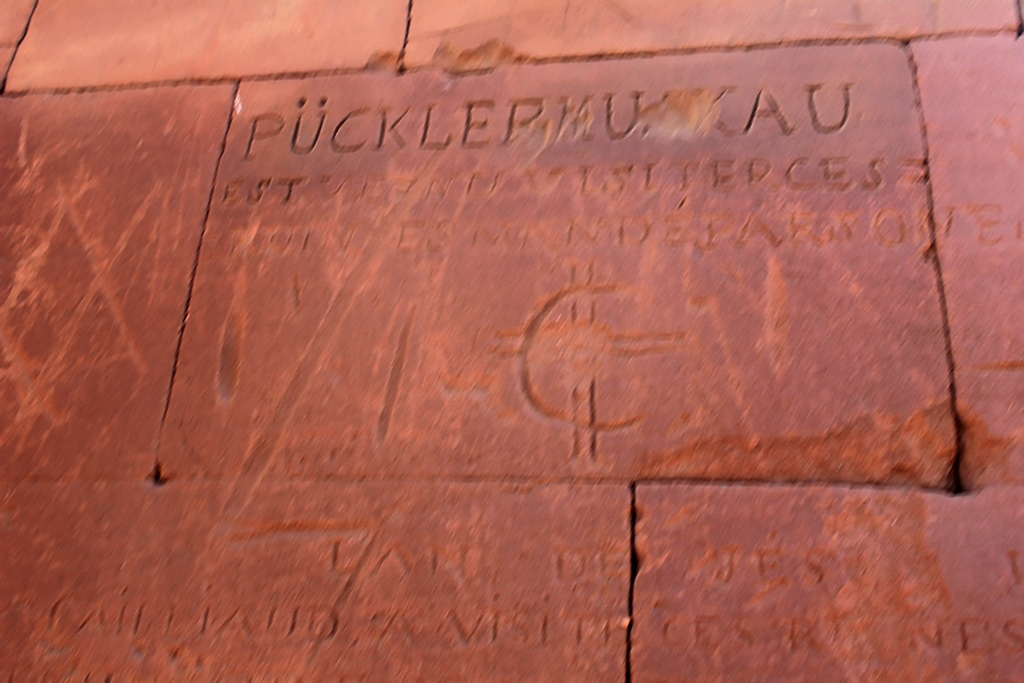
Pueckler's name carved in the Great Enclosure of Musawwarat

A daring character, he subsequently traveled in Algeria, Tunisia, Egypt, and Sudan and explored ancient Nubia. He is documented as having visited the site of Naqa in modern-day Sudan in 1837. He also visited the nearby site of Musawwarat es-Sufra, and in both places, he carved his name in the stone of the temples. In the same year, at the slave market in Cairo, he purchased an Ethiopian Oromo girl in her early teens, whom he named Mahbuba ("the beloved"). He took her to Asia Minor, Greece, and Vienna, where he introduced her to European high society, but Mahbuba developed tuberculosis and died in Muskau in 1840. Later he would write that she was "the being I loved most of all the world."

== Later life ==
He then lived in Berlin and Muskau, where he spent much time cultivating and improving Muskau Park, which still exists today. In 1845 he sold this estate, and, although he still lived from time to time at various places in Germany and Italy, his principal residence became Branitz Palace near Cottbus, where he laid out another splendid park.

Politically he was a liberal, supporting the Prussian reforms of Freiherr vom Stein. This, together with his pantheism and his colourful lifestyle, made him slightly suspect in the society of the Biedermeier period.

In 1863 he was made a hereditary member of the Prussian House of Lords, and in 1866 he attended — by then an octogenarian — the Prussian general staff in the Austro-Prussian War. He was decorated for his 'actions' at the Battle of Königgratz, even though the then 80-year-old Prince had slept throughout the day of the battle.

In 1871 the prince died at Branitz. Since human cremation was illegal at that time for religious reasons, he resorted to an ingenious evasion of traditional burial; he left instructions that his heart be dissolved in sulphuric acid, and that his body should be embedded in caustic soda, caustic potash, and caustic lime. Thus, on 9 February 1871, his denatured remains were buried in the Tumulus - an earth pyramid surrounded by a parkland lake at Branitzer Castle.

Dying childless, Pückler-Muskau's castle and estate passed to the heir of the princely title, his nephew Heinrich von Pückler, with money and other assets going to his niece Marie von Pachelbl-Gehag, née von Seydewitz. The prince's literary estate was inherited by writer Ludmilla Assing, who wrote his biography and posthumously published correspondence and diaries unpublished during his lifetime.

== Artist ==
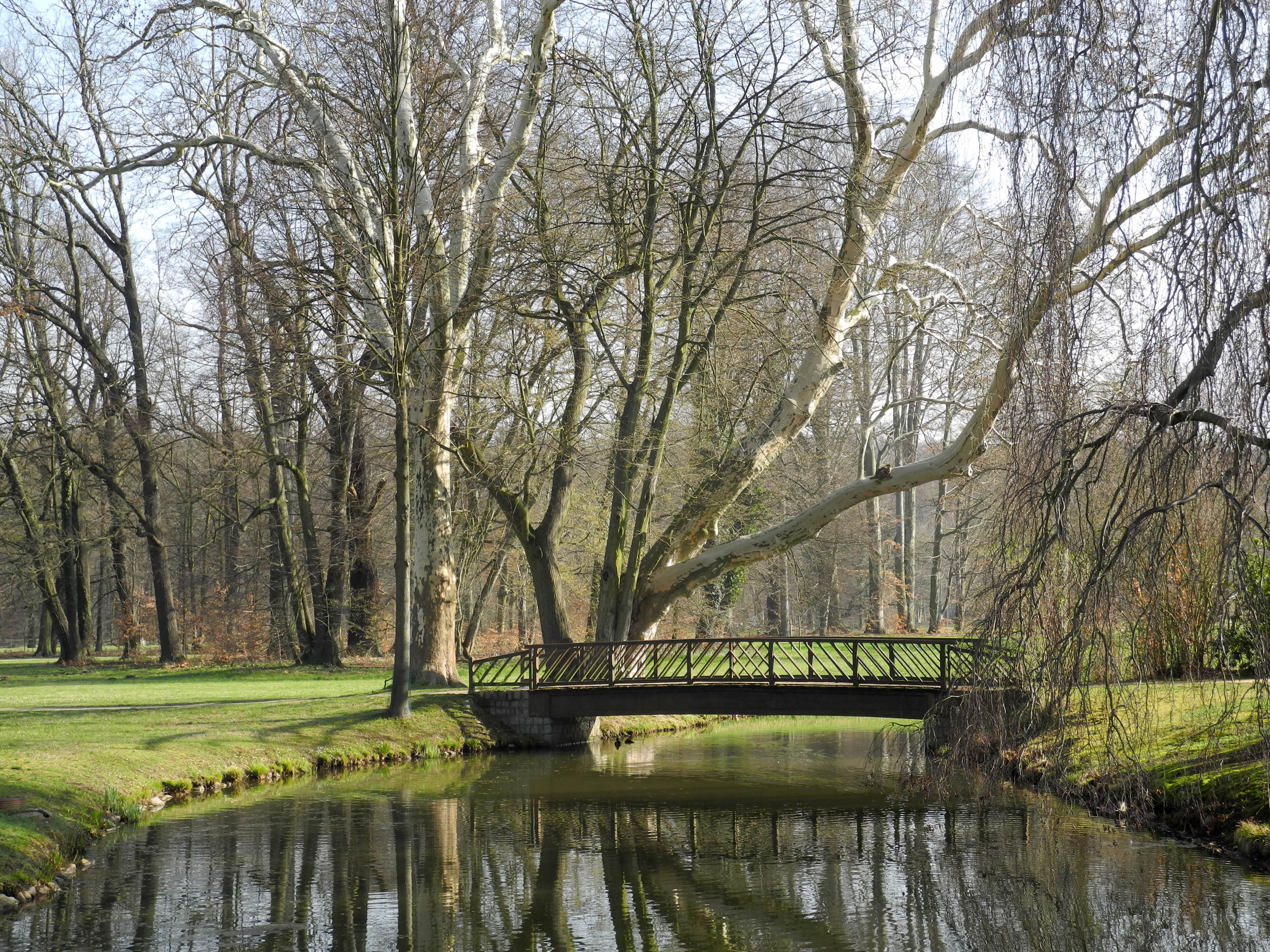
Muskau Park

As a landscape gardener, he is considered of European importance. As a writer of travel books, he holds a high position, his powers of observation being keen and his style lucid, animated, and witty. This is most evident in his first work Briefe eines Verstorbenen (4 vols, 1830–1831), in which he expresses many independent judgments about England and other countries he visited in the late 1820s and about prominent people he met. Among his later travel books are Semilassos vorletzter Weltgang (3 vols, 1835), Semilasso in Afrika (5 vols, 1836), Aus Mehemed Ali's Reich (3 vols, 1844) and Die Rückkehr (3 vols, 1846–1848). Andeutungen über Landschaftsgärtnerei (1834, "Remarks on Landscape Gardening") was the only book he published under his own name and was widely influential.

In 2016, the Bundeskunsthalle in Bonn dedicated an exhibition to the eccentric prince, with the title "Die Gartenlandschaften des Fürsten Pückler". Two of his gardens are listed on the UNESCO Lists of World Heritage Sites: one at Bad Muskau, the other Babelsberg near Potsdam, with both considered high points of European 19th-century landscape design.

There are also drawings and caricatures that he created, but did not publish.

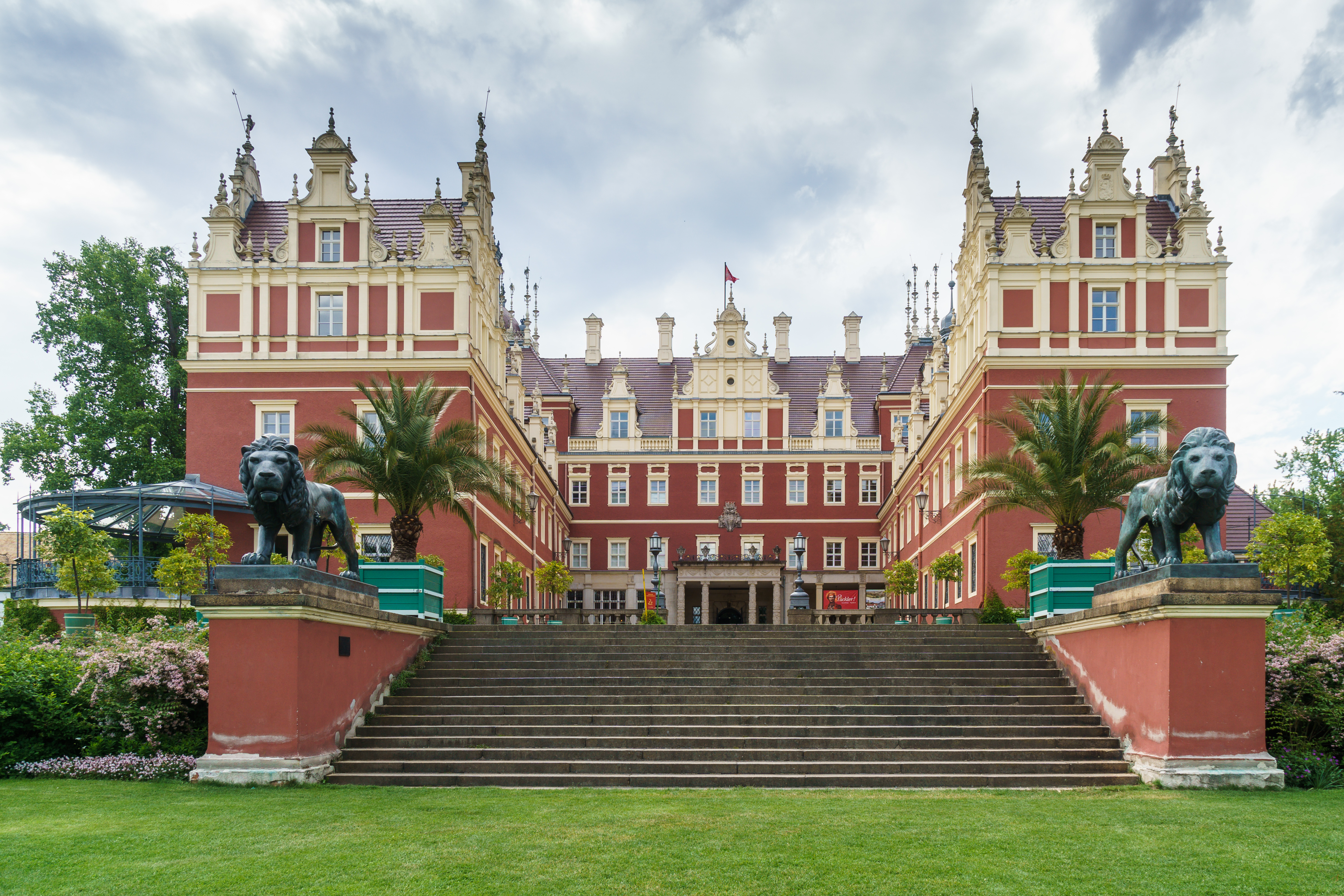
Schloss Muskau

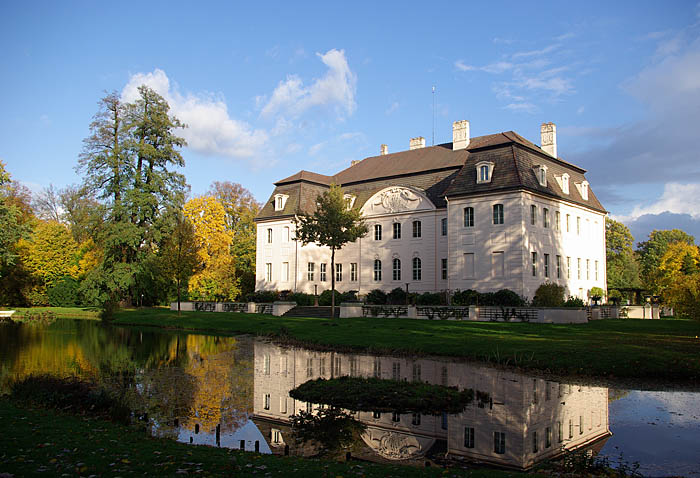
Branitz Palace

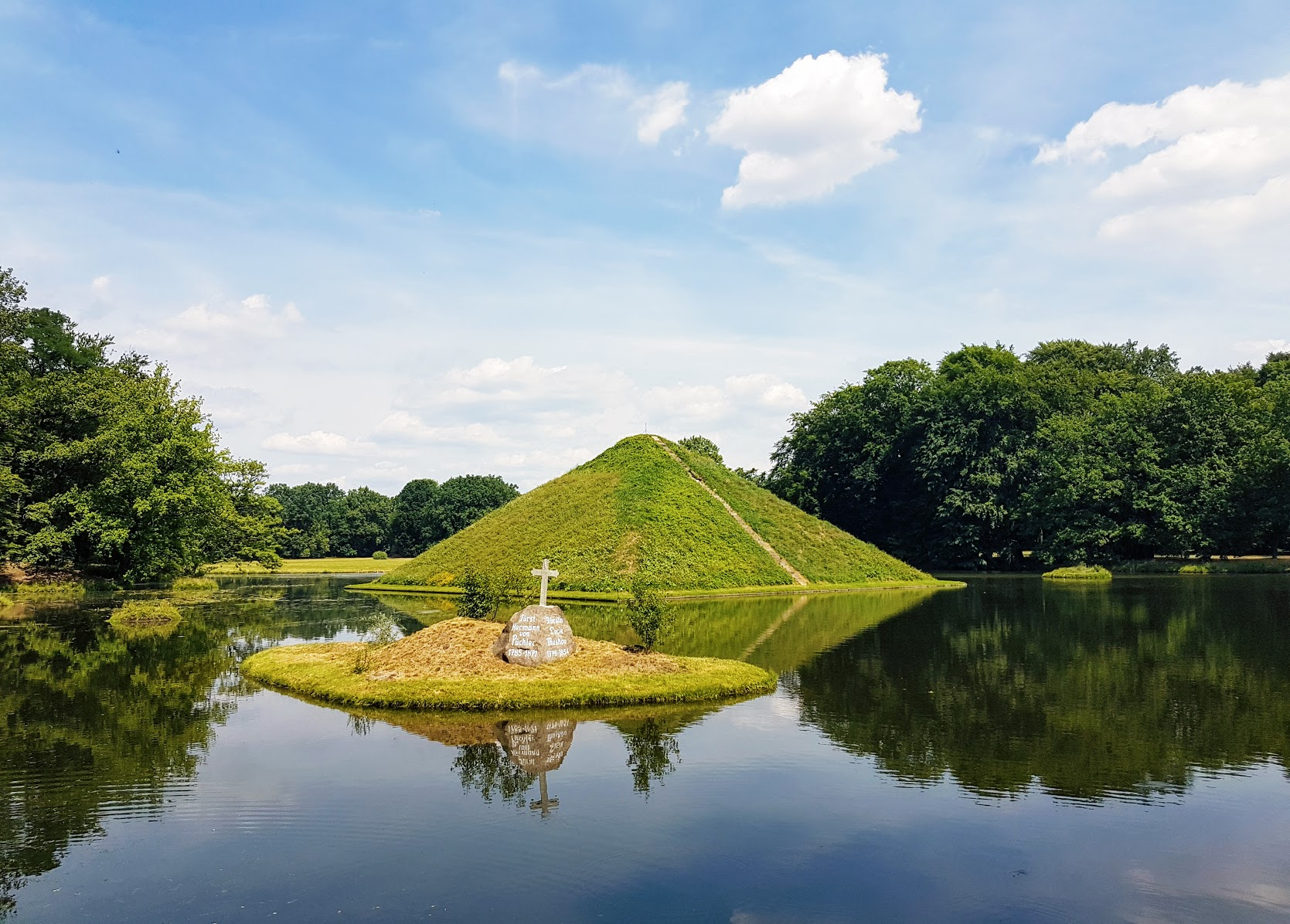
Burial pyramid of Hermann, Fürst von Pückler-Muskau at Branitz

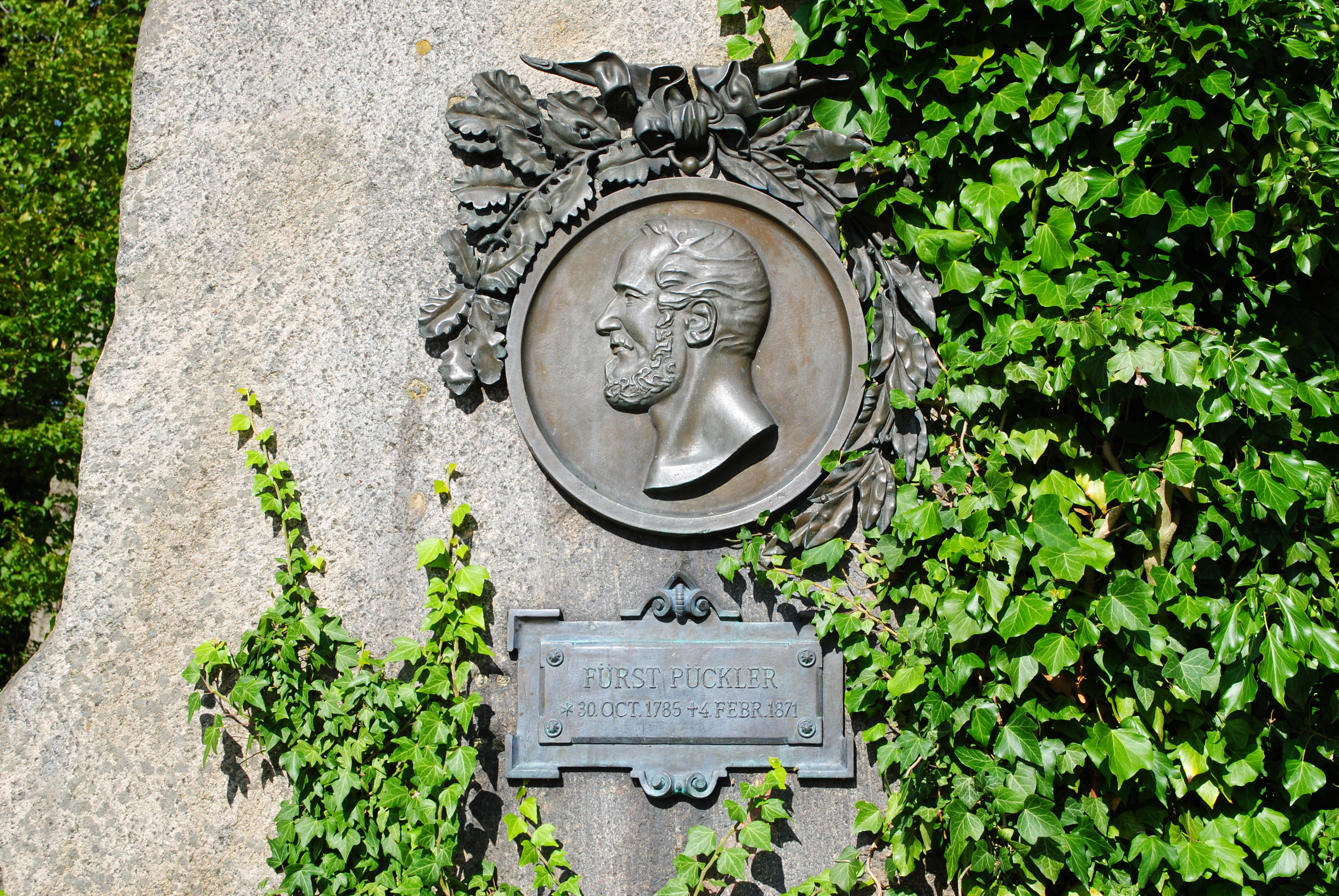
The likeness of Hermann von Pückler-Muskau on the stone in Muskau Park

=== Publications ===
- Briefe eines Verstorbenen (4 vols), 1830-31 (including a description of the Park of Warwick, which influenced strongly Edgar Allan Poe's The Domain of Arnheim)
- Tour of a German Prince, 4 vols, London, Wilson 1831-32 (translation of Briefe eines Verstorbenen by Sarah Austin)
- Andeutungen über Landschaftsgärtnerei[,] verbunden mit der Beschreibung ihrer praktischen Anwendung in Muskau (the only publication featuring him as author), 1834
- Tutti frutti; aus den Papieren des Verstorbenen., 5 vols, 1834
- Semilassos vorletzter Weltgang, 3 vols, 1835
- Semilasso in Afrika, 5 vols, 1836
- Der Vorläufer, 1838
- Jugend-Wanderungen, 1835
- Südöstlicher Bildersaal (on Greece), 1840
- Aus Mehemed Ali’s Reich (on Egypt), 3 vols, 1844
- Die Rückkehr, 3 vols, 1846–48
- Briefwechsel und Tagebücher des Fürsten Hermann von Pückler-Muskau (letters and diaries), 9 vols, ed. Ludmilla Assing, Hamburg 1873–76, Bern ²1971
- Liebesbriefe eines alten Kavaliers. Briefwechsel des Fürsten Pückler mit Ada von Tresckow (love letters), ed. Werner Deetjen, 1938
- Bettina von Arnim/Hermann von Pückler-Muskau: »Die Leidenschaft ist der Schlüssel zur Welt«. Briefwechsel 1832-1844, complete edition with commentary by Enid Gajek and Bernhard Gajek, Cotta, Stuttgart 2001, ISBN 3-7681-9809-X

== Honours ==
=== Fürst-Pückler-Eis ===
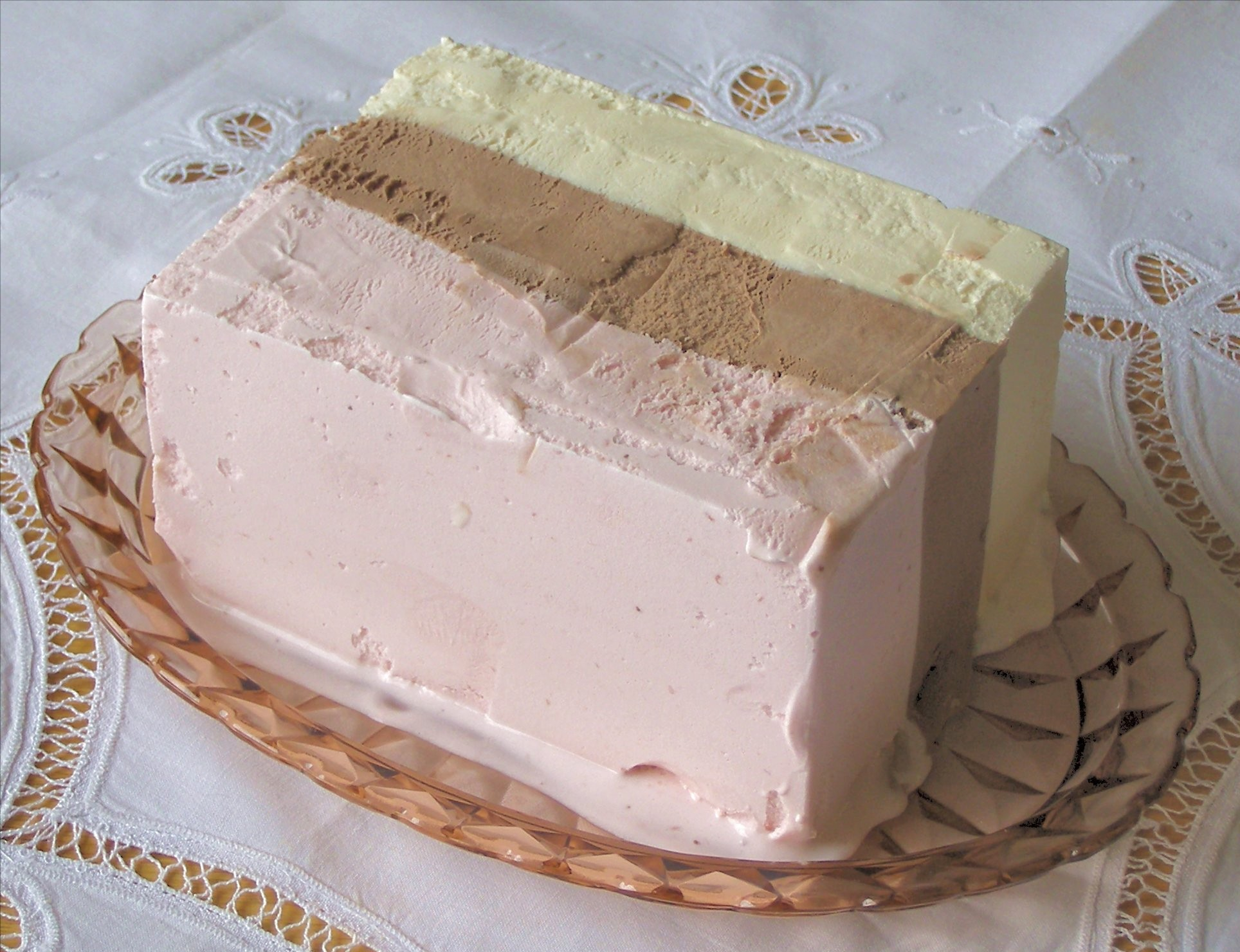
Fürst Pückler ice cream

His name is still used in German cuisine in Fürst-Pückler-Eis (Prince Pückler ice cream), a Neapolitan style combination of strawberry, vanilla and chocolate ice cream. It was named in his honour by Royal Prussian court cook Louis Ferdinand Jungius in 1839.

In Roberto Bolaño's novel 2666 the dessert named after Fürst Pückler is mentioned as an example of one's reputation being defined unexpectedly by accomplishments of lesser significance.

=== Orders and decorations ===
- Kingdom of Prussia:
  - Grand Cross of the Order of the Red Eagle
  - Knight of the Royal Order of the Crown, 1st Class
  - Grand Commander's Cross of the Royal House Order of Hohenzollern
  - Knight of Honour of the Johanniter Order
- Kingdom of Hanover: Commander of the Royal Guelphic Order, 1st Class
- Kingdom of Bavaria: Grand Cross of the Merit Order of the Bavarian Crown, 1818
- French Empire: Officer of the Legion of Honour
- Russian Empire: Knight of the Order of St. Vladimir, 3rd Class
- Saxe-Weimar-Eisenach: Grand Cross of the Order of the White Falcon, 22 February 1850
- Sweden: Commander Grand Cross of the Order of the Polar Star, 6 April 1819

== See also ==
- Schloss Altenstein

== Sources ==
- Bowman, Peter James (2010). The Fortune Hunter: A German Prince in Regency England. Oxford: Signal Books. Archived from the original on 2011-07-18.
- Brennan, Flora (trans.), Puckler's Progress: The Adventures of Prince Pückler-Muskau in England, Wales and Ireland as told in letters to his former wife, 1826-9 (Collins, 1987)
- Ludmilla Assing-Grimelli, ed., Pückler-Muskaus Briefwechsel und Tagebücher ("Pückler-Muskau's letters and diaries", 9 vols., Hamburg 1873–1876, reprinted Bern 1971)
- Ludmilla Assing, Fürst Hermann von Pückler-Muskau, 1873
- Eduard Petzold, Fürst Hermann von Pückler-Muskau in seiner Bedeutung für die bildende Gartenkunst ("Prince Hermann von Pückler-Muskau - his impact on landscape gardening"), 1874
- Chevalier Rafael de Weryha-Wysoczański, Strategien des Privaten. Zum Landschaftspark von Humphry Repton und Fürst Pückler, Berlin 2004
