= Dabo Hana =

Woreda or district of Ethiopia

Dabo Hana is one of the woredas in the Oromia Region of Ethiopia. It was separated from Bedele woreda. The major town is Kone.

== Demographics ==
The 2007 national census reported a total population for this woreda of 41,285, of whom 20,471 were men and 20,814 were women; 4,169 or 10.1% of its population were urban dwellers. The majority of the inhabitants practised Ethiopian Orthodox Christianity, with 61.66% of the population reporting they observed this belief, while 29.13% of the population said they were Protestant, and 7.51% were Moslem.
