= Chora (woreda) =

Woreda or district of Ethiopia

Coordinates: 8°20′N 36°15′E

Chora is one of the woredas in the Oromia Region of Ethiopia. Part of the Illubabor Zone, Chora is bordered on the south by the Jimma Zone, on the west by Yayu, on the northwest by Supena Sodo, on the north by Dega, and on the east by Bedele. The major town in Chora is Kumbabe.

Coffee is an important cash crop of this woreda. Over 50 square kilometers are planted with this crop.

== Demographics ==
The 2007 national census reported a total population for this woreda of 100,506, of whom 49,784 were men and 50,722 were women; 7,715 or 7.68% of its population were urban dwellers. The majority of the inhabitants were Moslem, with 61.1% of the population reporting they observed this belief, while 25.11% practised Ethiopian Orthodox Christianity, and 13.66% of the population said they were Protestant.

Based on figures published by the Central Statistical Agency in 2005, this woreda has an estimated total population of 318,483, of whom 160,504 are men and 157,979 are women; 9,545 or 8.06% of its population are urban dwellers, which is less than the Zone average of 12%. With an estimated area of 947.19 square kilometers, Chora has an estimated population density of 125.1 people per square kilometer, which is greater than the Zone average of 72.3.

The 1994 national census reported a total population for this woreda of 84,617 in 18,027 households, of whom 41,558 were men and 43,059 women; 5,337 or 6.31% of its population were urban dwellers at the time. The three largest ethnic groups reported in Chora were the Oromo (86.74%), the Amhara (10.52%), and the Tigrayan (1.87%); all other ethnic groups made up 0.87% of the population. Oromiffa was spoken as a first language by 88.07%, 9.82% Amharic, and 1.71% Tigrinya; the remaining 0.4% spoke all other primary languages reported. The majority of the inhabitants were Muslim, with 73.88% of the population reporting they practiced that belief, while 21.24% of the population said they embraced Ethiopian Orthodox Christianity, and 3.98% were Protestant.
