= Gechi =

Ethiopian administrative division

Coordinates: 8°20′N 36°40′E

Gechi is one of the woredas in the Oromia Region of Ethiopia. Part of the Buno Bedele Zone, Gechi is bordered on the south by Didessa, on the east by the Jimma Zone, on the north by Bedele, and on the east by the Didessa River which separates it from the Jimma Zone. Gechi town is the administrative center of Gechi woreda. Borecha woreda was part of Gechi.

Coffee is an important cash crop of this woreda. Between 20 and 50 square kilometers are planted with this crop.

This woreda was selected by the Ministry of Agriculture and Rural Development in 2004 as one of several areas for voluntary resettlement for farmers from overpopulated areas. Gechi became the new home for a total of 17,395 heads of households and 2048 total family members.

== Demographics ==
The 2007 national census reported a total population for this woreda of 70,478, of whom 35,307 were men and 35,171 were women; 5,442 or 7.72% of its population were urban dwellers. The majority of the inhabitants were Moslem, with 87.7% of the population reporting they observed this belief, while 10.58% of the population said they practised Ethiopian Orthodox Christianity, and 1.66% were Protestant.

Based on figures published by the Central Statistical Agency in 2005, this woreda has an estimated total population of 116,849, of whom 59,426 are men and 57,423 are women; 7,811 or 6.68% of its population are urban dwellers, which is less than the Zone average of 12%. With an estimated area of 1,400.47 square kilometers, Gechi has an estimated population density of 83.4 people per square kilometer, which is greater than the Zone average of 72.3.

The 1994 national census reported a total population for this woreda of 83,723, of whom 41,322 were men and 42,401 women; 4,369 or 5.22% of its population were urban dwellers at the time. The two largest ethnic groups reported in Gechi were the Oromo (96.59%), and the Amhara (2.3%); all other ethnic groups made up 1.11% of the population. Oromiffa was spoken as a first language by 97.16%, and 2.09% spoke Amharic; the remaining 0.75% spoke all other primary languages reported. The majority of the inhabitants were Muslim, with 90.33% of the population reporting they practiced that belief, while 9.24% of the population said they professed Ethiopian Orthodox Christianity.
