= Schloss Muskau =

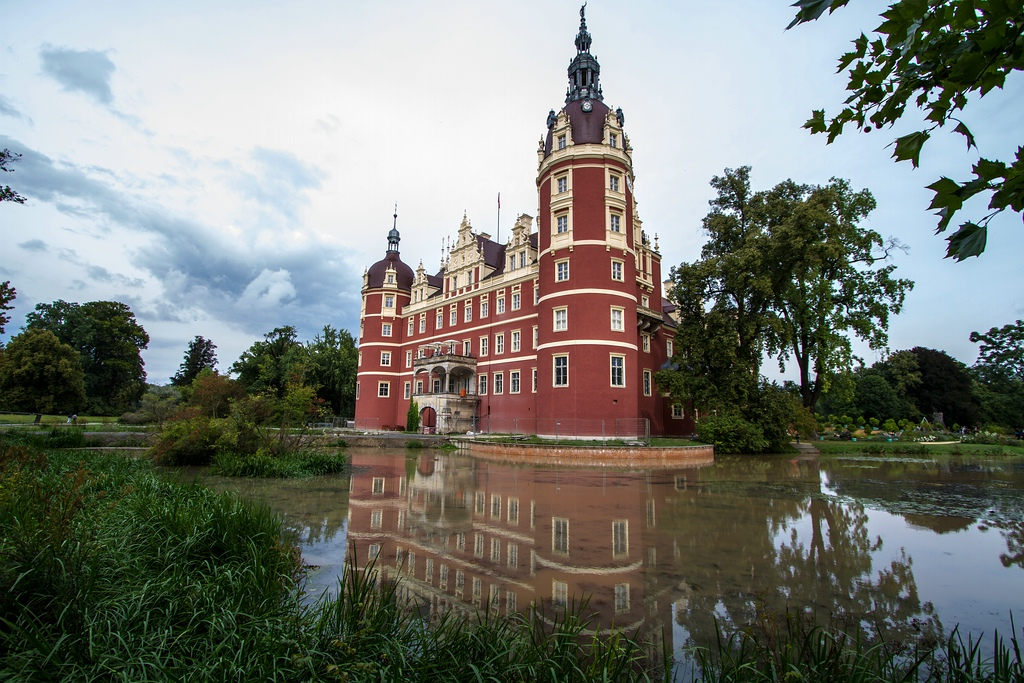
- Main building, Neues Schloss

- Location within Germany

General information
- Architectural style: Neo-Renaissance
- Location: Bad Muskau, Germany
- Coordinates: 51°33′01″N 14°43′36″E

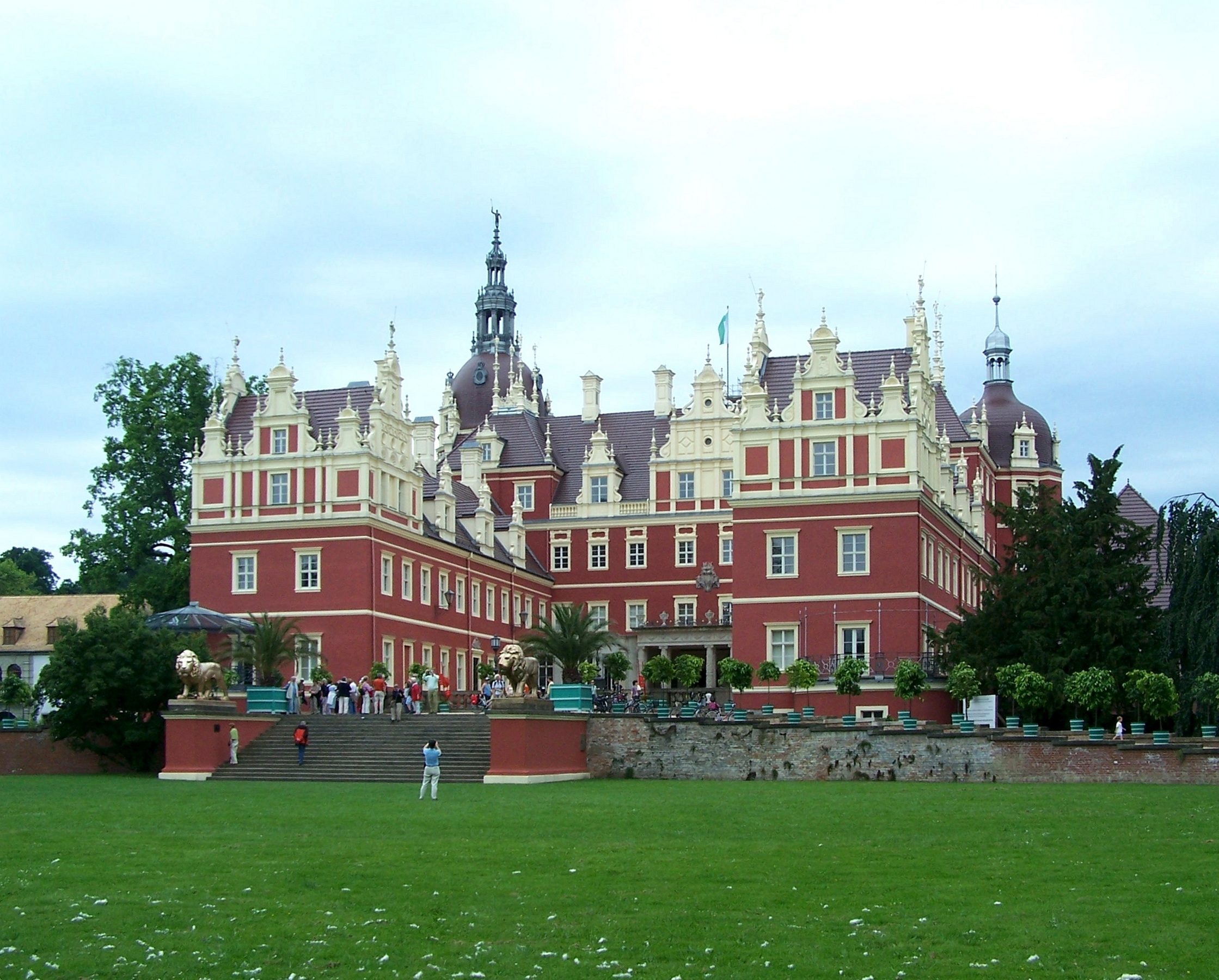
View from the Schlosswiese

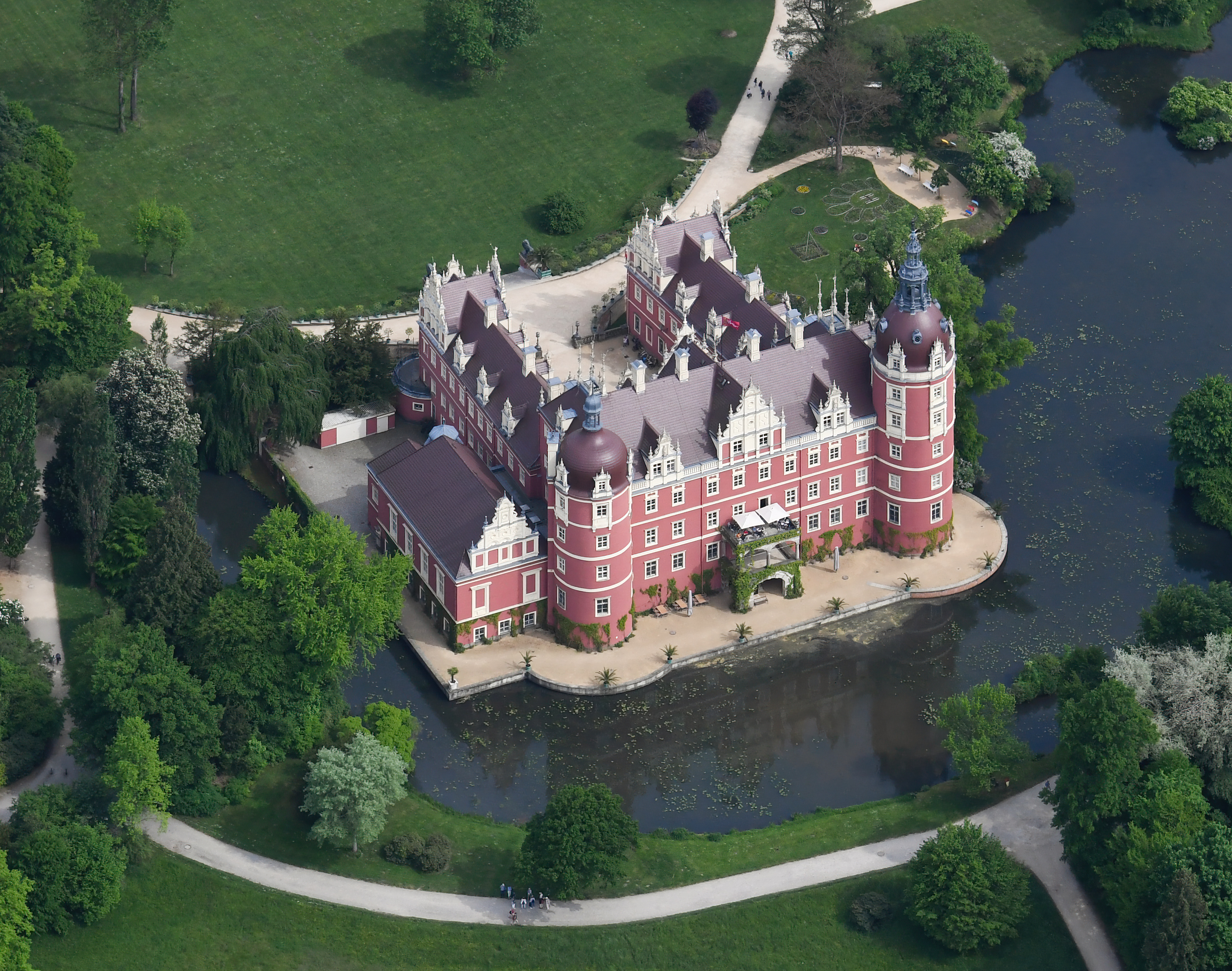
Aerial view

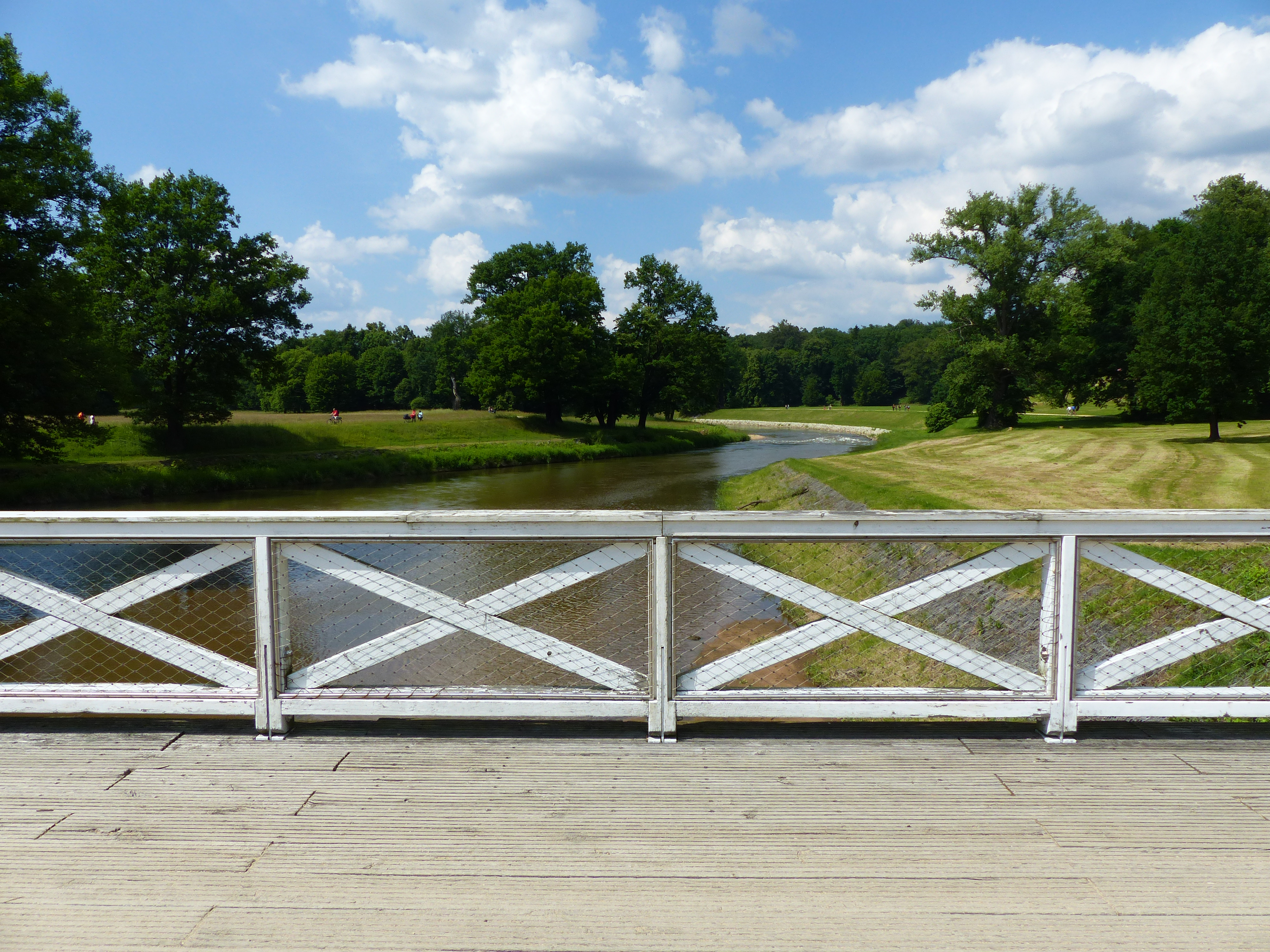
Bridge over the Neisse in Muskau Park

Schloss Muskau (Muskau palace) is a schloss in the Görlitz district in the state of Saxony, Germany. It is located in an extended park, the Muskau Park, since July 2004 a UNESCO World Heritage Site. The building complex was developed over a long period. The present main building, called Neues Schloss (New Palace), was built in the 19th century in Neo-Renaissance style, looted and burnt down by the Red Army in 1945, and after decades as a ruin, was reconstructed until 2013.

== Geography ==
Muskau Park is the largest and one of the most famous English landscape gardens in Central Europe, stretching along both sides of the German–Polish border on the Lusatian Neisse.

== History ==
The park was laid out from 1815 onwards at the behest of Prince Hermann von Pückler-Muskau (1785–1871). Pückler reconstructed the medieval fortress as the "New Castle", the compositional centre of the park, with a network of paths radiating from it and a pleasure ground influenced by the ideas of Humphry Repton, whose son John Adey worked at Muskau from 1822 on. The extensions went on until 1845, when Pückler because of his enormous debts was constrained to sell the patrimony. The next year it was acquired by Prince Frederick of the Netherlands, who employed Eduard Petzold, Pückler's disciple and a well-known landscape gardener, to complete his design. Upon his death in 1881, he was succeeded by his daughter Princess Marie, who sold the estates to the Count von Arnim.

== Literature ==
- Hermann Graf von Arnim / Willi A. Boelcke: Muskau – Standesherrschaft zwischen Spree und Neiße. Frankfurt am Main, Berlin 1992. ISBN 3-549-06695-3.
- Sophie Gräfin von Arnim: Bilder aus Muskaus Vergangenheit. vol. 1,2. Görlitz 1934/35, Bd 3. München 1973.
- Regina Barufke / Ekkehard Brucks / Ellen Kollewe / Helmut Rippl: Fürst Pückler-Park Bad Muskau – ein europäischer Landschaftspark. Beiträge zur Stadt- und Parkgeschichte Nr. 15 mit zwei Kartenbeilagen. Bad Muskau 1998. ISBN 3-930625-09-1.
- Willi A. Boelke: Verfassungswandel und Wirtschaftsstruktur. Die mittelalterliche und neuzeitliche Territorialgeschichte ostmitteldeutscher Adelsherrschaften als Beispiel. Würzburg 1969.
- Lars-Arne Dannenberg, Matthias Donath: Schlösser in der östlichen Oberlausitz. Meißen 2009.
- Joachim Fait, Detlef Karg (Hrsg.): Hermann Ludwig Heinrich Fürst von Pückler-Muskau. Gartenkunst und Denkmalpflege. Weimar 1989. ISBN 3-74000089-9.
- Hermann Friedrich von Knothe: Geschichte des Oberlausitzer Adels und seiner Güter vom 13. bis gegen Ende des 16. Jahrhunderts. Spitzkunnersdorf 2008. ISBN 3-933827-94-9.
- Erich Merkle (ed.): Chronik von Stadt und Park Bad Muskau. Weißwasser 1997. ISBN 3-932541-00-6.
- Hermann von Pückler-Muskau: Andeutungen über Landschaftsgärtnerei verbunden mit der Beschreibung ihrer praktischen Anwendung in Muskau, [1834], Stuttgart 1977. ISBN 3-421-01795-6.
- Helmut Rippl (Hr.): Der Parkschöpfer Pückler-Muskau. Das gartenkünstlerische Erbe des Fürsten Hermann Ludwig Heinrich von Pückler-Muskau. Weimar 1995. ISBN 3-7400-0994-2.
- Stiftung „Fürst-Pückler-Park Bad Muskau“ (ed.): Fürst Pückler. Parkomanie in Muskau und Branitz. Ein Führer durch seine Anlagen in Sachsen, Brandenburg und Thüringen. Hamburg 2006. ISBN 3-928119-99-0.
