= Buno Bedele Zone =

Administrative division of Ethiopia

Buno Bedele (also Buno Bedelle; Oromo: Buunoo Beddellee) is one of the zones of the Oromia Region in Ethiopia. Located in western Oromia, Buno Bedele is bordered on the west by the Ilu Aba Bora Zone, on the north by the East Wollega Zone and West Wollega Zone and on the east and south by the Jimma Zone. Its administrative center is Bedele.

The Buno Bedele was created by 9 districts and 1 town in March 2016. The Zone covers 5,856.5030 square kilometres of which 1,126.64 square kilometres are covered by forests.

== Demographics ==
Based on the 2007 Census conducted by the Central Statistical Agency of Ethiopia, this Zone has a total population 829,663.
