= Borecha =

Woreda from the Oromia region of Ethiopia

Borecha is one of the woredas in the Oromia Region of Ethiopia. It was separated from Gechi woreda. Yanfu is the major town in Borecha.

== Demographics ==
The 2007 national census reported a total population for this woreda of 73,708, of whom 37,360 were men and 36,348 were women; 2,726 or 3.7% of its population were urban dwellers. The majority of the inhabitants were Moslem, with 94.96% of the population reporting they observed this belief, while 4.45% of the population said they practised Ethiopian Orthodox Christianity.
