= Willi A. Boelcke =

German economic and social historian (1929–2022)

Willi Alfred Boelcke was a German Economic and Social Historian, journalist, prolific author, essayist and retired university professor. The focus of his research and output has been on Germany during the nineteenth and twentieth centuries.

== Life ==
Willi Alfred Boelcke was born in Berlin-Lankwitz, a suburb in the southern part of the Berlin conurbation. He grew up in the Berlin area. His father was a businessman-entrepreneur. After completion of his school career he attended, starting in 1949, both the recently rebranded Humboldt University in the Soviet occupation zone/East Berlin and its recently inaugurated rival institution in the U.S. occupation zone / West Berlin. He studied History, Germanistics, Economics and Jurisprudence, graduating with his first degree in 1953.

His doctorate, from the Humboldt University, and received in return for work on the "feudal overlordship in Upper Lusatia with a particular focus on economic, social and legal history in the manorial villages of East Elbia during the seventeenth and eighteenth centuries", followed just two years later. He then completed a training for work with the senior archives service and worked in a management position with the (East) German National Archives Department in Potsdam. During the later 1950s he was able to access and make a thorough study of the detailed records of the daily meetings that Joseph Goebbels conducted with his top ministry officials during the twelve Hitler years. After Boelcke left the Archives Service and Potsdam in 1959 and crossed to the west this research would provide material for a number of books.

Between 1959 and 1962 Boelcke was in receipt of a research scholarship for the Bonn-based German Research Foundation ("Deutsche Forschungsgemeinschaft" / DFG). During the 1950s the political administrative borders between East and West Berlin were progressively reinforced with physical barriers, and it became harder for Berliners to view their city as a single entity. Nevertheless, until the sudden appearance in August 1961 of the Berlin Wall it was not impossible for East Germans to cross over to West Berlin and from there to make their way to a new life in West Germany in pursuit of greater freedom and prosperity. Between 1953 and 1961 several million East Germans did just that, leaving behind them an intensifying labour shortage. At some point between 1959 and (probably) 1961, Willi Alfred Boelcke became one of the intra-German emigrants. Sources are silent as to the extent and duration of his debriefing. In 1967 he received his habilitation (higher university degree) from the University of Stuttgart-Hohenheim. His degree topic this time was "Constitutional changes and economic structures" covering the medieval and modern periods, taking examples from the traditionally aristocratically ruled central German lands covering approximately the modern territories identified during much of the twentieth century as Thuringia and Saxony. Other things being equal, the habilitation opened the way to a lifelong career in the West German universities sector. He accepted a professorship as Economic and Social Historian at the University of Stuttgart-Hohenheim in 1969 and remained in the post for more than a quarter of a century, until 1994.

== Works ==
Willi Boelcke's academic work is summarised in his published books and articles, of which there are more than 100, including 20 books. Their scope can be classified into four distinct fields:

- The history of Middle Germany
- The history of Baden-Württemberg
- The economic history - principally of Germany - of the nineteenth and twentieth centuries
- Historical dimensions of propaganda and mass media

=== Output (selection) ===
- Die feudale Gutsherrschaft in der Oberlausitz unter besonderer Berücksichtigung des 17. und 18. Jahrhunderts. Ein Beitrag zur Wirtschafts-, Sozial- und Rechtsgeschichte des ostelbischen Rittergutsdorfes. Phil. Diss. HU Berlin 1955.
- Krupp und die Hohenzollern, Rütten u. Loening, Berlin 1956.
- Bauer und Gutsherr in der Oberlausitz, Domowina, Bautzen 1957.
- Der deutsche Überfall auf die Sowjetunion 1941 im Spiegel der Verwaltungsgeschichte, In: Archivmitteilungen 7 (1957), S. 141–150.
- Kriegspropaganda 1939–1941. Geheime Ministerkonferenzen im Reichspropagandaministerium. DVA, Stuttgart 1966, DNB:457297204.
- Wollt ihr den totalen Krieg? Die geheimen Goebbels-Konferenzen 1939–1943, DVA, Stuttgart 1967.
- Wege und Forschungen der Agrargeschichte, DLG-Verlag, Frankfurt am Main 1967.
- Die archivalischen Grundlagen der deutschen Rundfunkgeschichte, 1968.
- Verfassungswandel und Wirtschaftsstruktur, Holzner, Würzburg 1969.
- Facsimile Querschnitt durch Signal (jointly with Hans Dollinger), 1969.
- Deutschlands Rüstung im Zweiten Weltkrieg – Hitlers Konferenzen mit Albert Speer 1942–1945, Akademische Verlagsgesellschaft Athenaion, Frankfurt am Main 1969, DNB:456445579.
- Krupp und die Hohenzollern in Dokumenten. Krupp-Korrespondenz mit Kaisern, Kabinettschefs und Ministern 1850–1918. Akademische Verlagsgesellschaft Athenaion, Frankfurt am Main 1970. (Erweiterte Ausgabe des Buches von 1956).
- Goebbels und die Kundgebung im Berliner Sportpalast vom 18. Februar 1943. In: Jahrbuch für die Geschichte Mittel- und Ostdeutschlands 19 (1970), pp. 234–255.
- Die Waffengeschäfte des Dritten Reiches mit Brasilien. In: Tradition 16 (1971), pp. 177–200, 280–287.
- Das "Seehaus“ in Berlin-Wannsee. In: Jahrbuch für die Geschichte Mittel- und Ostdeutschlands 23 (1974), pp. 231–269.
- Wandlungen der deutschen Agrarwirtschaft in der Folge des Ersten Weltkriegs. In: Francia 3 (1975), pp. 498–532.
- Die Macht des Radios. Weltpolitik und Auslandsrundfunk 1924–1976. Ullstein, Frankfurt a. M. 1977, ISBN 3-550-07365-8.
- So kam das Meer zu uns. Die preußisch-deutsche Kriegsmarine in Übersee, 1822–1914, Ullstein, Frankfurt a. M./Berlin-West/Wien 1981.
- Der Schwarzmarkt 1945–1948. Vom Überleben nach dem Kriege, Georg Westermann Verlag, Braunschweig 1986, ISBN 3-07-508814-5.
- Wirtschaftsgeschichte Baden-Württembergs von den Römern bis heute, Theiss, Stuttgart 1987.
- Wirtschaft und Sozialsituationen, In: Otto Borst (Hrsg.): Das Dritte Reich in Baden und Württemberg, Theiss, Stuttgart 1988, pp. 29–45.
- Sozialgeschichte Baden-Württembergs 1800–1989, Kohlhammer, Stuttgart 1989.
- Millionäre in Württemberg. Herkunft – Aufstieg – Traditionen, DVA, Stuttgart 1997, ISBN 3-421-05110-0 (enthält Nachdruck: Rudolf Martin: Jahrbuchs des Vermögens und Einkommens der Millionäre in Württemberg mit Hohenzollern, 1914).
