= Bedele =

Bedele በዴሌ
- Town
- Location within Ethiopia
- Coordinates: 8°27′N 36°21′E
- Country: Ethiopia
- Region: Oromia
- Zone: Buno Bedele Zone

Population (2007)
  - Total: 19,517
- Time zone: UTC+3 (EAT)
- Climate: Cwb

Bedele (also called Buno Bedele) is a town and separate Aanaa in south-western Ethiopia. Located in the Buno Bedele Zone of the Oromia Region, this town has a longitude and latitude of 8°27′N 36°21′E and an elevation between 2,012–2,162 metres (6,601–7,093 ft) above sea level.

== History ==
Ras Tessema Nadew made his capital near Bedele in the early 1900s. Henry Savage Landor passed through the town in 1906. The map attached to C. W. Gwynn's account of his 1908/09 triangulation survey of southern Ethiopia shows that Bedele had a telegraph station, connected by way of Gore. The Buno Bedele Health Center was built in 1966 with a majority of Swedish donations.

The road connecting Bedele to Agaro, 96 kilometres (60 mi) long, was completed in 1968 at a cost of 12 million dollars (Ethiopian), by the French company Razel Frères. Construction on a road to Metu began around 1970.

In February 2009, Regional President Abadula Gemeda laid the cornerstone for a new cultural center in Bedele. At the same time, he officially opened the new technical and vocational college in the town.

== Bedele Brewery ==
Bedele is the headquarters for the Bedele Brewery. Founded in 1993, Bedele is a formerly government-owned corporation, producing about 75 million bottles of beer each year for domestic and export customers; it was bought by Heineken in August 2011.

== Demographics ==
The 2007 national census reported a total population for Bedele of 19,517, of whom 9,837 were men and 9,680 were women. The majority of the inhabitants practised Ethiopian Orthodox Christianity, with 52.9% of the population reporting they observed this belief, while 24.98% of the population said they were Protestant, and 21.44% were Muslim.

Based on figures from the Central Statistical Agency in 2005, Bedele has an estimated total population of 21,289 of whom 10,556 are men and 10,733 are women. The 1994 census reported this town had a total population of 11,907 of whom 5,725 were males and 6,182 were females. 90% of the residents are ethnic Oromo.
