= List of districts in Oromia =

This is a list of the districts (woredas or aanaas) in the Oromia Region of Ethiopia, according to the Central Statistical Agency.

Oromia Region

Zones of Ethiopia

== List of districts by zone ==
=== Adama Special Zone ===
- Adama

=== Arsi Zone ===
- Aminya
- Aseko
- Asella Town
- Bale Gasegar
- Batu Dugda
- Chole
- Digelu fi Tijo
- Diksis
- Dodota
- Enkelo Wabe
- Gololcha
- Guna
- Hetosa
- Jeju
- Lemo fi bilbilo
- Lode Hetosa
- Merti
- Munesa
- Robe
- Seru
- Sire
- Shirka
- Sude
- Tena
- Tiyo
- Shanan kolu
- Bokoji town
- Diksiis town
- Dhera town

=== Bale Zone ===
- Agafra
- Berbere
- Delo Menna
- Dinsho
- Gasera
- Goba
- Goba Town
- Goro
- Guradamole
- Harena Buluk
- Meda Welabu
- Robe Town
- Sinana

East Bale Zone

- Sawena
- Rayitu
- Legahidha
- Gindhir
- Dawe Qachan
- Dawe sarar
- Gololcha
- Gindhir town

=== Borena Zone ===
- Dillo
- Dire
- Gomole
- Miyo
- Moyale
- Teltele
- Yabelo
- Dubuluq
- Elwaye
- Yabelo town
- Guchi

=== Buno Bedele Zone ===
- Bedele
- Chora
- Dabo
- Chawaka
- Boracha
- Gechi
- Dedesa
- Dega
- Meko
- Badele town

=== East Borena Zone ===
- Arero
- Liban
- Gumi Eeldalo
- Dhaas
- Waacile
- Madda walabu
- Nageellee town
- West Walabu
- Goro dola

=== East Hararghe Zone ===
- Babile
- Badeno
- Chinaksen
- Dadar
- Fedis
- Girawa
- Gola Oda
- Goro Gutu
- Gursum
- Haro Maya
- Jarso
- Kersa
- Kombolcha
- Kurfa Chele
- Malka Balo
- Meyumuluke
- Meta
- Midega Tola
- Kumbi
- Goro muti
- Makanisa Oromoo

=== East Shewa Zone ===
- Adaama
- Ada'a
- Adami Tullu and Jido Kombolcha
- Batu town
- Bishoftu
- Bora
- Boset
- Dugda
- Fentale
- Gimbichu
- Liben
- Lume
- Aqaqi
- Maqi town
- Matahara town

=== East Welega Zone ===
- Bonaya Boshe
- Diga
- Gida Kiremu
- Gobu Seyo
- Gudeya Bila
- Guto Gida
- Haro Limmu
- Ibantu
- Jimma Arjo
- Leka Dulecha
- Limmu
- Naqamte
- Nunu Kumba
- Sasiga
- Sibu Sire
- Wama Hagalo
- Wayu Tuka
- Angar Guutee town

=== Guji Zone ===
- Adola rede
- Adola Town
- Adola wayu
- Aga wayu
- Ana Sora
- Arda jila
- Bore
- Dama
- Girja
- Haro walabu
- Odo Shakiso
- Uraga
- Wadera
- Sabba Boru

=== Horo Guduru Welega Zone ===
- Abaya Chomen
- Abe Dongoro
- Amuru
- Guduru
- Coomman Guduruu
- Hababo Guduru
- Horo
- Jardega Jarte
- Jimma Genete
- Jimma Rare
- Shambu Town
- Horo Bulluq
- Sulala Fincha

=== Illubabor Zone ===
- Ale
- Alge Sache
- Bacho
- Bilo Nopha
- Bure
- Darimu
- Didu
- Doreni
- Halu
- Hurumu
- Metu
- Metu Town
- Nono Sele
- Supena Sodo
- Yayu
- Nadhi Nono

=== Jimma Zone ===
- Agaro Town
- Chora Botor
- Dedo
- Gera
- Gomma
- Guma
- Kersa
- Limmu Sakka
- Limmu Kosa
- Mana
- Omo Nada
- Seka Chekorsa
- Setema
- Shebe Senbo
- Sigmo
- Sokoru
- Botor xolay
- Nadhi Gibe
- Mancho
- Nono Benja
- Omo beyam
- Limu Saka town

=== Jimma Special Zone ===
- Jimma

=== Kelam Welega Zone ===
- Anfillo
- Dale Sedi
- Dale Wabera
- Dembidolo Town
- Gawo Kebe
- Gidami
- Hawa Gelan
- Jimma Horo
- Lalo Kile
- Sayo
- Yemalogi Welele
- Sedi Chenka

=== North Shewa Zone ===
- Abichu fi nya'a
- Aleltu
- Degem
- Dera
- Fiche Town
- Gerar Jarso
- Hidabu Abote
- Jida
- Kembibit
- Kuyu
- Barak (woreda)
- Wara Jarso
- Wuchale
- Yaya Gulele
- Sululta
- Mulo
- Shararo
- Garba Guracha town
- Canco town

=== Southwest Shewa Zone ===
- Amaya
- Becho
- Dawo
- Ilu
- Goro
- Kersa fi Malima
- Seden Sodo
- Sodo Dachi
- Tole
- Waliso
- Waliso Town
- Wanchi
- Sabata Hawas

=== West Arsi Zone ===
- Adaba
- Negele Arsi
- Dodola
- Gedeb Hassasa
- Kofele
- Kokosa
- Qoree
- Naannawa Shashamane
- Nensebo
- Seraro
- Shala
- Heban Arsi
- Kofale town
- Nagele Arsi town
- Wondo

=== West Guji Zone ===
- Bule Hora
- Birbirsa Kojowa
- Kercha
- Abaya
- Suro
- Gelana
- Dugda Dawa
- Hambela Wamena
- Bule Hora
- Karcha town
- Malka Soda

=== West Hararghe Zone ===
- Badessa Town
- Boke
- Oda Bultum
- Chiro Town
- Daru labu
- Doba
- Galamso town
- Gamachis
- Guba Koricha
- Habro
- Shanan dhugo
- Mieso
- Nannawa Chiro
- Tulo
- Gumbi bordode
- Burqa Dhintu
- Mechara michata
- Hawwi Guddina
- ((Anchar Bedeyi))
- Galamso town
- Hirna town

=== West Shewa Zone ===
- Abuna Ginde Beret
- Ada'a Berga
- Ambo Town
- Bako Tibe
- Cheliya
- Dano (woreda)
- Dendi
- Dire Enchini
- Ejerie
- Ejersa Lafo
- Elfata
- Ginde Beret
- Jeldu
- Jibat
- Meta Robi
- Midakegn
- Naannawa Ambo
- Nono
- Toke Kutaye
- Liban Jawi
- Cobii
- Ilu Galan
- Meettaa Walqixxee
- Walmara

=== West Welega Zone ===
- Ayra
- Babo Gambela
- Begi
- Boji Chokorsa
- Boji Dirmaji
- Genji
- Gimbi
- Gimbi Town
- Guliso
- Haru
- Homa
- Jarso
- Kondala
- Kiltu Kara
- Lalo Asabi
- Mana Sibu
- Nejo
- Nole Kaba
- Sayo Nole
- Yubdo
- Mandi town

== Defunct districts/woredas ==
- Ada'a Chukala (Baha Shewa Zone)
- Adolana Wadera (Guji Zone)
- Amuru Jarte (Horo Gudru Welega Zone)
- Ayra Guliso (West Welega Zone)
- Bako (West Shewa Zone)
- Bedele (Illubabor Zone)
- Bekoji (Arsi Zone)
- Berehna Aleltu (Oromia Special Zone Surrounding Finfinne)
- Bila Seyo (East Welega Zone)
- Boji (West Welega Zone)
- Chiro (West Hararghe Zone)
- Dale Lalo (Kelem Welega Zone)
- Diga Leka (East Welega Zone)
- Dodotafi Sire (Arsi Zone)
- Dugda Bora (Baha Shewa Zone)
- Gaserana Gololcha (Bale Zone)
- Gawo Dale (Kelem Welega Zone)
- Gola Odana Meyumuluke (East Hararghe Zone)
- Guder (West Shewa Zone)
- Guto Wayu (East Welega Zone)
- Hagere Mariam (Borena Zone)
- Hawa Welele (Kelem Welega Zone)
- Jimma Gidami (Kelem Welega Zone)
- Jimma Horo (East Welega Zone)
- Mennana Harena Buluk (Bale Zone)
- Metu (Illubabor Zone)
- Mulona Sululta (Oromia Special Zone Surrounding Finfinne)
- Sinanana Dinsho (Bale Zone)
- Walisona Goro (Southwest Shewa Zone)
- Wama Bonaya (East Welega Zone)
- Wuchalena Jido (Kaba Shewa Zone)
- Yaya Gulelena Debre Liban
- Yaya Gulele fi liban (Kaba Shewa Zone)

== See also ==
- Districts of Ethiopia
