= Guto Wayu =

Former district in Oromia Region, Ethiopia

Coordinates: 9°10′N 36°45′E

Guto Wayu was one of the 180 woredas in the Oromia of Ethiopia. It was divided between Guto Gida, Wayu Tuka woredas and Nekemte town. Part of the East Welega Zone, Guto Wayu was bordered on the south by Nunu Kumba, on the southwest by Jimma Arjo and Diga Leka, on the west by Sasiga, on the northwest by Limmu and Gida Kiremu, on the northeast by Bila Seyo, on the east by Sibu Sire, and on the southeast by Wama Bonaya. The administrative center of the woreda was Nekemte, which is also the Zonal capital; other towns included Gute.

== Overview ==
The major peaks of this woreda are Mounts Tuka (3141 meters), Komto and Daleti. Rivers include the Eya, Uke, Loko, Beseka, Wachu, Adiyya, Tato and Oda. A survey of the land in this woreda shows that 55.7% is arable or cultivable, 21.6% pasture, 8.5% forest, and 14.2% other. Komto and Chirri State Forests cover about 21.56 square kilometers of land. Coffee is an important cash crop of this woreda; between 20 and 50 square kilometers are planted with this crop.

Industry in the woreda includes 45 grain mills, 12 edible oil mills, 5 bakeries, 6 wood-working shops and 1 metalworks. There were 18 Farmers Associations with 15,533 members and 15 Farmers Service Cooperatives with 11,505 members. Guto Wayu has 86 kilometers all-weather road, for an average of road density of 64.9 kilometers per 1000 square kilometers. About 28.5% of the total population has access to drinking water.

This woreda was selected by the Ministry of Agriculture and Rural Development in 2003 as one of several areas for voluntary resettlement for farmers from overpopulated areas. Together with Gida Kiremu and Jimma Arjo, Guto Wayu became the new home for a total of 8435 heads of households and 31,781 total family members.

== Demographics ==
Based on figures published by the Central Statistical Agency in 2005, this woreda has an estimated total population of 238,453, of whom 120,142 are men and 118,311 women; 85,637 or 35.91% of its population are urban dwellers, which is greater than the Zone average of 13.9%. With an estimated area of 1,324.22 square kilometers, Guto Wayu has an estimated population density of 180.1 people per square kilometer, which is greater than the Zone average of 81.4.

The 1994 national census reported a total population for this woreda of 159,113, of whom 78,548 were men and 80,565 women; 47,891 or 30.1% of its population were urban dwellers at the time. The three largest ethnic groups reported in Guto Wayu were the Oromo (90.57%), the Amhara (7.15%), and the Tigray (0.9%); all other ethnic groups made up 1.38% of the population. Oromiffa was spoken as a first language by 91.34%, 7.16% spoke Amharic, and 0.78% spoke Tigrinya; the remaining 1.11% spoke all other primary languages reported. The majority of the inhabitants were Ethiopian Orthodox Christianity, with 58.68% of the population reporting they observed this belief, while 30.37% of the population said they were Protestant, 5.98% were Moslem, and 4.24% were Roman Catholic.
