= Guto Gida =

One of the Aanaas in the Oromia Regional state of Ethiopia

Guto Gida is one of the Aanaas in the Oromia of Ethiopia. It is part of the East Welega Zone. It was separated from Guto Wayu Aanaa. It is bounded by Wayu Tuka in the east, Sasiga and Diga in the west, Gida Ayana and Gudeya Bila in the north and Leka Dulecha to the south.

== Demographics ==
The 2007 national census reported a total population for this woreda of 89,906, of whom 45,810 were men and 44,096 were women; none of its population were urban dwellers. The majority of the inhabitants observed Protestantism, with 53.11% reporting that as their religion, while 30.16% observed Ethiopian Orthodox Christianity, and 14.61% were Moslem.
