= Bila Seyo =

District in Oromia Region, Ethiopia

Coordinates: 9°10′N 37°00′E

Bila Seyo was one of the 180 woredas in the Oromia of Ethiopia. It was divided between Gobu Seyo and Gudeya Bila woredas. Part of the East Welega Zone, Bila Seyo was bordered on the south by Wama Bonaya, on the southwest by Sibu Sire, on the west by Guto Wayu, on the north by Abe Dongoro, on the northeast by Jimma Horo, and on the east by the West Shewa Zone. The administrative center of the woreda was Ano; other towns in Bila Seyo included Bila and Jare.

== Overview ==
The altitude of this woreda ranges from 1300 to 2810 meters above sea level. Peaks include Mount Uko, Mount Buke, Mount Deleta and Mount Gushis. Rivers include the Aleltu, Kurchi, Gorochan and Gibe. A survey of the land in this woreda shows that 38.7% is arable or cultivable, 9.6% pasture, 39.5% forest, and the remaining 12.2% is considered marshy, mountainous or otherwise unusable. A state forest about 250 square kilometers in size is located in this woreda. Cash crops include niger seeds and pepper.

Industry in the woreda includes 12 grain mills; iron and sandstone are extracted. There were 15 Farmers Associations with 17,061 members and 13 Farmers Service Cooperatives with 6826 members. Bila Seyo has 53 kilometers of all-weather road, for an average of road density of 46.7 kilometers per 1000 square kilometers. About 15.6% of the total population has access to drinking water. There are 12 primary schools in this woreda, four providing education for grades 1-4 and eight providing education for grades 1-8, and one secondary education school, providing education for grades 9-10. Health services are provided by two clinics and four health posts; these facilities are ill-equipped and under-staffed, making them insufficient to reach the entire population.

This woreda was selected by the Ministry of Agriculture and Rural Development in 2004 as one of several areas for voluntary resettlement for farmers from overpopulated areas in the Misraq Welega Zone. Together with Amuru Jarte, Gida Kiremu, Ibantu, Jimma Arjo, Limmu and Nunu Kumba, Bila Seyo became the new home for a total of 22,462 heads of households and 112,310 total family members.

== Demographics ==
Based on figures published by the Central Statistical Agency in 2005, this woreda has an estimated total population of 96,451, of whom 49,624 are men and 46,827 are women; 1,148 or 1.19% of its population are urban dwellers, which is less than the Zone average of 13.9%. With an estimated area of 1,134.22 square kilometers, Bila Seyo has an estimated population density of 85 people per square kilometer, which is less than the Zone average of 81.4.

The 1994 national census reported a total population for this woreda of 68,273, of whom 33,271 were men and 35,002 women; 6,411 or 9.39% of its population were urban dwellers at the time. The two largest ethnic groups reported in Bila Seyo were the Oromo (86.65%), and the Amhara (12.88%); all other ethnic groups made up 0.47% of the population. Oromiffa was spoken as a first language by 89.04%, and 10.7% spoke Amharic; the remaining 0.26% spoke all other primary languages reported. The majority of the inhabitants were Ethiopian Orthodox Christianity, with 74.17% of the population reporting they observed that belief, while 11.51% of the population said they were Protestant, 9.3% were Moslem, and 4.65% practiced traditional beliefs.
