= Mulatu Teshome =

President of Ethiopia from 2013 to 2018

- ሙላቱ ተሾመ
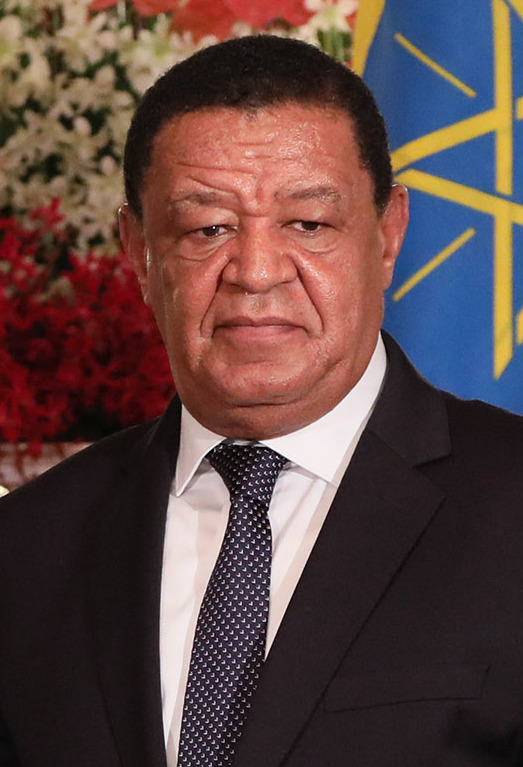
- Mulatu in 2019

President of Ethiopia
- In office 7 October 2013 – 25 October 2018
- Prime Minister: Hailemariam Desalegn; Abiy Ahmed
- Preceded by: Girma Wolde-Giorgis
- Succeeded by: Sahle-Work Zewde

Speaker of the House of Federation
- In office 10 October 2002 – 10 October 2005
- Prime Minister: Meles Zenawi
- Preceded by: Almaz Meko
- Succeeded by: Degefe Bula

Minister of Agriculture and Rural Development
- In office 17 October 2001 – 1 July 2003
- Prime Minister: Meles Zenawi
- Preceded by: Mengistu Hulluka
- Succeeded by: Addisu Legesse

Personal details
- Born: 1957 (age 68–69) Arjo, East Welega, Ethiopian Empire
- Party: Oromo Peoples' Democratic Organization (EPRDF; until 2019)
- Spouse: Meaza Abraham
- Education: Peking University; Beijing Language and Culture University; The Fletcher School of Law and Diplomacy

Mulatu Teshome Wirtu (Oromo: Mulaatuu Tashoome Wirtuu; Amharic: ሙላቱ ተሾመ ውርቱ; born 1957) is an Ethiopian politician who was president of Ethiopia from 2013 to 2018.

== Biography ==
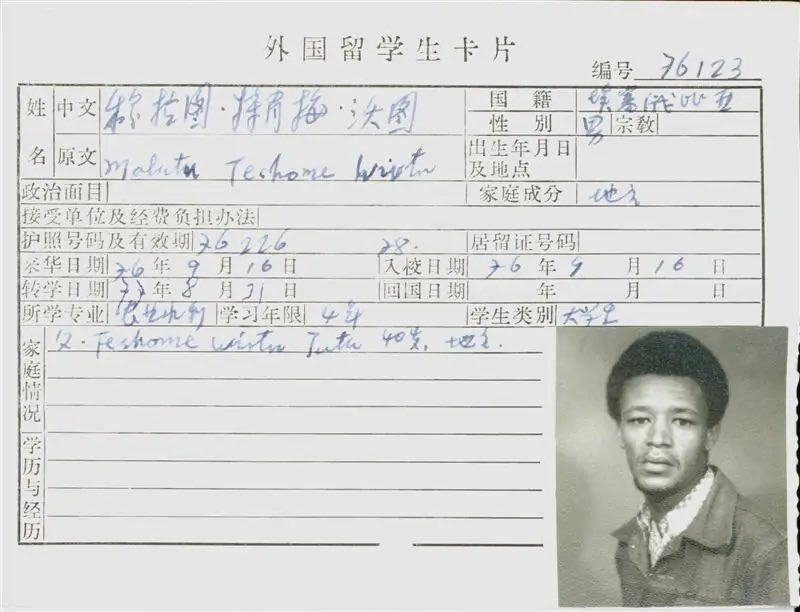
International student card of Mulatu Teshome at Peking University

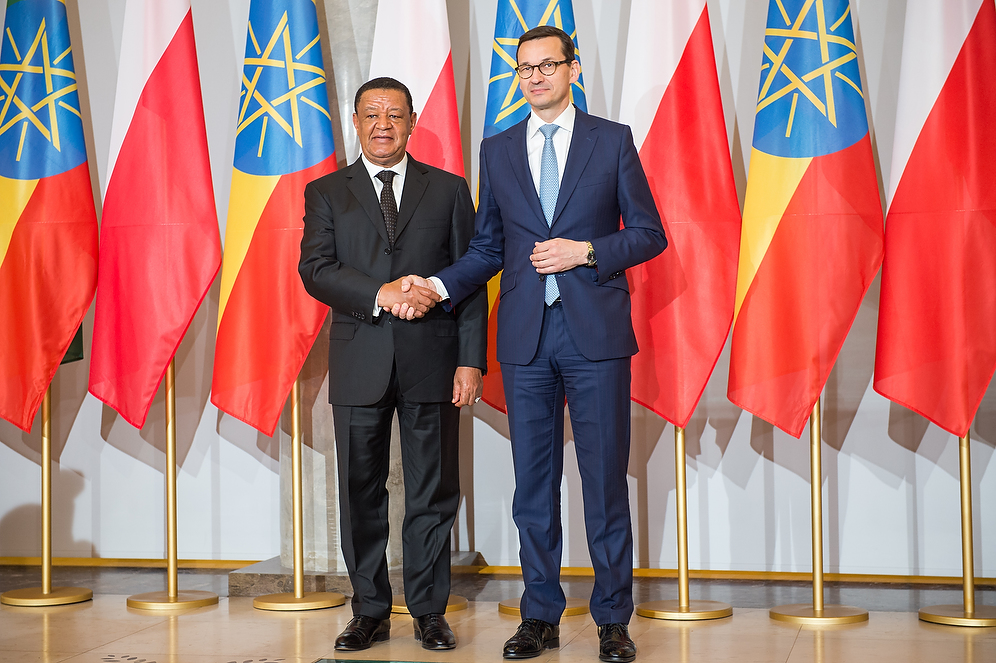
President Mulatu Teshome meets with Polish Prime Minister Mateusz Morawiecki in Warsaw, 25 April 2018

Mulatu was born in the town of Arjo in Welega Province. He was educated in China, receiving his bachelor's degree in philosophy of political economy and doctorate in international politics at Peking University. He received his Master of Arts in Law and Diplomacy from The Fletcher School of Law and Diplomacy at Tufts University in 1990. He taught at some "foreign universities and institutions", according to Speaker Abadula Gemeda.

In the mid-1990s he was Deputy Minister of Economic Development and Cooperation under Minister Girma Birru, and he was appointed as Minister of Agriculture in 2001. He was also Speaker of the House of Federation from 2002 to 2005. He served as Ethiopia's Ambassador to China, Japan, Turkey, and Azerbaijan.

While serving as Ambassador to Turkey, he was elected as President of Ethiopia by a unanimous parliamentary vote on 7 October 2013. Girma Seifu of the Unity for Democracy and Justice, the sole opposition member of parliament, welcomed his election. Like his predecessors Girma Wolde-Giorgis and Negasso Gidada, he is Oromo.

Mulatu is married and has one son.

Political offices
Preceded by Girma Wolde-Giorgis	President of Ethiopia; 2013–2018	Succeeded by Sahle-Work Zewde
