= Amuru Jarte =

Woreda in Oromia Region of Ethiopia

Coordinates: 9°50′N 37°10′E

Amuru Jarte was one of the 180 woredas in the Oromia Region of Ethiopia. Part of the Misraq Welega Zone, Amuru Jarte was bordered on the south by Jimma Horo, on the southwest by Abe Dongoro, on the west by Gida Kiremu, on the north by the Abay River which separated it from the Amhara Region, and on the east by Abay Chomen. The administrative center of the woreda was Alibo; other towns in Amuru Jarte included Obora. Amuru Jarte was divided for Amuru and Jardega Jarte woredas.

== Overview ==
The altitude of this woreda ranges from 860 to 2657 meters above sea level; important peaks include Mount Koye, Mount Deben and Mount Dima. Rivers include the Angar, Chogo, Supe, Ejersa, Bereda, Kono, Aseeti and Jarmet. A survey of the land in this woreda shows that 49.1% is arable or cultivable, 16% pasture, 10.5% forest, and the remaining 24.4% is considered marshy, mountainous or otherwise unusable. Niger, rape and linseed are important cash crops.

Industry in the woreda includes 3 small grain mills; although a large amount of seeds yielding edible oil are grown here, there are no mills to process them. There are quarries to extract sandstone and gravel. There were 13 Farmers Associations with 9847 members and 10 Farmers Service Cooperatives with 7250 members. Amuru Jarte has 16 kilometers of dry weather road and all-weather road, for an average of road density of 7.39 kilometers per 1000 square kilometers. About 12.5% of the total population has access to drinking water.

This woreda was selected by the Ministry of Agriculture and Rural Development in 2004 as one of several areas for voluntary resettlement for farmers from overpopulated areas in the Misraq Welega Zone. Together with Bila Seyo, Gida Kiremu, Ibantu, Jimma Arjo, Limmu and Nunu Kumba, Amuru Jarte became the new home for a total of 22,462 heads of households and 112,310 total family members.

== Demographics ==
Based on figures published by the Central Statistical Agency in 2005, this woreda has an estimated total population of 102,721, of whom 52,398 were males and 50,323 were females; 10,420 or 10.14% of its population are urban dwellers, which is greater than the Zone average of 13.9%. With an estimated area of 2,165.01 square kilometers, Amuru Jarte has an estimated population density of 47.4 people per square kilometer, which is less than the Zone average of 81.4.

The 1994 national census reported a total population for this woreda of 73,008, of whom 35,908 were men and 37,100 women; 5,833 or 7.99% of its population were urban dwellers at the time. The two largest ethnic groups reported in Amuru Jarte were the Oromo (81.12%), and the Amhara (18.7%); all other ethnic groups made up 0.18% of the population. Oromiffa was spoken as a first language by 81.18%, and 18.7% spoke Amharic; the remaining 0.12% spoke all other primary languages reported. The majority of the inhabitants were Ethiopian Orthodox Christianity, with 70.32% of the population reporting they observed this faith, while 15.1% of the population said they were Moslem, 9.86% were Protestant, and 4.23% practiced traditional beliefs.
