= Sasiga =

District in Oromia Region, Ethiopia

Coordinates: 9°10′N 36°30′E

Sasiga is one of the woredas in the Oromia Region of Ethiopia and a part of the Misraq (East) Welega Zone. Sasiga is bordered on the south by Diga Leka, on the west by the Benishangul-Gumuz Region, on the northwest by Limmu, on the north by an exclave of the Benishangul-Gumuz Region and on the east by Guto Wayu. The administrative center of this woreda is Galo. Other towns in Sasiga include Handhura Balo, Bareda, Angar, Arb Gebeya, Ehud Gebeya, Gute and Tsige .

== Overview ==
Part of this woreda is characterized by its undulating hills. Rivers include the Karsa, Gumbi, Hare, Didiga, Kobo and the Bege Rivers. A survey of the land in this woreda shows that 11.9% is arable or cultivable, 2.8% is pasture, 1.6% is forest and the remainder (83.7)% is swampy, marshy or otherwise unusable. Forested land is organized into the Danbi, Laga Ayya, Baloo, Bareda and Gumbi natural forests and the Tsige State Forest. Local landmarks include the Kolobo Cave and the Bereda and Cumbi Falls. Coffee is an important crop in this woreda with over 5,000 hectares of plantation.

Industry in the woreda includes 3 grain mills. There are 7 Farmers Associations with 5,272 members and 5 Farmers Service Cooperatives with 4,727 members. Sasiga has 54 kilometers of dry weather roads and no all-weather road for an average road density of 57.6 kilometers per 1,000 square kilometers. About 11% of the total population has access to drinking water.

== History ==
Sasiga was one of six woredas in Misraq Welega selected for resettlement in 2003; the others being Guto Wayu, Diga Leka, Jimma Arjo, Sibu Sire and Gida Kiremu. Initially, 40,641 people were resettled in these districts from the Hararghe and Semien Shewa Zones, but due to crop failures, the number had fallen to 37,879 people.

Between 16 and 31 May 16, 2008, 400 Oromo men, women and children were reportedly slaughtered by Gumuz people from the Benishangul-Gumuz Region in the hills of the Angar and Didessa Rivers. Attempts by the Oromo Federalist Democratic Movement (OFDM) party to confirm these reports were frustrated by local officials, which led the OFDM to allege that there had been a government cover-up.

== Demographics ==
The 2007 national census published by the Central Statistical Agency reported the total population for this woreda to be 80,814, of whom 41,326 were men and 39,488 were women. 2,573 or 3.18% of its population are urban dwellers. The majority of the people (62.7%) were Protestants, while 21.55% are Muslim and 14.21% are Ethiopian Orthodox Christians.

The 1994 national census reported the total population for this woreda to be 44,892, of whom 22,246 were men and 22,646 women; 2,423 or 5.4% of its population were urban dwellers at the time. The two largest ethnic groups reported in Sasiga were the Oromo (96.15%), and the Amhara (3.34%) and all other ethnic groups made up 0.51% of the population. Oromiffa was spoken as a first language by 96.78% of the population and 2.94% spoke Amharic while the remaining 0.28% spoke all other primary languages reported. The majority of the inhabitants are Protestants, with 60.14% of the population reporting they observed this belief, while 36.15% of the population said they were Ethiopian Orthodox Christians, and 2.56% were Muslims.
