= Wayu Tuka =

Administrative division of Ethiopia

Wayo Tuka is one of the Aanaas in the Oromia of Ethiopia. It is part of the East Welega Zone. It was separated from Guto Wayu woreda. It is bounded by Sibu Sire in the north and east, Leka Dulecha in the south, and Guto Gida in west. Gute is the administrative center.

== Demographics ==
The 2007 national census reported a total population for this woreda of 63,180, of whom 30,879 were men and 32,301 were women; none of its population were urban dwellers. The majority of the inhabitants observed Protestantism, with 58.8% reporting that as their religion, while 28.71% observed Ethiopian Orthodox Christianity, and 9.15% were Catholics.
