= Jimma Arjo =

District in Oromia Region, Ethiopia

Coordinates: 8°40′N 36°40′E

Jimma Arjo is an woreda in the Oromia Region of Ethiopia. It shares the name of Oromo people clan, the Jimma Arjo. Part of the East Welega Zone, Jimma Arjo is bordered on the southwest by the Didessa River which separates it from the Illubabor Zone, on the northwest by Diga Leka, on the northeast by Guto Wayu, and on the southeast by Nunu Kumba. The administrative center of this woreda is Arjo.

== Overview ==
Except for the Didessa River valley, this woreda is considered highland. Other rivers includes the Chancho ,Kurruufaa,Laga Gurraachoo and Horo Rivers. Local landmarks include the Gambela Cave. A survey of the land in this woreda shows that 59.8% is arable or cultivable, 9.6% pasture, 8.4% forest, and the remaining 22.2% is considered swampy, mountainous or otherwise unusable. Coffee is an important cash crop of this woreda, and over 50 square kilometers are planted in this crop.

Industry in the woreda includes 27 grain mills. There were 13 Farmers Associations with 10,567 members and 9 Farmers Service Cooperatives with 7634 members. Jimma Arjo has 8 kilometers of dry weather road and 30 all-weather road, for an average of road density of 51.2 kilometers per 1000 square kilometers. About 17.5% of the total population has access to drinking water.

This woreda was selected by the Ministry of Agriculture and Rural Development in 2003 as an area for voluntary resettlement for farmers from overpopulated areas. While the majority were resettled in Jimma Arjo, including Gida Kiremu and Guto Wayu a total of 8435 heads of households and 31,781 total family members were resettled in Misraq Welega that year. Hawa Welele was selected again the next year and along with Amuru Jarte, Bila Seyo, Gida Kiremu, Ibantu, Limmu and Nunu Kumba, Gida Kiremu became the new home of another 22,462 heads of households and 112,310 total family members.

Currently, One big industry is under construction which is aimed to produce triple products viz: sugar, ethanol, and Chipwood. This may be a good opportunity for the area as it could create vast employment opportunity. Likewise, service sector is beneficiary from this industry after its accomplishment. Arjo, has served as a capital of the area for more than 130 years. Dano Bera, the local leader (Moti) of the area had been administering the Area (Leqa Dulacha in her earlier name) making Arjo as his center. Hence, she had been among few urban center's of West Oromia. Neftenya rulers like Ras Mekonnen Demissew had also occupied and ruled the area for longer times considering the town as a strategic for war.

== Demographics ==
The 2007 national census published by the Central Statistical Agency reported a total population for this woreda of 86,329, of whom 42,093 were men and 44,236 were women; 9,172 or 10.63% of its population are urban dwellers. The majority of the inhabitants observed Protestantism, with 48.85% reporting that as their religion, while 45% observed Ethiopian Orthodox Christianity, and 5.59% were Moslem.

The 1994 national census reported a total population for this woreda of 66,044, of whom 31,812 were men and 34,232 women; 6,539 or 9.9% of its population were urban dwellers at the time. The two largest ethnic groups reported in Jimma Arjo were the Oromo (97.24%), and the Amhara (2.48%); all other ethnic groups made up 0.28% of the population. Oromiffa was spoken as a first language by 99.48%. The majority of the inhabitants were Ethiopian Orthodox Christianity, with 81.57% of the population reporting they observed this belief, while 7.64% of the population said they were Protestant, 5.37% practiced traditional beliefs, and 5.23% were Moslem.
