= Seru (disambiguation) =

Seru is a town in southeastern Ethiopia.

Seru may also refer to:

- Seru (name)
- Seru (Dragon Ball) or Cell, a character in Dragon Ball media
- Seru (Legend of Legaia), a race of creatures in the Legend of Legaia universe
- Seru (woreda), in Ethiopia
- Seru language, an Austronesian language of Borneo

== See also ==
- Serú Girán, an Argentine rock band
- Cero (disambiguation)
