= Amuru =

Amuru may refer to:

== People ==
- Amuru Mitsuhiro, a Russian sumo wrestler

== Places ==
- Amuru, Ethiopia, a town in Horo Gudru Welega Zone, Ethiopia
- Amuru (woreda), a woreda in the Oromia Region of Ethiopia
- Amuru District, a district in Northern Uganda
- Amuru, Uganda, a town in Amuru District, Uganda
