= Gatama =

- Location within Ethiopia
- Coordinates: 8°54′N 36°29′E
- Country: Ethiopia
- Region: Oromia
- Zone: Misraq Welega
- Elevation: 2,142 m (7,028 ft)

Population (2005)
  - Total: 4,082
- Time zone: UTC+3 (EAT)

Gatama (also transliterated Getema, Catama Argio) is a town in western Ethiopia. Located in the Misraq Welega Zone of the Oromia Region, it has a latitude and longitude of 08°54′N 36°29′E with an elevation of 2,142 meters above sea level. It is the administrative center of Diga Leka woreda.

== Overview ==
This town was reported in 1997 to have telephone and postal service. Electricity is provided to Gatama from a diesel generator, which was reported as undependable.

Records at the Nordic Africa Institute website provide details of a primary school at Gatama in 1968.

Based on figures from the Central Statistical Agency in 2005, Gatama has an estimated total population of 4,082 of whom 1,969 were males and 2,113 were females. The 1994 census reported this town had a total population of 2,285 of whom 1,068 were males and 1,217 were females.Gatama
