= Nunu Kumba =

District in Oromia Region, Ethiopia

Coordinates: 8°40′N 36°45′E

Nunu Kumba is one of 180 woredas in the Oromia Region of Ethiopia. Part of the East Welega Zone, Nunu Kumba is bordered on the southwest by the Didessa River which separates it from the Illubabor Zone, on the northwest by Jimma Arjo, on the north by Guto Wayu, on the northeast by Wama Bonaya, and on the southeast by the Wama which separates it from the Jimma Zone. The administrative center of this woreda is Nunu.

== Overview ==
The altitude of this woreda ranges from 1500 to 2664 meters above sea level; Mount Kaba, Mount Modo and Mount Imatu are some of the highest peaks. Rivers include the Negesso, Jawero, Sifa, Gindo and Jejeba. A survey of the land in this woreda shows that 75.9% is arable or cultivable (32.4% under annual crops), 10.9% pasture, 4.9% forest, and the remaining 8.3% is considered swampy, mountainous or otherwise unusable. Tobacco, niger seed and sesame are important cash crops.

There were 11 Farmers Associations with 8336 members and 8 Farmers Service Cooperatives with 3558 members in this woreda. Nunu Kumba has 14.3 kilometers of dry weather road and no all-weather road, for an average of road density of 23.55 kilometers per 1000 square kilometers. About 6% of the total population has access to drinking water.

This woreda was selected by the Ministry of Agriculture and Rural Development in 2004 as one of several areas for voluntary resettlement for farmers from overpopulated areas in the Misraq Welega Zone. Together with Amuru Jarte, Bila Seyo, Gida Kiremu, Ibantu, Jimma Arjo and Limmu, Nunu Kumba became the new home for a total of 22,462 heads of households and 112,310 total family members.

== Demographics ==
The 2007 national census published by the Central Statistical Agency reported a total population for this woreda of 64,775, of whom 31,817 were men and 32,958 were women; 4,842 or 7.48% of its population are urban dwellers. The majority of the inhabitants observed Protestantism, with 55.29% reporting that as their religion, while 25.2% observed Ethiopian Orthodox Christianity, and 19.29% were Moslem.

The 1994 national census reported a total population for this woreda of 45,421, of whom 22,091 were men and 23,330 women; 1,830 or 4.03% of its population were urban dwellers at the time. The two largest ethnic groups reported in Nunu Kumba were the Oromo (98.88%), and the Amhara (1.06%); all other ethnic groups made up 0.06% of the population. Afan Oromo was spoken as a first language by 99.89% of the population. The majority of the inhabitants were Ethiopian Orthodox Christianity, with 55.76% of the population reporting they observed this belief, while 25.4% of the population said they were Protestant, and 17.71% were Muslim.
