= Ibantu =

District in Oromia Region, Ethiopia

Coordinates: 10°00′N 36°35′E

Ibantu is one of woredas in the Oromia Region of Ethiopia. Part of the East Welega Zone, Ibantu is bordered on the south by Limmu, on the west and north by the Benishangul-Gumuz Region, and on the east by Gida Kiremu. The administrative center of this woreda is Hinde.

== Overview ==
Important peaks in this district include Mount Charem and Mount Atebala. Rivers include the Moger, Welmel and Boye. Notable attractions include the Tarbi Cave and mount and Shara Falls. A survey of the land in this woreda shows that 64.4% is arable or cultivable, 10.7% pasture, 16.6% forest, and the remaining 8.3% are grouped under other uses. Coffee is an important cash crop of this woreda. Over 50 square kilometers are planted with this crop.

Industry in the district includes one grain mill. Extracted minerals include gold, granite and clay. There were 11 Farmers Associations. Ibantu has 30 kilometers of dry weather road and no all-weather road, for an average of road density of 32.3 kilometers per 1000 square kilometers. Since the completion of Hinde's water supply project in 1998, 6.2% of the total population has access to drinking water.

This district was selected by the Ministry of Agriculture and Rural Development in 2004 as one of several areas for voluntary resettlement for farmers from overpopulated areas in the East Welega Zone. Together with Amuru Jarte, Bila Seyo, Gida Kiremu, Jimma Arjo, Limmu and Nunu Kumba, Ibantu became the new home for a total of 22,462 heads of households and 112,310 total family members.

== Demographics ==
The 2007 national census reported a total population for this district of 36,280, of whom 18,154 were men and 18,126 were women; 2,789 or 7.69% of its population were urban dwellers. The majority of the inhabitants observed Protestantism, with 79.95% reporting that as their religion, while 17.26% observed Ethiopian Orthodox Christianity.

Based on figures published by the Central Statistical Agency in 2005, this district has an estimated total population of 35,302, of whom 17,969 are men and 17,333 are women; 2,619 or 7.42% of its population are urban dwellers, which is greater than the Zone average of 13.9%. With an estimated area of 928.91 square kilometers, Ibantu has an estimated population density of 38 people per square kilometer, which is less than the Zone average of 81.4.

The 1994 national census reported a total population for this district of 25,252, of whom 12,454 were men and 12,798 women; 1,466 or 5.81% of its population were urban dwellers at the time. The two largest ethnic groups reported in Ibantu were the Oromo (98.52%), and the Amhara (1.12%); all other ethnic groups made up 1.17% of the population. Oromiffa was spoken as a first language by 99.34%. The majority of the inhabitants were Ethiopian Orthodox Christianity, with 79.07% of the population reporting they observed this belief, while 20.76% of the population said they were Protestant.
