= Gelila, Ethiopia =

Gelila (Amharic: ገሊላ) is a town in western Ethiopia. Located in the East Welega Zone of the Oromia Region, it has a latitude and longitude of 09°51′N 36°29′E with an elevation of 2140 meters above sea level. It is the administrative center of Limmu woreda.

== Overview ==
Records at the Nordic Africa Institute website provide details of a primary school in Gelila during the year 1968. Landmarks in the town include the church of St. Giyorgis.

Based on figures from the Central Statistical Agency in 2014, Gelila has an estimated total population of 8,890 of whom 4,248 are men and 4,642 are women. The 2012 census reported this town had a total population of 8,741 of whom 4,219 were men and 4,522 women.
