= Limmu (woreda) =

District in Oromia Region, Ethiopia

Coordinates: 9°10′N 36°20′E

Limmu is a woreda in Oromia Region, Ethiopia. Part of the East Welega Zone, Limmu is bordered on the south by an exclave of the Benishangul-Gumuz Region, on the southwest by Sasiga, on the west by the Benishangul-Gumuz Region, on the north by Ibantu, and on the east by Gida Kiremu. The administrative center of the woreda is Gelila. Haro Limmu woreda was part of Limmu woreda.

== Overview ==
The altitude of this district ranges from 650 to 2320 meters above sea level; Tullu Sire and Salen are the two most prominent peaks. Rivers within the woreda include the Wajja, Keraru, Kuni, Abeyi, Lugo and Weddessa. A survey of the land in this woreda shows that 36% is arable or cultivable (15.2% was under annual crops), 27.4% pasture, 16.4% forest, and the remaining 20.2% is considered swampy, marshy or otherwise unusable. Annual crops are grown on 23,664 hectares of land (mostly teff and corn), yielding a harvest of about 188,953 quintals.

Industry in the district includes 10 grain mills; although no detailed survey of the mineral resources of this district has been conducted, gold, granite and clay are some of the resources known to be exploited by the local community. There were 25 Farmers Associations with 21,045 members and 13 Farmers Service Cooperatives with 8,642 members. Limmu has 48 kilometers of dry weather road and no all-weather road, for an average of road density of 20.2 kilometers per 1000 square kilometers. About 7.6% of the total population has access to drinking water.

This district was selected by the Ministry of Agriculture and Rural Development in 2004 as one of several areas for voluntary resettlement for farmers from overpopulated areas in the East Welega Zone. Together with Amuru Jarte, Bila Seyo, Gida Kiremu, Ibantu, Jimma Arjo and Nunu Kumba, Limmu became the new home for a total of 22,462 heads of households and 112,310 total family members.

== Demographics ==
The 2007 national census published by the Central Statistical Agency reported a total population for this woreda of 72,483, of whom 36,181 were men and 36,302 were women; 4,170 or 5.75% of its population were urban dwellers. The majority of the inhabitants were Ethiopian Orthodox Christianity, with 49.50% of the population reporting they observed this belief, while 41.21% of the population said they were Protestant, and 7.68% were Moslem.

The 1994 national census reported a total population for this woreda of 90,544, of whom 45,067 were men and 45,477 women; 2,741 or 3.03% of its population were urban dwellers at the time. The two largest ethnic groups reported in Limmu were the Oromo (85.84%), and the Amhara (13.39%); all other ethnic groups made up 0.71% of the population. Oromiffa was spoken as a first language by 85.81%, and 13.55% spoke Amharic; the remaining 0.64% spoke all other primary languages reported. The majority of the inhabitants were Ethiopian Orthodox Christians, with 76.05% of the population reporting they observed this belief, while 13.92% of the population said they were Protestant, and 7.92% were Moslem.
