= Wama Bonaya =

Coordinates: 8°00′N 37°00′E

Wama Bonaya was one of the 180 woredas in the Oromia of Ethiopia. It was divided for Bonaya Boshe and Wama Hagalo woredas. Part of the East Welega Zone, Wama Bonaya was bordered on the southwest by Nunu Kumba, on the west by Guto Wayu, on the northwest by Sibu Sire, on the north by Bila Seyo, on the northeast by the Mirab Shewa Zone, and on the southeast by the Jimma Zone. The administrative center of this woreda was Bilo; other towns in Wama Bonaya included Mote.

== Overview ==
This woreda is characterized by rugged terrain; peaks include Mount Konchi, Mount Sodu, Mount Sokso, and Mount Berema. Rivers include the Urgessa, Jarti, Timbako, Wedesa, Wama and Birbirsa Rivers. A survey of the land in this woreda shows that 49.7% is arable or cultivable (23.9% was under annual crops), 23.2% pasture, 8.5% forest, and the remaining 18.5% is considered swampy, mountainous or otherwise unusable. Local landmarks include the Konchi State Forest. Cash crops include peppers.

Industry in the woreda includes 3 grain mills. There were 16 Farmers Associations with 8501 members and 9 Farmers Service Cooperatives with 6253 members. Wama Bonaya has 9.4 kilometers of dry weather and no all-weather road, for an average of road density of 2.35 kilometers per 1000 square kilometers. About 3.5% of the total population has access to drinking water.

== Demographics ==
Based on figures published by the Central Statistical Agency in 2005, this woreda has an estimated total population of 98,168, of whom 50,564 are men and 47,604 are women; 3,275 or 3.34% of its population are urban dwellers, which is less than the Zone average of 13.9%. With an estimated area of 1,103.75 square kilometers, Wama Bonaya has an estimated population density of 88.9 people per square kilometer, which is more than the Zone average of 81.4.

The 1994 national census reported a total population for this woreda of 70,890, of whom 34,572 were men and 36,318 women; 1,834 or 2.59% of its population were urban dwellers at the time. The two largest ethnic groups reported in Wama Bonaya were the Oromo (97.19%), and the Amhara (2.7%); all other ethnic groups made up 0.11% of the population. Oromiffa was spoken as a first language by 98.24%, and 1.73% spoke Amharic; the remaining 0.03% spoke all other primary languages reported. The majority of the inhabitants were Ethiopian Orthodox Christianity, with 56.76% of the population reporting they observed this belief, while 23.02% of the population said they were Protestant, 16.92% were Moslem, 1.96% were Roman Catholic, and 0.9% observed traditional beliefs.
