= Diga =

Diga may refer to:

- Diga (woreda)
- Diga (album)
- Diga (footballer)
- DiGA (DIgital Health Applications in Germany)
