= Arjo =

Town in Oromia Region, Ethiopia

Arjo አርጆ (in Amharic) Arjoo (in Oromo)
- Village
- Location in Ethiopia
- Coordinates: 8°49′N 36°28′E
- Country: Ethiopia
- Region: Oromia
- Zone: East Welega
- Elevation: 2,566 m (8,419 ft)

Population (2006)
  - Total: under 1,000
- Time zone: UTC+3 (EAT)
- Climate: Aw

Arjo (Amharic: አርጆ, Oromo: Arjoo, also spelled Argio) is a town in Ethiopia, located in Jimma Arjo woreda, in the Misraq Welega Zone of the Oromo Region.

== Overview ==
Serving in the town from 1997 to 1997, Kate Collins Faber, a Peace Corps volunteer, described it as appearing to be "a fairly large village with clusters of tin-roofed houses lining the gravel road," but that in actuality the town was very small.

In 2001 a pesticide dumpsite was said to exist in the town, containing DDT, Malathion, pirimiphos-methyl, and fenitrothion. It was established in the early 1850s by a group of Macaa Oromo. Arjo was named by the name of its founder and the first Abba Gadaa governor. Odaa Arjo and Caffee Arjo are located at the south outskirt of the town.

The Comboni Missionary Sisters operate a kindergarten in the town.

== Notable people ==
President Mulatu Teshome was born in Arjo. Dr. Haile Fida, one of the pioneers in developing modern Afaan Oromo writing system (Qubee Afaan Oromo), was born in Arjo and attended his early education here. Captain Gashahun Tariku Kalbessa, a former Ethiopian Air Force pilot and one of the top pilots in the history of the Ethiopian Air Force was born in Arjo and completed his early education here.
