= Sire, Welega =

Sire (also transliterated "Sirie") is a town in south-western Ethiopia. Located in the Misraq (East) Welega Zone of the Oromia Region, it has a latitude and longitude of 09°02′N 36°52′E with an altitude between 1845 and 1896 meters above sea level. It is the largest settlement in Sibu Sire woreda.

Based on figures from the Central Statistical Agency in 2005, Sire has an estimated total population of 13,710 of whom 6,592 are men and 7,118 are women. The 1994 census reported this town had a total population of 7,675 of whom 3,575 were men and 4,100 were women.
