= Bako Tibe =

Aanaa in the Oromia region of Ethiopia

Coordinates: 9°00′N 37°10′E

Bako Tibe is one of the Aanaas, or districts, in the Oromia region of Ethiopia. Part of the West Shewa Zone, Bako Tibe is bordered on the south and west by the East Welega Zone, on the north by Horo Gudru Welega Zone, and on the east by Cheliya. The administrative center of this woreda is Bako; other towns in Bako Tibe include Tibe and Shoboka.

== Overview ==
Rivers in this woreda include the Abuko, Mara, Robi and Gibe. The all-weather highway which links Nekemte to the capital city Addis Ababa runs through all three towns in this woreda. A survey of the land in Bako Tibe shows that 54.25% is arable or cultivable, 23.98% pasture, 5.12% forest, and 16.65% infrastructure or other uses. Although coffee is an important cash crop of this woreda, less than 20 square kilometers are planted with this crop.

There are 38 primary schools in this woreda, 20 providing education for grades 1-4 and 18 providing education for grades 1–8, and two secondary education schools, one providing education for grades 9-10 and the other for grades 11–12. Health services are provided by one health center, 10 clinics, and 6 health posts; these facilities are ill-equipped and under-staffed, making them insufficient to reach the entire population.

== Demographics ==
The 2007 national census reported a total population for this woreda of 123,031, of whom 61,018 were men and 62,013 were women; 22,851 or 18.57% of its population were urban dwellers. The majority of the inhabitants said they were Protestant, with 60.87% of the population reporting they observed this belief, while 28.58% of the population practised Ethiopian Orthodox Christianity, and 8.21% were Muslim.

Based on figures published by the Central Statistical Agency in 2005, this woreda has an estimated total population of 133,799, of whom 68,401 are men and 65,398 are women; 28,294 or 21.15% of its population are urban dwellers, which is greater than the Zone average of 12.3%. With an estimated area of 637.19 square kilometers, Bako Tibe has an estimated population density of 210 people per square kilometer, which is greater than the Zone average of 152.8.

The 1994 national census reported a total population for this woreda of 92,608, of whom 45,245 were men and 47,363 women; 15,827 or 17.09% of its population were urban dwellers at the time. The three largest ethnic groups reported in Bako Tibe were the Oromo (68.34%), the Amhara (34.63%), and the Sebat Bet Gurage (2.02%); all other ethnic groups made up 1.01% of the population. The amharic language was spoken as a first language by 65.82%, and 48.4% spoke oromo language; the remaining 0.78% spoke all other primary languages reported. A plurality of the inhabitants professed Ethiopian Orthodox Christianity, with 44.79% of the population reporting they practiced that belief, while 22.37% of the population said they were Protestant, 19.31% practiced traditional beliefs, 9.23% were Muslim, and 0.98% were Catholic.
