= Gutin =

Town in Oromia, Ethiopia

Anger Gute Town Administration (Gutin)
- Town
- Location within Ethiopia
- Coordinates: 09°33′55″N 36°37′59″E
- Country: Ethiopia
- Region: Oromia
- Zone: East Welega
- Woreda: Anger Gute Town Administration
- Elevation: 1,358 m (4,455 ft)

Population (2024)
  - Total: 65,350
- Time zone: UTC+3 (EAT)

Anger Gute Town Administration is a town in Anger Gute Town Administration, East Welega Zone, Oromia Region, Ethiopia. The town is located to the north of Didesa River and west of Anger Wenz River, with an elevation of 1,358 meters above the sea level. As of 2024, it had a total population of 65350.

== Climate ==
Anger Gute Town (Gutin) has a Tropical Savanna Climate (Aw). It receives the most precipitation in July, with an average rainfall of 366 mm; and the least precipitation in January, with an average rainfall of 1 mm.

Climate data for Gutin
Month	Jan	Feb	Mar	Apr	May	Jun	Jul	Aug	Sep	Oct	Nov	Dec	Year
Mean daily maximum °C (°F)	29.6 (85.3)	31.3 (88.3)	31.6 (88.9)	30.7 (87.3)	27.7 (81.9)	24.8 (76.6)	22.8 (73.0)	22.7 (72.9)	23.8 (74.8)	25.2 (77.4)	26.7 (80.1)	28.1 (82.6)	27.1 (80.8)
Daily mean °C (°F)	23.1 (73.6)	24.8 (76.6)	25.2 (77.4)	24.7 (76.5)	22.3 (72.1)	19.9 (67.8)	18.7 (65.7)	18.6 (65.5)	19.1 (66.4)	20.0 (68.0)	20.9 (69.6)	21.9 (71.4)	21.6 (70.9)
Mean daily minimum °C (°F)	17.0 (62.6)	18.6 (65.5)	19.4 (66.9)	19.5 (67.1)	17.9 (64.2)	16.0 (60.8)	15.5 (59.9)	15.4 (59.7)	15.3 (59.5)	15.5 (59.9)	15.6 (60.1)	16.2 (61.2)	16.8 (62.3)
Average rainfall mm (inches)	1 (0.0)	3 (0.1)	15 (0.6)	51 (2.0)	166 (6.5)	327 (12.9)	366 (14.4)	350 (13.8)	285 (11.2)	108 (4.3)	25 (1.0)	5 (0.2)	1,702 (67)
Source: Climate-Data.org
