= Haro Limmu =

District in Oromia, Ethiopia

Haro Limmu is one of the woreda/ Districts in the East Wollegga zone Oromia Region of Ethiopia. It is part of the East Welega Zone. It was separated from Limmu woreda. It is bounded by Limmu in the east, Benishangul-Gumuz Region in the west and Anger River in the south and Ibantu in the north. Haro is the administrative center.

== Demographics ==
The 2007 national census reported a total population for this woreda of 52,163, of whom 26,052 were men and 26,111 were women; none of its population were urban dwellers. The majority of the inhabitants observed Protestantism, with 54.07% reporting that as their religion, while 28.79% observed Ethiopian Orthodox Christianity, and 9.21% practiced traditional religions.
