= Bilo, Ethiopia =

One of the town in the Oromia Regional state of Ethiopia

Coordinates: 8°40′N 37°35′E

Bilo, formerly spelled Billo and Billò, is a town in central Ethiopia. It is located in the East Welega Zone of the Oromia at an elevation of 2,505 meters (8,219 ft) above sea level. Bilo is the administrative center of Wama Bonaya woreda and was sometimes also known as Bila and Falle.

== Overview ==
Local landmarks in Bilo include the Medhane Alem church.

The Russian explorer Alexander Bulatovich visited Bilo 8 November 1896. At the time, it was a crossroads for caravans travelling between south-western Ethiopia and Gojjam on their way to the traditional Ethiopian port of Massawa. Although it was in the territory of Dejazmach Demissew Nassibu, it was not part of it; instead it was under the rule of a nagadras or governor of its marketplace. Bulatovich noted that the settlement had fewer than 300 permanent residents and, in light of the colonial developments along the Red Sea coast, most of south Ethiopia's trade had shifted to the routes through Harar to the French port at Djibouti and the British-held port at Zayla. The opening of the Franco-Ethiopian Railway at Dire Dawa in 1901 drove still more of the trade along these routes at the expense of Bilo and nearby Leika.

Dunlop mentions Bilo in his memoirs of travelling through western Ethiopia with Captain R.H.R. Taylor in 1935, as where they watched women spin thread and a man weave cloth to be sold at Addis Ababa. Dunlop describes Bilo as a "village of some size" east of the Dodu pass between Mount Konchi and Mount Sodu

== Demographics ==
Based on figures from the Central Statistical Agency in 2005, Bilo has an estimated total population of 2,401 of whom 1,108 are men and 1,293 are women. The 1994 census reported this town had a total population of 1,346 of whom 601 were men and 745 women.
