= Wama Hagalo =

Woreda in Oromia Region, Ethiopia

Wama Hagalo is one of the woredas in the Oromia Region of Ethiopia. It is part of the Misraq Welega Zone and it was part of former Wama Bonaya woreda. It is bounded by Bonaya Boshe in the east, Wayu Tuka in the west, Sibu Sire in the north and Jimma Zone to the south. The administrative center of the woreda is Mote.

== Demographics ==
The 2007 national census reported a total population for this woreda of 49,103, of whom 24,820 were men and 24,283 were women; none of its population are urban dwellers. The majority of the inhabitants observed Protestantism, with 61.19% reporting that as their religion, while 23.27% were Muslim and 15.42% observed Ethiopian Orthodox Christianity.
