= Abul Kasim (mountain) =

Mountain in Ethiopia

- Location within Ethiopia

Highest point
- Elevation: 2,573 m (8,442 ft)
- Listing: List of mountains in Ethiopia
- Coordinates: 7°42.6′N 40°30.6′E

Geography
- Location: Arsi Zone, Oromia Region, Ethiopia

Abul Kasim is a mountain in southeastern Ethiopia. Located in the Arsi Zone of the Oromia Region, this mountain has an elevation of 2,573 metres (8,442 ft) above sea level. It is the highest point in Seru woreda.

Although this mountain has great importance to Oromo cultural and religious tradition as the home of the Abba Muda, it is also important as the location of the tomb of a descendant of the Muslim saint Sheikh Hussein, and is the object of an annual pilgrimage. Trimingham describes the tomb as "covered with glass beads and ornaments of copper and brass. Similar ornament are to be seen on some trees in the forest, and no visitors would dare touch these holy objects."
