= Bonaya Boshe =

Administrative division of Ethiopia

Bonaya Boshe is one of the woredas in the Oromia Region of Ethiopia. It is part of the Misraq Welega Zone and it was part of former Wama Bonaya woreda.

== Demographics ==
The 2007 national census reported a total population for this woreda of 47,886, of whom 23,514 were men and 24,372 were women; 2,716 or 5,67% of its population are urban dwellers. The majority of the inhabitants observed Protestantism, with 61.59% reporting that as their religion, while 27.38% observed Ethiopian Orthodox Christianity and 10.73% were Muslim
