= Gida Kiremu =

District in Oromia Region, Ethiopia

Coordinates: 9°45′N 35°50′E

Gida Ayana and Kiremu is a woreda in the Oromia Region of Ethiopia. Part of the East Welega Zone, Gida Ayana and Kiremu is bordered on the south by Guto Gida, on the west by Limmu, on the northwest by Ibantu, on the east by Horo Gudru Welega Zone, and on the north by the Blue Nile river. The administrative center of the woreda is Gida Ayana; other towns include Gutin and Kiremu.

This district is characterized by undulating hills north of Dicho Ridge and by plains south of it; it was once covered by extensive forests, but as of 2005 only a few fragments remain. Rivers within the woreda include the Werabessa, Wajja, Chinia and Werabu. A survey of the land in this woreda shows that 65.7% is arable or cultivable (61% was under annual crops), 22.8% pasture, 8.7% forest, and the remaining 2.8% is considered unusable. Sesame and khat are two important cash crops. A third is Coffee, but less than 20 km^{2} is planted with this crop.

Industry in the district includes 13 grain mills; granite has been identified as a potential commercial resource. There were 22 Farmers Associations with 19,168 members and 14 Farmers Service Cooperatives with 9,982 members. Gida Kiremu has 143 kilometers of all-weather road, for an average of road density of 60.3 kilometers per 1000 square kilometers. About 27% of the total population has access to drinking water.

== History ==
It is said to have been found in 1807 by a man named Ayane Goro. In February 2001, fighting between former drought victims from the Amhara region, who had been resettled in the East Wellega zone of the Oromia region, and Oromos in the Gida district resulted in the death of one Oromo policeman and several Amharas. Press reports indicated that there were hundreds of deaths throughout the year; however, the total number remained unknown at year's end. Other reports stated that 12,000 Amhara settlers had been forced to flee due to the violence and that 500 houses were burned and 3,000 head of cattle stolen.

Despite these reports, Gida was selected two years later by the Ministry of Agriculture and Rural Development as an area for voluntary resettlement for farmers from overpopulated areas. Along with Guto Wayu and Jimma Arjo, Gida became the home for a total of 8435 heads of households and 31,781 total family members in that year. Gida was selected again in 2004 and along with Amuru Jarte, Bila Seyo, Ibantu, Jimma Arjo, Limmu and Nunu Kumba became the new home of another 22,462 heads of households and 112,310 total family members.

== Demographics ==
The 2007 national census reported a total population for this district of 158,635, of whom 79,878 were men and 78,757 were women; 27,115 or 17.09% of its population were urban dwellers. The majority of the inhabitants were Ethiopian Orthodox Christianity, with 59.33% of the population reporting they observed this belief, while 23.4% of the population said they were Protestant, and 16.17% were Moslem.

Based on figures published by the Central Statistical Agency in 2005, this district has an estimated total population of 144,866, of whom 72,673 are men and 72,193 are women; 21,777 or 15.03% of its population are urban dwellers, which is greater than the Zone average of 13.9%. With an estimated area of 2,370.94 square kilometers, Gida has an estimated population density of 61.1 people per square kilometer, which is less than the Zone average of 81.4. By area, it is the largest woreda in Misraq Welega Zone.

The 1994 national census reported a total population for this district of 101,766, of whom 50,805 were men and 50,961 women; 12,176 or 11.96% of its population were urban dwellers at the time. The three largest ethnic groups reported in Gida Ayana were the Oromo (67.65%), the Amhara (29.01%), and the Tigray (3.25%); all other ethnic groups made up 0.09% of the population. Oromo was spoken as a first language by 67.43%, 29.31% spoke Amharic, and 3.19% spoke Tigrinya; the remaining 0.07% spoke all other primary languages reported. The majority of the inhabitants were Ethiopian Orthodox Christianity, with 77.59% of the population reporting they observed this faith, while 15.45% of the population said they were Moslem, and 6.53% were Protestant.
