= Seru (name) =

Seru is both a surname and a given name. Notable people with the name include:

== People with the surname Seru ==
- Apaitia Seru, successor of Sailosi Kepa
- Inoke Seru, leader of a rump of the Fijian Association Party
- John Seru (born 1964), Australian entertainer

== People with the given name Seru ==
- Abba Seru Gwangul (died 1778), chieftain of an Ethiopian ethnic group
- Seru Epenisa Cakobau (1815–1883), Fijian chief and warlord
- Various rulers of the Bariba state of Nikki
- Seru Rabeni (born 1978), Fijian rugby union footballer

== See also ==
- Seru (disambiguation)
