= Seru (Aanaa) =

District of Ethiopia

Coordinates: 7°40′N 40°15′E

Seru is one of the Aanaas in the Oromia of Ethiopia. It is named after the Aanaa capital, Seru. Part of the Arsi Zone, Seru is bordered on the south and east by the Shebelle River which separates it from the Bale Zone, on the west by the Wabe River which separates it from Robe, on the north by Aminya, and on the northeast by the West Hararghe Zone. Woreda of Bale Gasegar was separated form Seru.

== Overview ==
The altitude of this woreda ranges from 950 to 2500 meters above sea level; Abul Kasim is the highest point. Rivers include the 70 kilometers of the Darro and 25 kilometers of the Waji. A survey of the land in this woreda shows that 19.8% is arable or cultivable (13.1% was under annual crops), 21.8% pasture, 32.9% forest, and the remaining 25.5% is considered swampy, mountainous or otherwise unusable. The Arba Liji cave and mosque are local landmarks. Khat and coffee are important cash crops.

Industry in the woreda includes 16 grain mills employing 45 people, as well as 269 registered businessmen of whom 26% were wholesalers, 57.6% retailers and 16.4% were service providers. There were 27 Farmers Associations with 13,573 members and 5 Farmers Service Cooperatives with 10,496 members. Seru has 31 kilometers of dry-weather road and 34 of all-weather road, for an average of road density of 27.5 kilometers per 1000 square kilometers. About 14.1% of the total population has access to drinking water.

== Demographics ==
The 2007 national census reported a total population for this woreda of 47,929, of whom 24,125 were men and 23,804 were women; 3,174 or 6.62% of its population were urban dwellers. The majority of the inhabitants said they were Muslim, with 83.72% of the population reporting they observed this belief, while 16.08% of the population practised Ethiopian Orthodox Christianity.

Based on figures published by the Central Statistical Agency in 2005, this woreda has an estimated total population of 112,183, of whom 56,642 are men and 55,541 are women; 7,733 or 6.89% of its population are urban dwellers, which is less than the Zone average of 12.3%. With an estimated area of 2,361.57 square kilometers, Seru has an estimated population density of 47.5 people per square kilometer, which is less than the Zone average of 132.2.

The 1994 national census reported a total population for this woreda of 80,358, of whom 40,007 were men and 40,351 women; 4,334 or 5.39% of its population were urban dwellers at the time. The two largest ethnic groups reported in Seru were Oromo (93.64%), and Amhara (6.08%); all other ethnic groups made up 0.28% of the population. Oromiffa was spoken as a first language by 90.62%, and 5.86% spoke Amharic; the remaining 3.52% spoke all other primary languages reported. The majority of the inhabitants were Muslim, with 63% of the population having reported they practiced that belief, while 36.8% of the population said they professed Ethiopian Orthodox Christianity.
