= Amuru, Ethiopia =

Amuru
- Location in Ethiopia
- Coordinates: 09°59′23″N 37°01′44″E
- Country: Ethiopia
- Region: Oromia Region
- Zone: Horo Guduru Welega Zone
- District: Amuru (woreda)
- Elevation: 7,900 ft (2,400 m)

Amuru is a town in the Amuru woreda of the Horo Guduru Welega Zone, in the Oromia Region of Ethiopia.

The Amuru woreda is a district that is known for its production of teff, barley, maize and other cereal crops.

== Location ==
Amuru is approximately 392 km northwest of Addis Ababa, Ethiopia. It is a district located in Horro Guduruu, Wallaggaa zone, Oromiya Region. Oborra is the town of the government seat. Agamsa is the other town in the district, located west of Oborra.

Amuru is where the Pentecostal Christian movement flourished through the proselytizing of Mekuria Mulugeta, who was a school teacher at Amuru Elementary School in the early 1960s. His converts, like Rorro Waxa, Rorro Qare, and many other gospel preachers, spread Pentecostal Christianity. Amuru also has communities of different religions, including followers of Orthodox Christianity and Muslims.
