= Boji Chokorsa =

Aanaas in Ethiopia

Boji Chokorsa is one of the Aanaas in the Oromia of Ethiopia. It is part of the West Welega Zone and part of former Boji woreda. It is bounded by Nejo in the north, Boji Dirmaji in the northeast, Lalo Asabi in the southeast and Guliso in the south. Muklemi is the administrative center.

== Demographics ==
The 2007 national census reported the population for this woreda at 48,871 in 9,452 households, of whom 24,120 were men and 24,751 were women; 1,479 or 3.03% of its population were urban dwellers. The majority of the inhabitants (92.44%) observed Protestantism, while 7.17% observed Ethiopian Orthodox Christianity.
