= Gomole (woreda) =

- District
- Country: Ethiopia
- Region: Oromia
- Zone: Borena Zone

Gomole is a district of Borena Zone in Oromia Region of Ethiopia.
