= Diga Leka =

Former district in Oromia Region, Ethiopia

Coordinates: 8°50′N 36°30′E

Diga was one of the 180 woredas in the Oromia Region of Ethiopia. It was separated from Leka Dulecha woredas. Part of the Misraq Welega Zone, Diga Leka was bordered on the south by an exclave of the Benishangul-Gumuz Region, on the west by the Didessa River which separates it from the Illubabor Zone on the southwest and the Mirab Welega Zone on the west, on the north by Sasiga, on the northeast by Guto Wayu and on the southeast by Leka Dulacha. The administrative center of the woreda was Diga; towns in Diga Woreda are Arjo Gudetu and Diga. Diga woreda is 12 km away from capital city of East Wollega, Nekemt town.

== Overview ==
The landscape of this woreda is rugged, dominated by Mount Botoro Kofo and Mount Boti Duguma. Rivers within the woreda include the Negesso, Jato, Beseka, Abono, Gebo, Medale, Dimtu and Jima. A survey of the land in this woreda shows that 59.7% is arable or cultivable (68% was under annual crops), 23% pasture, 6.1% forest, and the remainder is 11.2%. Khat is one important cash crop. Although coffee is another important cash crop, less than 20 square kilometers are planted in this woreda with this crop.

Industry in the woreda includes 16 grain mills; coal and clay are also present. There were 21 Farmers Associations with 18,590 members and 10 Farmers Service Cooperatives with 89,590 members. Limmu has 89 kilometers of all-weather road, for an average of road density of 70.47 kilometers per 1000 square kilometers. About 15% of the total population has access to drinking water.

== Demographics ==
Based on figures published by the Central Statistical Agency in 2005, this woreda has an estimated total population of 140,282, of whom 72,392 are men and 67,890 are women; 10,652 or 7.59% of its population are urban dwellers, which is greater than the Zone average of 13.9%. With an estimated area of 1,263.28 square kilometers, Diga Leka has an estimated population density of 111 people per square kilometer, which is greater than the Zone average of 81.4.

The 1994 national census reported a total population for this woreda of 100,287, of whom 48,713 were men and 51,574 women; 5,956 or 5.94% of its population were urban dwellers at the time. The two largest ethnic groups reported in Diga Leka were the Oromo (95.64%), and the Amhara (3.28%); all other ethnic groups made up 1.18% of the population. Oromiffa was spoken as a first language by 96.75%, and 2.54% spoke Amharic; the remaining 1.71% spoke all other primary languages reported. The majority of the inhabitants were Ethiopian Orthodox Christianity, with 70.69% of the population reporting they observed them, while 21.63% of the population said they were Protestant, 3.83% practiced traditional beliefs, 2.16% were Moslem, and 1.42% Roman Catholic.
