= Doreni =

Woreda in the Oromia region of Ethiopia

Coordinates: 9°41′N 38°51′E

Doreni is one of the woredas in the Oromia Region of Ethiopia. It was part of Yayu woreda.

== Demographics ==
The 2007 national census reported a total population for this woreda of 36,705, of whom 18,338 were men and 18,367 were women; none of its population were urban dwellers. The majority of the inhabitants practised Ethiopian Orthodox Christianity, with 54.99% of the population reporting they observed this belief, while 33.55% of the population said they were Moslem, and 11.31% were Protestant.
