= Ayra (woreda) =

District in Oromia Region, Ethiopia

- Woreda
- Location in Ethiopia
- Coordinates: 9°05′N 35°20′E
- Country: Ethiopia
- Region: Oromia
- Zone: West Welega

Population (2007)
  - Total: 47,537

Ayra is one of the woredas in the Oromia Region of Ethiopia. It is part of the West Welega Zone. It was separated from former Aira Gulliso woreda in November 1999. It is bounded by Gulliso in the north, Yubdo in southeast and Kelem Wollega Zone in the south and west. Aira is the administrative center.

== Demographics ==
The 2007 national census reported a total population for this woreda of 47,537 in 9,293 households, of whom 23,470 were men and 24,067 women; 6,079 or 12.79% of its population were urban dwellers. The overwhelming majority of the inhabitants (88.37%) observed Protestantism, while 6.96% observed Ethiopian Orthodox Christianity and 4.42% were Muslim.
