= Hurumu =

Woreda in the Oromia Region of Ethiopia

Hurumu is one of the woredas in the Oromia Region of Ethiopia. It was part of Illubabor Zone. The major town is Hurumu.

== Demographics ==
The 2007 national census reported a total population for this woreda of 42,667, of whom 21,309 were men and 21,358 were women; 4,519 or 10.59% of its population were urban dwellers. The majority of the inhabitants practised Ethiopian Orthodox Christianity, with 41.35% of the population reporting they observed this belief, while 34.32% of the population said they were Muslim, and 24.24% were Protestant.
