= Char char =

District in eastern Oromia state of Ethiopia

charchar carcar (Oromo)
- District
- Country: Ethiopia
- Region: (Oromia Region) Oromia
- Zone: West Hararghe
- Time zone: UTC+3 (EAT)

Char char is one of the Aanaas in the Oromia Region of Ethiopia. It is part of the West Hararghe Zone. It was separated from Guba Koricha Aanaa.

== Demographics ==
The 2007 national census reported a total population for this woreda of 81,646, of whom 42,030 were men and 39,616 were women; 6,491 or 7.95% of its population were urban dwellers. The majority of the inhabitants (72.12%) said they were Muslim, 15.58% of the population practiced Ethiopian Orthodox Christianity and 2.9% were Catholics.

== Notes ==
Anchar is one of the 18 woredas of West Hararge zone. It is located at a distance of 265 km away from the capital city, Addis Ababa. Geographically, Anchar is located at the coordination between 8030’ to 900’North Latitude and 4000’ to 40025’ East Longitude. The woreda altitude ranges between 960 and 3220 meters above sea level. With regard to land features, about 85% of its land is mainly rolling while forest exists in 8 kebeles of the woreda. The dominant cereals produced in the woreda are sorghum, maize, wheat, barley, oat, and teff. Moreover, haricot bean, chat, and coffee are the three permanent cash crops grown in the district (AWFAEDO, 2020). The capital city of the woreda is Cheleleka, located about 126 km away from the zonal capital city, chiro. The woreda is bordered with Gumbi Bordede and Awash Fentale in the North, Asako and Golelcha woreda in the south, Fentale woreda in the west, Darolebu, Habro, and Guba Koricha woreda in the south east directions (AWFAEDO, 2020). Anchar woreda has a total population of 106,051, (CSA, 2013) of which about 90.12% (95,579) live in rural area and the rest lives in urban areas. The woreda has infrastructure facilities such as electric power, modern telephone, banking facilities, educational, health, and other services that belong to public and private owners. With regard to electric access, out of the total population in the Anchar woreda, only 8.57% of households have access to electricity (AWFAEDO, 2020).
