= Gobu Seyo =

District in Ethiopia

Coordinates: 9.170°N 36.982°E

Gobu Seyo is one of the woredas in the Oromia region of Ethiopia. It is part of the Eastern Welega Zone and it was part of former Bila Seyo woreda. It is bounded by west Shewa Zone in the east, Sibu Sire in the west, Gudeya Bila in the north and Bonaya Boshe in the south.

== Demographics ==
As per the 2007 national census, the total population of this woreda is 41,012. The total population comprises 20,283 Males and 20,729 Females; 4,752 or 11.59% of its population are urban dwellers. The majority of the inhabitants observe Protestantism, with 40.81% reporting that as their religion, while 40.09% observe Ethiopian Orthodox Christianity, and 17.57% are Muslim.
