= Malka Soda =

- District
- Country: Ethiopia
- Region: Oromia
- Zone: Borena Zone

Malka Soda is a district in the West Guji Zone of Oromia Region in Ethiopia.
