= Gudeya Bila =

Woreda in Ethiopia

Gudeya Bila is one of the woredas in the Oromia Region of Ethiopia. It is part of the East Welega Zone and it was part of former Bila Seyo woreda. It is bounded by Abe Dongoro in the north, Gobu Seyo in the south, Horo Gudru Welega Zone in the east and Sibu Sire in the west.

== Demographics ==
The 2007 national census reported a total population for this woreda of 54,744, of whom 27,095 were men and 27,649 were women; 5,830 or 10.65% of its population are urban dwellers. The majority of the inhabitants observed Protestantism, with 48.96% reporting that as their religion, while 40.41% observed Ethiopian Orthodox Christianity, and 8.49% practiced traditional religions.
