= Gasera (woreda) =

Administrative division of Ethiopia

Gasera is one of the woredas in the Oromia Region of Ethiopia. It was part of former Gaserana Gololcha woreda and is now part of the Bale Zone. The administrative center for the woreda is Gasera.

== Demographics ==
The 2007 national census reported a total population for this woreda of 78,220, of whom 40,103 were men and 38,117 were women; 4,797 or 6.13% of its population were urban dwellers. The majority of the inhabitants said they were Muslim, with 75.28% of the population reporting they observed this belief, while 24.33% of the population practised Ethiopian Orthodox Christianity.
