= Bako, Oromia =

Town located in Oromia state of Ethiopia

Bako Baakkoo (Oromo)
- Town
- Location within Ethiopia Bako (Africa)
- Coordinates: 9°08′N 37°03′E
- Country: Ethiopia
- Region: Oromia
- Zone: West Shewa Zone
- Woreda: Bako Tibe

Population (2005)
  - Total: 18,641
- Time zone: UTC+3 (EAT)

Bako is a town in central Ethiopia. Located in the West Shewa Zone of the Oromia, on the all-weather highway between Addis Ababa (Finfinne) and Naqamte, this town has a longitude and latitude of 9°08′N 37°03′E with an elevation of 1,743 metres or 5,719 feet above sea level. Bako is the administrative center of Aanaa Bako Tibe.

During the Italian occupation, Bako is mentioned as having a medical clinic and a school. In 1948, Swedish missionaries opened a medical clinic in the town, which evolved into a mission station by 1953. By 1967, the town had phone service, as well as a primary and junior secondary schools; there was also a school for the blind, which had been moved from Addis Ababa to Bako 1961. The Ethiopian Institute of Agricultural Research opened a center in Bako in 1968, which is the national center for improving the yield of maize.

Based on figures from the Central Statistical Agency in 2005, Bako has an estimated total population of 18,641 of whom 9,370 are men and 9,271 women. The 1994 census reported this town had a total population of 10,422 of whom 5,082 were men and 5,340 women. It is the largest of three towns in Bako Tibe.

== Climate ==
Bako has a warm subtropical highland climate (Köppen Cwb) with a short dry season in December and January and a lengthy though not intense wet season covering the remaining ten months of the year.

Climate data for Bako, elevation 1,590 m (5,220 ft)
Month	Jan	Feb	Mar	Apr	May	Jun	Jul	Aug	Sep	Oct	Nov	Dec	Year
Average precipitation mm (inches)	16.0 (0.63)	29.0 (1.14)	61.0 (2.40)	69.0 (2.72)	130.0 (5.12)	199.0 (7.83)	269.0 (10.59)	198.0 (7.80)	151.0 (5.94)	55.0 (2.17)	34.0 (1.34)	16.0 (0.63)	1,227 (48.31)
Average relative humidity (%)	51	52	49	48	65	75	79	80	78	67	59	54	63
Source: FAO
