= Bale Gasegar =

Administrative division of Ethiopia

Coordinates: 7.75°N 40°E

Bale Gasegar is one of the woredas in Oromia Regional State of Ethiopia. It is part of the Arsi Zone. It was separated from Seru woreda.

== Demographics ==
The 207 national census reported a total population for this woreda of 73,952, of whom 36,419 were men and 37,533 were women; 5,913 or 8% of its population were urban dwellers. The majority of the inhabitants said they were Muslim, with 50.14% of the population reporting they observed this belief, while 49.52% of the population practised Ethiopian Orthodox Christianity.
