= Dire Enchini =

- District
- Country: Ethiopia
- Region: Oromia
- Zone: West Shewa Zone

Dire Enchini is a district of West Shewa Zone in Oromia Region of Ethiopia, about 40km south of Ambo town.
