= Sibu Sire =

Administrative division of Ethiopia

Coordinates: 9°05′N 36°50′E

Sibuu Siree is one of woredas in the Oromia Region of Ethiopia. Part of the Misraq (East) Welega Zone, Sibu Sire is bordered on the south by Wama Bonaya, on the west by Guto Wayu, and on the north and east by Bila Seyo. The administrative center of this woreda is Sire.

== Overview ==
The altitude of this woreda ranges from 1300 to 3020 meters above sea level; important peaks include Mount Chalsisi, Mount Adere and Mount Godomo. Rivers include the Aleltu, Ambelta, Gorochan, Indris, Leku, Chekorsa and the Jalele. A survey of the land in this woreda shows that 32.8% is owned by peasants while 67.2% is part of the Wama State Farm or unoccupied; of the land owned by peasants, 69.8% is cultivated land, 12% pasture, 10.1% swamp, and 8.1% forest. Cash crops include niger seeds. Coffee is another important cash crop; between 20 and 50 square kilometers are planted in it.

Industry in the woreda includes 12 grain mills and one edible oil mill. There were 14 Farmers Associations with 11,254 members and 6 Farmers Service Cooperatives with 6205 members. Sibu Sire has 25 kilometers of dry weather road and 49 all-weather road, for an average of road density of 65.3 kilometers per 1000 square kilometers. About 18.6% of the total population has access to drinking water. There are 20 primary schools in this woreda, seven providing education for grades 1-4 and 13 providing education for grades 1–8, and two secondary education schools, one providing education for grades 9-10 and the other for grades 11–12. Health services are provided by one health center, three clinics, and three health posts; these facilities are ill-equipped and under-staffed, making them insufficient to reach the entire population.

== Demographics ==
The 2007 national census published by the Central Statistical Agency reported a total population for this woreda of 102,228, of whom 50,717 were men and 51,511 were women; 10,243 or 10.02% of its population were urban dwellers. The majority of the inhabitants observed Protestantism, with 43.85% reporting that as their religion, while 41.15% observed Ethiopian Orthodox Christianity, and 13.68% were Moslem.

The 1994 national census reported a total population for this woreda of 68,919, of whom 33,587 were men and 35,332 women; 7,675 or 11.14% of its population were urban dwellers at the time. The two largest ethnic groups reported in Sibu Sire were the Oromo (86.06%), and the Amhara (12.24%); all other ethnic groups made up 1.7% of the population. Oromiffa was spoken as a first language by 86.73%, and 12.22% spoke Amharic; the remaining 1.05% spoke all other primary languages reported. The majority of the inhabitants were Ethiopian Orthodox Christianity, with 72.43% of the population reporting they observed this belief, while 17.32% of the population said they were Protestant, and 9.31% were Moslem.
