= Girma Seifu =

Ethiopian politician (born 1950)

Girma Seifu ግርማ ሰይፉ

Member of the House of Peoples' Representatives
- In office 2010–2015

Personal details
- Born: 1950 (age 75–76) Addis Ababa, Ethiopian Empire
- Party: Medrek
- Education: Yekatit 23 School; Medihanialem School
- Alma mater: Addis Ababa University (BBA)

Girma Seifu (Ge'ez: ግርማ ሰይፉ; born 1950) is an Ethiopian politician who was a member of the House of Peoples' Representatives from 2010 to 2015.

== Life ==
Girma Seifu was born in 1966 July 10 in Mesalemia area in Addis Ababa. He followed elementary class until grade 8 at Yekatit 23 School and completed high school in Medihanialem School. He then joined Addis Ababa University where he obtained a bachelor's degree and a master's degree in economics. After graduation, he joined the Federal Auditor General, where he was exposed to civil service work. He also worked in Ethiopian Social Rehabilitation and Development Fund, a World Bank-financed project and was also among employees who worked to establish the National HIV/AIDS Secretariat, which was also a World Bank-financed project. His final employment work was Pact Ethiopia as grant manager in USAID funded project. Since then, he founded a private consulting firm, known as GCT Consult and Training Services, and engaged in different research and field works. He also own a private business focus on Tourism. Recently (Since 2021) he took a government position at Addis Ababa City Administration and leading Investment Bureau for 3 and Half Years and then transferred to City Beautification and Green Development Bureau.

== Political career ==
Girma is a member of the House of Peoples' Representatives where he is the sole occupant of an opposition seat in the parliament. He has said he would not run in the 2015 elections and his party would not field candidates.

On 3 August 2018, Girma was promoted to the new Government Privatization Advisory Council to advise Prime Minister Abiy Ahmed concerning his new economic reforms.

Girma has contributed two books on Ethiopian Politics. The first one is How much Freedom Cost? (Amharic: የነፃነት ዋጋ ሰንት ነው?) and The Honerable’s` In Side the TPLF/EPRDF Parliament (Amharic: የተከበሩት በሕወሓት/ኢህአዴግ ፓርላማ). The first book on his biography and the tough road traveled during 2005 election. It tell us how to win election. The second book is focused on the up and downs of Ethiopian Parliament Stay especially the personalities of the members in the parliament. Both books have his political perspective in controversial issues in Ethiopian politics.

Girma is an active social media person and weekly contributor to the well-known weekly Magazine Fithe.
