= Yayu (woreda) =

Ethiopian administrative division

Coordinates: 8°10′N 36°00′E

Yayo is one of the districts in the Oromia Region of Ethiopia. Part of the Illubabor Zone, Yayo is bordered on the south by the Southern Nations, Nationalities and Peoples Region, on the west by Matu, on the north by Supena Sodo, on the east by Chora, and on the southeast by the Jimma Zone. Towns in Yayo include Elemo and Yayo. Doreni and Hurumu districts were part of Yayo district.

Coffee is an important cash crop in Yayo; over 50 square kilometres are planted with this crop. The largest share of the proposed Yayu Biosphere Reservation, a project of the Ethiopian Coffee Forest Forum, lies in this district .

== Demographics ==
The 2007 national census reported a total population for this district of 52,851, of whom 26,737 were men and 26,114 were women; 7,557 or 14.3% of its population were urban dwellers. The majority of the inhabitants were Moslem, with 57.21% of the population reporting they observed this belief, while 31.73% of the population said they practised Ethiopian Orthodox Christianity, and 10.93% were Protestant.

Based on figures published by the Central Statistical Agency in 2005, this district has an estimated total population of 118,181, of whom 58,292 are men and 59,889 are women; 14,407 or 12.2% of its population are urban dwellers, which is about the same as the Zone average of 12%. With an estimated area of 623.44 square kilometers, Yayo has an estimated population density of 189.6 people per square kilometre, which is greater than the Zone average of 72.3.

The 1994 national census reported a total population for this district of 83,579, of whom 41,316 were men and 42,263 women; 8,053 or 9.64% of its population were urban dwellers at the time. The three largest ethnic groups reported in Yayo were the Oromo (80.77%), the Amhara (15.33%), and the Tigrayan (2.54%); all other ethnic groups made up 1.36% of the population. Afan Oromo was spoken as a first language by 83.74%, 13.32% Amharic, and 2.39% Tigrinya; the remaining 0.55% spoke all other primary languages reported. The majority of the inhabitants professed Ethiopian Orthodox Christianity, with 54.06% of the population reporting they practice that belief, while 37.63% of the population said they were Muslim, and 7.66% were Protestant.
