= Seru =

Seru is a town in south-eastern Ethiopia. Seru is the capital of one of the 22 districts of the Arsi Zone of the Oromia Region. Seru has a latitude and longitude of 07°40′N 40°12′E with an elevation of 2,302 meters (7,552 ft) above sea level. It is the administrative center of Seru woreda. It is bordered by Amigna district in the north and northwest, Robe district in west and southwest, Bale Zone in the south and southeast and west Hararghe in the east. Having a total area of 2,412 square kilometres (931 sq mi), it is the largest district from the zone (11.48%). Seru district has 32 peasant association of which two (Seru Abas and Bele) are urban administrative units. Seru Abas town is the capital of the district, located at 297 kilometres (185 mi) from Finfine and 172 km from zonal capital, Asella town.

According to the information obtained from elder persons, Seru was recognized as a district 90 years ago. There were no written documents and reliable oral tells about the precise meaning of the word Seru. Based on information from local elders, the name of the town Seru originated from Afaan Oromo Seera, which means "rule and norm". Thus the term Seru is to indicate a place where rules and norms are discussed about. The elders commonly say "Seeruun Seera qabdi" in Afaan Oromo, which means the town Seru got rules and norms.

According to the Oromia Regional government, the only communication service currently in this town is radio communications for official purposes. Seru has no electricity. An UN-OCHA fact-finding mission visiting the town in 2003 described the community's water source as "quite original": the town has been built over a ground water reserve. The UN-OCHA report states, "Every compound has a hand-dug well, administration and school compounds as well. Water is reachable at 12 to 15 m depth". However, the report notes that the local people "have reported that the water table level has decreased over the past years."

Seru was mentioned in the Guido published by the Italians in 1938.

Based on figures from the Central Statistical Agency in 2005, Seru had an estimated total population of 3,082 of whom 1,422 were men and 1,660 were women. The 1994 census reported this town had a total population of 1,727 of whom 771 were men and 956 were women.
