= Amuru (woreda) =

District in Oromia Region, Ethiopia

Coordinates: 10°N 37°E

Amuru is one of the Ethiopian woredas (districts) located in the Oromia Region of Ethiopia.

== Geography ==
It is part of the Horo Gudru Welega Zone. It was part of former Amuru Jarte woreda.

The administrative center is Obora. The town of Amuru is in the woreda.

The Amuru woreda is known for its production of teff, barley, maize and other cereal crops.

== Demographics ==
The 2007 national census reported a total population for this woreda of 52,633.

4,892 or 9.3% of its population were urban dwellers.

26,490 were women, and 26,143 were men.

The majority of the inhabitants observed Ethiopian Orthodox Christianity, with 41.77% reporting that as their religion, while 38.53% were Protestants, 14.8% were Muslim, and 4.35% observed traditional beliefs. The two major ethnic groups living in the woreda are Oromo people and Amhara people.
