= Diga (woreda) =

- District
- Interactive map of Diga (woreda)
- Location within Ethiopia
- Coordinates: 9°00′N 36°20′E
- Country: Ethiopia
- Region: Oromia
- Zone: Misraq Welega Zone

Diga is one of the woredas in the Oromia Region of Ethiopia. It is part of the Misraq Welega Zone and it is part of former Diga Leka woreda.

== Demographics ==
The 2007 national census reported a total population for this woreda of 66,689, of whom 33,896 were men and 32,793 were women; 8,377 or 12.56% of its population are urban dwellers. The majority of the inhabitants observed Protestantism, with 50.28% reporting that as their religion, while 36.53% observed Ethiopian Orthodox Christianity, and 11.87% were Moslem.
