= Leka Dulecha =

Administrative division of Ethiopia

Leka Dulecha is one of the woredas in the Oromia Region of Ethiopia. It is part of the Misraq Welega Zone and it was part of former Diga Leka woreda. It's bounded by Nunu Kumba and Guto Gida in the east, Illubabor Zone in the west, Diga in the north, and Jimma Arjo to the south.

== Demographics ==
The 2007 national census reported a total population for this woreda of 72,057, of whom 35,479 were men and 36,578 were women; 4,056 or 5.63% of its population are urban dwellers. The majority of the inhabitants observed Protestantism, with 44.3% reporting that as their religion, while 43.15% observed Ethiopian Orthodox Christianity, and 8.58% were Moslem.
