= Ministry of Agriculture (Ethiopia) =

Government ministry of Ethiopia

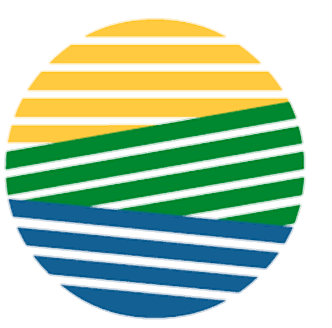

Agency overview
- Formed: 23 August 1995
- Jurisdiction: Government of Ethiopia
- Headquarters: Megenagna, Addis Ababa, Ethiopia; 9.015965°N 38.811895°E
- Annual budget: 129 million dollar (as of 2020)
- Agency executive: Addisu Arega
- Website: www.moa.gov.et/web/guest/psnp

The Ministry of Agriculture (MoA) is the Ethiopian government department which oversees the agricultural and rural development policies of Ethiopia on a federal level. Addisu Arega has appointed as the minister since 2025.

== History and overview ==
The powers and duties of the MoA include: conservation and use of forest and wildlife resources, food security, water use and small-scale irrigation, monitoring events affecting agricultural development and early warning system, promoting agricultural development, and establishing and providing agriculture and rural technology training.

The Ministry of Agriculture was established on 23 August 1995 with the adoption of Proclamation 4-1995 which also established the other 14 original Ministries of the Federal Democratic Republic of Ethiopia. On 13 January 2004, Proclamation No. 300/2004 merged this Ministry with the Ministry of Rural Development. The current Minister is Girma Amente (PhD).

== See also ==
- Agriculture in Ethiopia
- Resettlement and villagization in Ethiopia
