= East Welega Zone =

Zone in Oromia Region of Ethiopia

Coordinates: 9°20′N 37°00′E

Map of the regions and zones of Ethiopia

East Welega (Oromo: Wallagga Bahaa) is one of the zones in the central Oromia Region of Ethiopia. This administrative division acquired its name from the former province of Welega. Towns and cities in this zone include Nekemte.

East Welega is bounded on the southwest by Illubabor, on the west by the Didessa River which separates it from West Welega, on the northwest and north by the Benishangul-Gumuz Region, on the northeast by Horo Guduru Welega Zone, on the east by West Shewa, and on the southeast by the Gibe River which separates it from Jimma. The highest point in this zone is Mount Garochan (3,276 m).

The Central Statistical Agency (CSA) reported that 40,606 tons of coffee were produced in West and East Welega combined in the year ending in 2005, based on inspection records from the Ethiopian Coffee and Tea authority. This represents 35.3% of the Region's output and 17.9% of Ethiopia's total output.

== Demographics ==
Based on the 2007 Census conducted by the CSA, this Zone has a total population of 1,213,503, of whom 606,379 are men and 607,124 women; with an area of 12,579.77 square kilometers, East Welega has a population density of 96.46. While 162,854 or 7.72% are urban inhabitants, a further 28 persons are pastoralists. A total of 255,534 households were counted in this Zone, which results in an average of 4.75 persons to a household, and 246,680 housing units. The two largest ethnic groups reported in East Welega were the Oromo (87.74%) and the Amhara (10.89%); all other ethnic groups made up 1.37% of the population. Oromo was spoken as a first language by 88.13% and 10.85% spoke Amharic; the remaining 1.02% spoke all other primary languages reported. The majority of the inhabitants professed Protestantism, with 48.42% of the population having reported they practiced that belief, while 37.04% of the population practiced Ethiopian Orthodox Christianity and 12.09% were Muslim.

The 1994 national census reported a total population for this Zone of 1,253,432 in 252,821 households, of whom 616,565 were men and 636,867 women; 138,736 or 11.07% of its population were urban dwellers at the time. The two largest ethnic groups reported in East Welega were the Oromo (88.5%), and the Amhara (10.47%); all other ethnic groups made up 1.03% of the population. Oromo was spoken as a first language by 89.37%, and 9.9% spoke Amharic; the remaining 0.73% spoke all other primary languages reported. The majority of the inhabitants professed Ethiopian Orthodox Christianity, with 61.74% of the population having reported they practiced that belief, while 16.44% of the population said they were Protestant, 12.44% held traditional beliefs, and 8.27% were Muslim.

== Crime ==
- Abo church massacre, 5 March 2021
