= Babo Gambela =

Administrative division of Ethiopia

Coordinates: 9.5°N 35.16°E

Babo Gambel is one of the 180 woredas of the Oromia Region of Ethiopia. Part of the West Welega Zone, it is bounded by Jarso and Nejo in the east, Mana Sibu and Kiltu Kara in the north, Begi in the west, Kondala and Kelem Welega Zone in the south. This woreda was created from a portion of Jarso woreda; Babo Dabeka is its administrative center.

== Demographics ==
The 2007 national census reported a total population for this woreda of 60,513 in 11,283 households, of whom 30,689 were men and 29,824 were women; 3,717 or 6.14% of its population were urban dwellers. The highest proportion of the inhabitants (44.34%) observed Islam, while 32.38% observed Ethiopian Orthodox Christianity, and 23.02% were Protestants.
