= Gawo Kebe =

District of Oromia Region, Ethiopia

Gawo Qebe is one of the woredas in the Oromia Region of Ethiopia. It is part of the Kelem Welega Zone and is bordered on the east and north by Mirab Welega Zone, on the west by Jimma Horo, on the south by Yemalogi Welele and on the southeast by Dale Wabera. The administrative center of this woreda is Kebe. Gawo Qebe was separated from former Gawo Dale woreda.

== Demographics ==
The 2007 national census reported a total population for this woreda of 65,396, of whom 32,966 were men and 32,430 were women; 1,731 or 2.65% of its population were urban dwellers. The majority of the inhabitants observed Islam, with 39.77% reporting that as their religion, while 38.79% were Protestants, and 21.27% observed Ethiopian Orthodox Christianity.
