= Metu Zuria =

District in Oromia Region, Ethiopia

Coordinates: 8°15′N 35°40′E

Metu Zuria is a woreda in Oromia Region, Ethiopia. Part of the Illubabor Zone, Metu Zuria is bordered on the south by Ale, on the southwest by Bure, on the west by the Kelem Welega Zone, on the north by Darimu, on the northeast by Supena Sodo, on the east by Yayu and on the southeast by Southern Nations, Nationalities and Peoples Region. The former Metu woreda was separated for Bicho, Bilo Nopha and Metu Zuria woredas and Metu Town.

== Overview ==
Rivers in this woreda include the Sor. A local landmark is the Sor River waterfalls, located 13 kilometers southeast of the town of Metu, near the village of Bechu; at least one travel guide describes these falls as "beautiful". Coffee is an important cash crop of Metu; over 50 square kilometers are planted with this crop.

Ethio-Wetland, a non-governmental organization, assisted by funding from the Japanese Embassy, in February 2009 dug 32 hand-dug wells, which increased zonal water supply coverage from 30% to 50%. Further Ethio-Wetland, which is also engaged in water and soil conservation, wetland care, and providing seeds and agriculture tools, was completing the digging of five more wells, which would meet the needs of about 2,000 more people.

== Demographics ==
The 2007 national census reported a total population for this woreda of 61,954, of whom 30,982 were men and 30,972 were women; none of its population were urban dwellers. The majority of the inhabitants were Protestant, with 40.67% of the population reporting they observed this belief, while 30.37% of the population said they practised Ethiopian Orthodox Christianity, and 28.75% were Moslem.

Based on figures published by the Central Statistical Agency in 2005, this woreda has an estimated total population of 154,927, of whom 77,565 are men and 77,362 are women; 38,217 or 24.67% of its population are urban dwellers, which is greater than the Zone average of 12%. With an estimated area of 1,461.41 square kilometers, Metu has an estimated population density of 106 people per square kilometer, which is greater than the Zone average of 72.3.

The 1994 national census reported a total population for this woreda of 106,294, of whom 52,925 were men and 53,369 women; 21,350 or 20.09% of its population were urban dwellers at the time. The three largest ethnic groups reported in Metu were the Oromo (86.25%), the Amhara (9.69%), and the Tigrayan (1.61%); all other ethnic groups made up 2.45% of the population. Oromiffa was spoken as a first language by 88.49%, 8.92% Amharic, and 1.35% Tigrinya; the remaining 1.24% spoke all other primary languages reported. The plurality of the inhabitants professed Ethiopian Orthodox Christianity, with 46.89% of the population reporting they practiced that belief, while 35.18% of the population said they were Muslim, and 17.5% were Protestant.
