= Hawa Welele =

Coordinates: 8°35′N 35°05′E

Hawa Welele was one of the woredas in the Oromia Region of Ethiopia. Part of the Mirab Welega Zone, Hawa Welele was bordered on the south by Sayo, on the west by Anfillo, on the northwest by Jimma Gidami, on the north and east by Gawo Dale, and on the southeast by the Illubabor Zone. The administrative center of this woreda was Rob Gebeya; other towns in Hawa Welele included Tejo. Hawa Welele was separated for Hawa Gelan and Yemalogi Welele woredas.

== Overview ==
The highest point in this woreda, and in the Zone, is Mount Welel (3312 meters). A survey of the land in Hawa Welele shows that 53.99% is cultivated or arable, 14.72% pasture, 10.39% forest, and 22.22% infrastructure or other uses. 5,864 hectares of the land considered forest is covered by the Yemalogi Forest, which is a part of the Gergedda forest. Important crops include corn, sorghum, finger millet, sesame, pepper, and navy beans. Land is tilled using indigenous variety of plough drawn by oxen. Coffee is an important cash crop of this woreda; between 2,000 and 5,000 hectares is planted with this crop.

There are 49 primary schools, and 1 secondary education schools in this woreda. Health services are provided by one hospital, one health center, 10 clinics, and nine health posts; most of these facilities are located in urban areas.

Hawa Welele was selected by the Ministry of Agriculture and Rural Development in 2003 as an area for voluntary resettlement for farmers from overpopulated areas and this woreda became the home for a total of 7006 heads of households and 20,053 total family members in that year. Hawa Welele was selected again the next year and became the new homes of another 11,369 heads of households and 56,625 total family members.

== Demographics ==
Based on figures published by the Central Statistical Agency in 2005, this woreda has an estimated total population of 113,604, of whom 56,943 are men and 56,661 are women; 5,347 or 4.71% of its population are urban dwellers, which is less than the Zone average of 10.9%. With an estimated area of 1,329.14 square kilometers, Hawa Welele has an estimated population density of 85.5 people per square kilometer, which is less than the Zone average of 91.7.

The 1994 national census reported a total population for this woreda of 81,780 in 15,289 households, of whom 40,972 were men and 40,808 were women; 2,986 or 3.65% of its population were urban dwellers. The two largest ethnic groups reported in Hawa Welele were the Oromo (89.44%), and the Amhara (10.3%); all other ethnic groups made up 0.26% of the population. Oromiffa was spoken as a first language by 89.58%, and 10.25% Amharic; the remaining 0.17% spoke all other primary languages reported. The majority of the inhabitants observed Ethiopian Orthodox Christianity, with 71.36% reporting that as their religion, while 20.37% were Muslim, and 7.37% Protestant.
