= Dale Sedi =

District in Ethiopia

Dale Sedi is one of the woredas in the Oromia Region of Ethiopia. It is part of the Kelem Welega Zone. Dale Sedi is bordered on the south by the Illubabor Zone, on the west by Dale Wabera, on the north by Mirab Welega Zone, and on the east by Lalo Kile. The administrative center of this woreda is Haro Sebu. Dale Sedi was separated from former Dale Lalo woreda.

== Demographics ==
The 2007 national census reported a total population for this woreda of 74,039, of whom 36,752 were men and 37,287 were women; 4,721 or 6.38% of its population were urban dwellers. The majority of the inhabitants were Protestants, with 56.29% reporting that as their religion, while 25.56% observed Islam, and 17.99% observed Ethiopian Orthodox Christianity.
