= Jimma Gidami =

Former district in Oromia Region, Ethiopia

Coordinates: 8°45′N 34°40′E

Jimma Gidami was a woreda in Oromia Region, Ethiopia. Part of the Mirab (West) Welega Zone, Jimma Gidami was bordered on the south by Anfillo, on the west by South Sudan, on the northwest by the Benishangul-Gumuz Region, on the north by Begi, on the east by Gawo Dale, and on the east by Hawa Welele. Towns in Jimma Gidami included Gidami and Nunu Kumba. It was separated for Gidami and Jimma Horo woredas.

Landmarks included Jubal Gimi, a mountain in the western part of Jimma Gidami. Coffee was an important cash crop of this woreda. Over 50 square kilometers were planted with this crop.

== Demographics ==
Based on figures published by the Central Statistical Agency in 2005, this woreda has an estimated total population of 124,530, of whom 62,616 are men and 61,914 are women; 7,041 or 5.65% of its population are urban dwellers, which is less than the Zone average of 10.9%. With an estimated area of 3,412.50 square kilometers, Jimma Gidami has an estimated population density of 36.5 people per square kilometer, which is less than the Zone average of 91.7.

The 1994 national census reported a total population for this woreda of 89,446 in 16,197 households, of whom 44,667 were men and 44,779 were women; 3,934 or 4.4% of its population were urban dwellers. The largest ethnic group reported in Jimma Gidami was the Oromo (98.9%). Oromiffa was spoken as a first language by 99.25%, and 1.69% spoke Amharic; the remaining 0.22% spoke all other primary languages reported. The majority of the inhabitants observed Ethiopian Orthodox Christianity, with 70.89% reporting that as their religion, while 14.99% were Muslim, and 13.6% Protestant.
