= Dale Lalo =

Coordinates: 8°45′N 35°20′E

Dale Lalo (also known as Dale Sedi) was one of the 180 Aanaas in the Oromia of Ethiopia. Part of the West Welega Zone, Dale Lalo was bordered on the south by the Illubabor Zone, on the west by Gawo Dale, on the north by Ayra Guliso, on the northeast by Yubdo, and on the east by Nole Kaba. Towns in Dale Lalo included Alem and Teferi. It was separated for Dale Sedi and Lalo Kile woredas.

A survey of the land in Dale Lalo shows that 46.53% is cultivated or arable, 15.96% pasture, 5.1% forest, and 32.4% infrastructure or other uses. There are 30 primary schools, and 1 secondary education schools in this woreda. Health services are provided by one health center, four clinics, and five health posts; most of these facilities are located in urban areas.

== Demographics ==
Based on figures published by the Central Statistical Agency in 2005, this woreda has an estimated total population of 132,554, of whom 67,743 are men and 64,811 are women; 7,741 or 5.84% of its population are urban dwellers, which is less than the Zone average of 10.9%. With an estimated area of 1,089.22 square kilometers, Dale Lalo has an estimated population density of 121.7 people per square kilometer, which is greater than the Zone average of 91.7.

The 1994 national census reported a total population for this woreda of 95,154 in 17,534 households, of whom 46,706 were men and 48,448 were women; 4,323 or 4.54% of its population were urban dwellers. The two largest ethnic groups reported in Dale Lalo were the Oromo (96.72%), and the Amhara (2.94%); all other ethnic groups made up 0.34% of the population. Oromiffa was spoken as a first language by 97.27%, and 2.52% Amharic; the remaining 0.21% spoke all other primary languages reported. The majority of the inhabitants were Protestant, with 41.98% reporting that as their religion, while 41.14% observed Ethiopian Orthodox Christianity, 15.52% were Muslim and 1.06% Catholic.
