= Yemalogi Welele =

Woreda of Ethiopia

Yemalogi Welele is one of the woredas in the Oromia Region of Ethiopia. Part of the Kelem Welega Zone, Yemalogi Welele is bordered on the south by Hawa Gelan and Sayo, on the west by Anfilo and Gidami, on the northwest by Jimma Horo, on the north by Gawo Kebe, and on east by the Dale Wabera. The administrative center of this woreda is Tejo. Hawa Gelan was separated from former Hawa Welele woreda.

== Demographics ==
The 2007 national census reported a total population for this woreda of 51,392, of whom 25,783 were men and 25,609 were women; 1,605 or 3.12% of its population were urban dwellers. The majority of the inhabitants were Protestants, with 54.04% reporting that as their religion, while 23.77% observed Ethiopian Orthodox Christianity, and 22.05% observed Islam.
