= Yubdo =

District in Oromia Region, Ethiopia

Coordinates: 8°50′N 35°40′E

Yubdo or Jubdo is a woreda in Oromia Region, Ethiopia. Part of the West Welega Zone, Yubdo is bordered on the south by Nole Kaba, on the west by Kelem Welega Zone, on the northwest by Ayra Guliso, on the northeast by Lalo Asabi, on the east by Gimbi, and on the southeast by Haru. The administrative center of this woreda is Yubdo; other towns in Yubdo include Ganji.

Rivers in this woreda include the Karsa, a tributary of the Kobara. Coffee is an important cash crop of this woreda. Over 50 square kilometers are planted with this crop. Platinum occurs in this woreda, developed on serpentinized dunite, locally named Birbirite, after the Birbir River; the platinum probably being remobilized and concentrated by hydrothermal alteration in conjunction with shearing. The total reserves are about 12 tons, with an average grade of 0.34 gram/ton. An Italian miner named Alberto Prasso received a concession to mine this deposit in 1924. Prasso established a company in Paris, Société Minière des Concessions Prasso en Abyssinie, which employed as many as 2,600 workers and extracted 700 ounces in 1926, increased the annual output to 8,050 ounces in 1932, which decreased to 6,300 ounces in 1933.

== Demographics ==
The 2007 national census reported a total population for this woreda of 38,858 in 7,581 households, of whom 19,268 were men and 19,590 women; 2,330 or 6% of its population were urban dwellers. The majority of the inhabitants observed Protestantism, with 68.27% reporting that as their religion, while 27.31% observed Ethiopian Orthodox Christianity, and 4.28% were Muslim.

Based on figures published by the Central Statistical Agency in 2005, this woreda has an estimated total population of 97,219, of whom 49,846 are men and 47,373 are women; 4,702 or 4.84% of its population are urban dwellers, which is less than the Zone average of 10.9%. With an estimated area of 624.22 square kilometers, Yubdo has an estimated population density of 155.7 people per square kilometer, which is greater than the Zone average of 91.7.

The 1994 national census reported a total population for this woreda of 69,969 in 12,393 households, of whom 34,260 were men and 35,699 were women; 2,630 or 3.76% of its population were urban dwellers. The largest ethnic group reported in Yubdo was the Oromo (99.45%). Oromiffa was spoken as a first language by 99.73%. The majority of the inhabitants were Protestant, with 59.84% reporting that as their religion, while 31.98% observed Ethiopian Orthodox Christianity, 5.59% were Muslim, and 1.19% observed traditional beliefs.
