= Qelem Wollega massacre =

2022 ethnic cleansing in Oromia Region, Ethiopia

- Part of the OLA insurgency
- Kellem (Ethiopia)
- Location: Kelam Welega Zone, Hawa Gelan, Oromia, Ethiopia
- Date: July 4, 2022; 12:00 AM – 4:00 AM
- Target: Amhara civilians
- Deaths: 150-160+ (per BBC); 308 (per Amhara Association of America); 168(per Ethiopian government)
- Injuries: 36
- Perpetrators: Oromo Liberation Army (alleged by Ethiopia); Ethiopian government (alleged by OLA)

On July 4, 2022, alleged Oromo Liberation Army militants killed hundreds of civilians in Kelam Welega Zone, Oromia in Ethiopia. The massacre sparked condemnation from Ethiopian prime minister Abiy Ahmed, and was the second mass killing in Oromia region after the Gimbi massacre just a week prior. Qelem is also known as Kellem.

== Background ==
Following a resurgence in fighting during the Tigray War, the Oromo Liberation Army aligned themselves with the Tigray People's Liberation Front to establish a new Ethiopian government against Abiy Ahmed. In Oromia, clashes between the OLA and Ethiopia intensified in the weeks preceding the massacre, although the Ethiopian government stated five days before the massacre that "Kelem Welega, West Welega, and Horo Gudru Welega zones were fully under the control of the integrated security force." Just two days before, however, OLA militants killed over four hundred Amhara civilians in Gimbi.

Prior to the massacre, local Amhara officials requested aid from the Hawa Gelana Woreda administration, although none arrived.

== Massacre ==
According to eyewitness, the massacre began at 11:30 PM on July 3, when OLA troops entered an Amhara-populated village known as Village 20. Local militias did not respond to the incident because shootings and clashes were commonplace in the area, and residents believed the gunfire was normal. When villagers awoke, many of the bodies were of children, women, and the elderly. Residents stated that people in Village 20 were marched out to the forest and were bombed, leaving no survivors. Amhara civilians were selectively targeted from the village.

The Amhara Association of America claimed the attack took place with three groups of militants - the first group came with machine guns and provided security for the other two groups, the second group were the executioners of civilians, and the third group "engaged in looting and property destruction." Between 140 and 200 Amhara civilians from Village 20 were killed, with the highest toll being 223. Survivors from Village 20 stated that "hundreds" of prisoners were taken by the OLA, some of which were executed while marching to Village 21.

While at the predominantly-Oromo Village 21, eighty-five Amhara civilians were killed. Some of the prisoners the OLA took included district and administration officials, humanitarian workers, and other civilians. The Oromo Special Forces could not confirm their health status.

== Aftermath and Reactions ==
Prime Minister Abiy Ahmed stated that "Citizens in Oromia region, Kelem Welega zone, have been massacred." immediately following the attacks, with no specifics.

Civilians speaking to BBC stated that during the attack, no Ethiopian special forces arrived on scene until 6:00 AM, although they were stationed just 20 kilometers away. The Ethiopian army and local government forces did not arrive until 8:00 AM, although "no action was taken". Oromia Special Forces and the Hawa Gelana administration restricted civilians from photographing the massacre, and telecommunications remained defunct in the town for a week afterward.

== See also ==
- Gimbi massacre
- Hachalu Hundessa riots
- Gawa Qanqa massacre
