= Lalo Kile =

District in Oromia, Ethiopia

Lalo Kile is one of the woredas in the Oromia Region of Ethiopia. It is part of the Kelem Wollega Zone. Lalo Kile is bordered on the south by the Ilu Aba Bor Zone, on the west by Dale Sadi, and on the north and east by West Wollega Zone. The administrative center of this woreda is Lalo. Lalo Kile was separated from former Dale Lalo woreda.

== Demographics ==
The 2007 national census reported a total population for this woreda of 51,448, of whom 25,410 were men and 26,038 were women; 2,805 or 5.45% of its population were urban dwellers. The majority of the inhabitants were Protestants, with 73.79% reporting that as their religion, while 19.28% observed Ethiopian Orthodox Christianity, and 5.78% observed Islam.
