= Haru (woreda) =

District of Oromia Region, Ethiopia

Coordinates: 8°50′N 36°00′E

Haru is one of the 180 Aanaas in Oromia Region of Ethiopia. Part of the West Welega Zone, Haru is bordered on the south by Nole Kaba, on the southwest by Dale Lalo, on the west by Yubdo, on the north by Gimbi, on the east by an exclave of the Benishangul-Gumuz Region, and on the southeast by the Illubabor Zone. Towns in Haru include Guyi, Chonge and Guyi Abo.

Coffee is an important cash crop of this woreda. Over 50 square kilometers are planted with this crop.

== Demographics ==
The 2007 national census reported a total population for this woreda of 67,262 in 13,332 households, of whom 33,178 were men and 34,084 women; 4,870 or 7.24% of its population were urban dwellers. The majority of the inhabitants observed Protestantism, with 72.09% reporting that as their religion, while 25.06% observed Ethiopian Orthodox Christianity, and 2.42% were Muslim.

Based on figures published by the Central Statistical Agency in 2005, this woreda has an estimated total population of 74,657, of whom 38,375 are men and 36,282 are women; 5,988 or 8.02% of its population are urban dwellers, which is less than the Zone average of 10.9%. With an estimated area of 448.75 square kilometers, Haru has an estimated population density of 166.4 people per square kilometer, which is greater than the Zone average of 91.7.

The 1994 national census reported this woreda's population at 53,324 in 9,492 households, of whom 26,031 were men and 27,293 women; 3,359 or 6.3% of its population were urban dwellers. The largest ethnic groups reported in Haru was the Oromo (99.26%). Oromiffa was spoken as the first language by 99.61%. The majority of the inhabitants observed Ethiopian Orthodox Christianity, with 54.33% reporting that as their religion, while 40.21% were Protestant, 2.95% were Muslim, and 1.81% observed traditional beliefs.
