= Bure, Oromia (woreda) =

District in Oromia Region, Ethiopia

Coordinates: 8°15′N 35°20′E

Bure is one of the woredas in the Oromia Region of Ethiopia. Part of the Illubabor Zone, Bure is bordered on the south by Nono, on the southwest by the Gambela Region, on the west by the Kelem Welega Zone, on the northeast by Metu, and on the southeast by Ale; the Birbir River defines the west and north boundaries. Towns in Bure include Bure and Sibo. Huka Halu woreda was separated from Bure.

Although coffee is an important cash crop of this woreda, less than 20 square kilometers are planted with this crop.

== Demographics ==
The 2007 national census reported a total population for this woreda of 50,841, of whom 25,312 were men and 25,529 were women; 5,477 or 10.77% of its population were urban dwellers. The majority of the inhabitants practised Ethiopian Orthodox Christianity, with 37.59% of the population reporting they observed this belief, while 30.9% of the population said they were Moslem, and 30.73% were Protestant.

Based on figures published by the Central Statistical Agency in 2005, this woreda has an estimated total population of 78,043, of whom 39,953 are men and 38,090 are women; 9,565 or 12.26% of its population are urban dwellers, which is about the same as the Zone average of 12%. With an estimated area of 1,496.41 square kilometers, Bure has an estimated population density of 52.2 people per square kilometer, which is less than the Zone average of 72.3.

The 1994 national census reported a total population for this woreda of 55,193 in 12,991 households, of whom 27,037 were men and 28,156 women; 5,356 or 9.7% of its population were urban dwellers at the time. The four largest ethnic groups reported in Bure were the Oromo (82.37%), the Amhara (10.62%), the Tigrayan (2.96%), and the Kambaata (2.38%); all other ethnic groups made up 1.67% of the population. Oromiffa was spoken as a first language by 85.47%, 8.21% Amharic, 2.66% Tigrinya, and 2.39% Kambaata; the remaining 1.27% spoke all other primary languages reported. The majority of the inhabitants professed Ethiopian Orthodox Christianity, with 65.42% of the population reporting they practiced that belief, while 24.62% of the population said they were Muslim, and 8.47% were Protestant.
