= Gawo Dale =

Former district in Oromia Region, Ethiopia

Coordinates: 9°00′N 35°10′E

Gawo Dale was one of the woredas in the Oromia Region of Ethiopia. Part of the Mirab Welega Zone, Gawo Dale was bordered on the south by Hawa Welele, on the west by Jimma Gidami, on the northwest by Begi, on the north by Jarso, on the northeast by Ayra Guliso, on the east by Dale Lalo, and on the southeast by the Illubabor Zone. The administrative center of this woreda was Kake; other towns in Gawo Dale included Chanka. It was separated for Dale Wabera and Gawo Kebe woredas.

== Overview ==
Elevations in this woreda range from 1150 to 3330 meters above sea level; the highest point is Guri Maryam. Rivers include the Qeto. Natural vegetation covers 444.34 square kilometers of Gawo Dale and 172.18 square kilometers are covered by forest. It has been estimated that 281.15 square kilometers are arable. Important crops produced include corn, sorghum, finger millet, sesame, pepper, and navy beans. Land is tilled using indigenous plough drawn by oxen. Coffee is an important cash crop of this woreda; over 50 square kilometers are planted with this crop.

There are 65 primary schools in this woreda and 2 secondary education schools. Health services are provided by one health center, 11 clinics, and 10 health posts; most of these facilities are located in urban areas.

== Demographics ==
Based on figures published by the Central Statistical Agency in 2005, this woreda has an estimated total population of 155,984, of whom 78,699 are men and 77,285 are women; 13,422 or 8.60% of its population are urban dwellers, which is less than the Zone average of 10.9%. With an estimated area of 1,949.85 square kilometers, Gawo Dale has an estimated population density of 80 people per square kilometer, which is less than the Zone average of 91.7.

The 1994 national census reported a total population for this woreda of 111,251 in 20,345 households, of whom 55,276 were men and 55,975 were women; 7,495 or 6.74% of its population were urban dwellers. The two largest ethnic groups reported in Gawo Dale were the Oromo (93.1%), and the Amhara (6.26%); all other ethnic groups made up 0.67% of the population. Oromiffa was spoken as a first language by 91.91%, and 7.41% Amharic; the remaining 0.41% spoke all other primary languages reported. The majority of the inhabitants observed Ethiopian Orthodox Christianity, with 46.09% reporting that as their religion, while 28.77% were Muslim, and 24.49% Protestant.
