= Hawa Gelan =

Administrative division of Ethiopia

Hawa Gelan is one of the woredas in the Oromia Region of Ethiopia. Part of the Kelem Welega Zone, Hawa Gelan is bordered on the south and southwest by Sayo, on the north by Yemalogi Welele, on the northeast by Dale Wabera, and on the south and southeast by the Illubabor Zone. The administrative center of this woreda is Gaba Robi. Hawa Gelan was separated from former Hawa Welele woreda.

== Demographics ==
The 2007 national census reported a total population for this woreda of 95,976, of whom 49,312 were men and 46,664 were women; 5,562 or 5.8% of its population were urban dwellers. The majority of the inhabitants observed Islam, with 45.43% reporting that as their religion, while 32.42% observed Ethiopian Orthodox Christianity, 20.48% were Protestants, and 1.31% were Catholic.
