= Gawa Qanqa massacre =

November 2020 school attack in West Wolega Zone of Oromia Region in Ethiopia

- Part of the Oromo conflict
- Gawa Qanqa (Ethiopia)
- Location: 09°11′53″N 34°52′50″E; Gawa Qanqa, West Welega Zone, Ethiopia
- Date: 2 November 2020
- Target: Amharas
- Attack type: Mass shooting; Ethnic terrorism; School shooting
- Weapon: Handgun
- Deaths: 32–54
- Injuries: 0
- Perpetrators: (Disputed) (Ethiopia) Ethiopian Government blamed Oromo Liberation Army; OLA denied responsibility

On November 2nd, 2020, allegedly a group of up to 60 gunmen attacked a schoolyard in the village of Gawa Qanqa in the Guliso District of West Welega Zone in the Oromia Region of Ethiopia, killing 32-54 people. The state-run Ethiopian Human Rights Commission said the attack had targeted people of the Amhara ethnic group. 200 people were gathered by an armed group for a meeting and then were shot at by the armed group. Soldiers had reportedly left the area hours before the attack. The Oromia Regional Government blamed the Oromo Liberation Army for the attack, who denied responsibility. Prime Minister Abiy Ahmed denounced the attack and promised a thorough investigation. Ethnic violence has increased since he took office.

== See also ==
- Gimbi massacre
- Hachalu Hundessa riots
- Qelem Wollega massacre
