= Supena Sodo =

District in Oromia Region, Ethiopia

Coordinates: 8°30′N 35°50′E

Supena Sodo ("Supe and Sodo") is one of the 180 woredas in the Oromia Region of Ethiopia. Part of the Illubabor Zone, Supena Sodo is bordered on the south by Yayu, on the southwest by Metu, on the west by Darimu, on the north by the Mirab Welega Zone, on the northeast by Dega, and on the southeast by Chora. Towns in Supena Sodo include Alge, Sache and Supe.

Coffee is an important cash crop of this woreda. Over 50 square kilometers are planted with this crop.

== Demographics ==
Based on figures published by the Central Statistical Agency in 2005, this woreda has an estimated total population of 82,638, of whom 42,450 were males and 40,188 were females; 7,134 or 8.63% of its population are urban dwellers, which is less than the Zone average of 12%. With an estimated area of 943.44 square kilometers, Supena Sodo has an estimated population density of 87.6 people per square kilometer, which is greater than the Zone average of 72.3.

The 1994 national census reported a total population for this woreda of 58,938 in 12,658 households, of whom 28,772 were men and 30,166 women; 3,991 or 6.77% of its population were urban dwellers at the time. The three largest ethnic groups reported in Supena Sodo were the Oromo (93.74%), the Amhara (5.01%), and the Tigrayan (0.76%); all other ethnic groups made up 0.49% of the population. Oromiffa was spoken as a first language by 96.34%, 2.82% Amharic, and 0.68% Tigrinya; the remaining 0.16% spoke all other primary languages reported. The majority of the inhabitants professed Ethiopian Orthodox Christianity, with 58.7% of the population reporting they practiced that belief, while 26.1% of the population said they were Muslim, 13.3% were Protestant, and 1.41% observed traditional beliefs.
