= Jarso (Welega) =

District in Oromia Region, Ethiopia

Coordinates: 9°20′N 35°15′E

Jarso is a woreda, or district, in Oromia Region, Ethiopia. Part of the West Welega Zone, Jarso is bordered on the south by Ayra Guliso, on the southwest by Gawo Dale, on the west by Begi, on the north by Mana Sibu, on the northeast by Nejo, and on the southeast by Boji. Towns in Jarso include Dabeka and Geba Dafino.

Although coffee is an important cash crop of this woreda, less than 20 square kilometers are planted with this crop.

== Demographics ==
The 2007 national census reported a total population for this woreda of 48,561 in 8,967 households, of whom 24,003 were men and 24,558 women; 3,625 or 7.47% of its population were urban dwellers. The majority of the inhabitants (57.34%) observed Protestantism, while 37.73% observed Ethiopian Orthodox Christianity, and 4.73% were Muslim.

Based on figures published by the Central Statistical Agency in 2005, this woreda has an estimated total population of 109,552, of whom 54,789 are men and 54,763 are women; 6,739 or 6.15% of its population are urban dwellers, which is less than the Zone average of 10.9%. With an estimated area of 1,345.19 square kilometers, Jarso has an estimated population density of 81.4 people per square kilometer, which is less than the Zone average of 91.7.

The 1994 national census reported a total population for this woreda of 78,603 in 13,648 households, of whom 39,480 were men and 39,123 were women; 3,770 or 4.8% of its population were urban dwellers. The two largest ethnic groups reported in Jarso were the Oromo (95.07%), the Amhara (3.71%), and the Mao (0.89%); all other ethnic groups made up 0.33% of the population. Oromiffa was spoken as a first language by 94.48%, 4.39% Amharic, and 0.88% spoke Mao; the remaining 0.25% spoke all other primary languages reported. The majority of the inhabitants observed Ethiopian Orthodox Christianity, with 49.72% reporting that as their religion, while 26.54% were Protestant, and 23.48% Muslim.
