= Nole Kaba =

Administrative division of Ethiopia

Coordinates: 8°45′N 35°45′E

Nole Kaba is one of the woredas in the Oromia region of Ethiopia. Part of the West Welega Zone, Nole Kaba is bordered on the south by the Illubabor Zone, on the west by Kelem Welega Zone, on the northwest by Yubdo, and on the northeast by Haru. Towns in Nole Kaba include Bube. Sayo Nole woreda was separated from Nole Kaba.

Coffee is an important cash crop of this woreda. Over 50 square kilometers are planted with this crop.

== Demographics ==
The 2007 national census reported the woreda's population as 59,826 in 12,004 households, of whom 29,189 were men and 30,637 women; 5,096 or 8.52% of its population were urban dwellers. The majority of the inhabitants (77.04%) observed Protestantism as their religion, while 16.31% observed Ethiopian Orthodox Christianity, and 4.99% were Muslim.

Based on figures published by the Central Statistical Agency in 2005, this woreda has an estimated total population of 149,572, of whom 76,708 are men and 72,864 are women; 6,336 or 4.24% of its population are urban dwellers, which is less than the Zone average of 10.9%. With an estimated area of 1,273.75 square kilometers, Nole Kaba has an estimated population density of 117.4 people per square kilometer, which is greater than the Zone average of 91.7.

The 1994 national census reported a total population for this woreda of 107,786 in 20,355 households, of whom 52,790 were men and 54,996 were women; 3,547 or 3.29% of its population were urban dwellers. The two largest ethnic groups reported in Nole Kaba were the Oromo (97.82%), and the Amhara (1.75%); all other ethnic groups made up 0.43% of the population. Oromiffa was spoken as a first language by 99.28%. A plurality of the inhabitants observed Ethiopian Orthodox Christianity, with 10% reporting that as their religion, while 88.00% were Protestant, 2% Muslim.
