= Bambassi language =

Omotic language spoken in Ethiopia

Bambassi
- Mawes Aasse
- Native to: Ethiopia
- Region: in Benishangul-Gumuz Region, east of Asosa
- Native speakers: 2,300 (2011)
- Language family: Afro-Asiatic: Omotic; Mao; Bambassi

Language codes
- ISO 639-3: myf
- Glottolog: bamb1262
- ELP: Mao of Bambeshi

Bambassi (native name: Màwés Aasʼè) is an Omotic Afroasiatic language spoken in Ethiopia around the towns of Bambasi and Didessa in the area east of Asosa in Benishangul-Gumuz Region. The parent language group is the East Mao group. Alternative names for the language are Bambeshi, Siggoyo, Amam, Fadiro, Northern Mao, Didessa and Kere.

The most current information on the number of Bambassi speakers is not known, as the 2007 census grouped the Mao languages together, despite low lexical similarity. 33,683 mother tongue speakers of Maogna (covering Bambassi, Hozo and Seze) were listed.

== Similarities ==
Bambassi has a 31% lexical similarity with other Omotic languages.

== Phonology ==
Bambassi has 5 vowels: /a, e, i, o, u/. The vowels have lengthened forms, and Bambassi has contrastive vowel length.

Consonants
| | | Bilabial | Alveolar | Postalveolar | Velar | Glottal |
|---|---|---|---|---|---|---|
| Stop | voiceless | p | t | | k | |
| Stop | voiced | b | d | | g | |
| Stop | ejective | pʼ | tʼ | | kʼ | |
| Affricate | | | t͡sʼ | (t͡ʃ) | | |
| Fricative | voiceless | | s | ʃ | | h |
| Fricative | voiced | | z | | | |
| Nasal | | m | n | | ŋ | |
| Approximant | | | l | j | w | |
| Flap | | | ɾ | | | |

== Orthography ==
=== Vowels and tones ===
- a - [a]
- aa - [aː]
- e - [e]
- ee - [eː]
- i - [i]
- ii - [iː]
- o - [o]
- oo - [oː]
- u - [u]
- uu - [uː]
- á - high tone
- a - middle tone
- à - low tone

=== Consonants ===
- b - [b]
- c' - [t͡s']
- ch - [t͡ʃ]
- d - [d]
- g - [g]
- h - [h]
- k - [k]
- k' - [k']
- l - [l]
- m - [m]
- n - [n]
- ng - [ŋ]
- p - [p/f/ɸ]
- p' - [p']
- r - [ɾ]
- s - [s]
- sh - [ʃ]
- t - [t]
- t' - [t']
- w - [w]
- y - [j]
- z - [z]

== Morphology ==
This section gives information about different word types in the Bambassi language and how they relate to each other. It splits up in nouns, verbs, adjectives, adverbs, pronouns and numbers and will give information about tense, aspect and mood.

=== Nouns ===
Nouns in Northern Mao can be marked as singular, plural or dual. Dual and plural number are marked with specific suffixes, dual /-kuw/ and plural /-(w)ol/ (-> segmental morphology). In the singular number nouns have a zero morpheme. Nouns also usually agree with their quantifiers, e.g. numerals. In the citation form nouns, pronouns, demonstratives and verbal infinitives end with the vowel /-e/.

Example:

| Singular | Dual | Plural |
|---|---|---|
| es-ìʃ | es-kuw-iʃ | es-ol-iʃ |
| person-SBJ | person-DU-SBJ | person-PL-SBJ |
| a person | two people | people |

=== Adjectives ===
A separate word class of adjectives in Northern Mao hasn't yet been identified. The speakers use nominalizations, verbs or deverbal nouns to modify nouns. As in other African languages, the Bambassi language only has separate words for four basic colors which are expressed as verbs: black, white, red and blue. Other colors are expressed as metaphors and nominal constructions.

This is also the case to express dimension or value. We have verbs like 'be old', 'be small', 'be big', 'be good' and 'be bad'. They are always combined with a relative or associative construction.

Example:

tí-ŋ paːlt’-nà ha-nok-á

1SG-GEN girl-OBJ AFF-be.good-DECL

‘My girl (daughter) is good.’

=== Pronouns ===
Northern Mao knows personal, possessive and interrogative pronouns.

==== Personal pronouns ====
The following table shows an overview of the personal pronouns in Northern Mao each in the citation form with the terminal vowel /-e/, the subject, object case and genitive case.

| | Citation form | Subject Case | Object Case | Genitive Case |
|---|---|---|---|---|
| 1 SG | 1. tí-jé | tí-ʃ | tí-ná | tí-ŋ |
| 2 SG | 1. hì-jè | hì-ʃ | hì-nà | hì-ŋ |
| 3 SG | 1. íʃ-è | íʃ-ìʃ, í-té | íʃ-nà | íʃ-ìŋ |
| 1 DU | 1. han-é | han-íʃ | hán-ná | han-íŋ |
| 2 DU | 1. háw-é | háw-íʃ | háw-ná | háw-ìŋ |
| 3 DU | 1. íʃkuw-e | íʃkuw-iʃ | íʃkuw-na | íʃkuw-ìŋ |
| 1 PL | 1. hambèl-è | hambèl-ìʃ, ham-té | hambèl-là, ham-tá | hambèl-ìŋ |
| 2 PL | 1. hàwèl-è | hàwèl-ìʃ, hàw-té | hàwèl-là, hàw-tá | hàwèl-ìŋ |
| 3 PL | 1. íʃkol-è | íʃkol-ìʃ, íʃkol-té | íʃkol-là, íʃkol-tá | íʃkol-ìŋ |

==== Possessive pronouns ====
| Person | Singular | Dual | Plural |
|---|---|---|---|
| First | /tí/ | /han/ | /íʃ/ |
| Second | /hì/ | /háw/ | /íʃkuw/ |
| Third | /íʃ/ | /hàw/ | /íʃkol/ |

==== Interrogative pronouns ====
| | citation form with terminal vowel | subject case | object case | genitive case | comitative/instrumental |
|---|---|---|---|---|---|
| human | kí-jé 'who' | kí-ʃ 'who' | kí-ná 'whom' | kí-ŋ 'whose' | kí-ján 'with whom' |
| non-human | kó-jé 'what' | kó-ʃ 'what' | kó-ná 'what' | kó-ŋ 'what's' | kó-wán 'with what' |

=== Adverbs ===
Màwés Aasʼè has adverbs of time, manner and location. They can modify clauses or verbs. Some of them are listed in the following:

hóllá - 'now'

kwalla - 'yesterday'

háʦʼà - 'tomorrow'

wó - 'like this'

pàtʼwáne - 'again'

hòʃkján - 'only'

zèːpʼés - 'together'

ʃené - 'before'

bekʼà - 'end'

=== Postposition ===
Northern Mao knows two different types of postposition, the location/source and the instrument/comitative postposition. To express location or source you use the postposition /-et(a)/, for instrument or comitative the postposition /-an/.

Example:

(1) tí-ŋ ↓kjat’-èt háːl-↓á

1SG-GEN house-LOC sleep-DECL

‘S/he slept at my house.’

(2) bàmbàs-ét ha-tí-kí-↓á

Bambassi-SOURCE AFF-1SG-come-DECL

‘I came from Bambassi.’

(3) kús-án ha-mí-↓á

hand-INS AFF-eat-DECL

‘S/he ate by hand.’

(4) rám-àn sùk’-ná ha-tí-hów-j-↓á

Rama-COM store-OBJ AFF-1SG-go-AWAY-DECL

‘I went to the store with Rama.’

=== Verbs ===
[edit]

In the Bambassi language we find three oppositions affecting the structure of verb forms, namely the infinitive and the finite verb forms, the realis and irrealis forms and final and non-final forms.

Starting with the irrealis and realis verb forms, the following table summarizes the most important aspects:

| Realis | Irrealis |
|---|---|
| subject prefixes | subject suffixes |
| affirmative polarity | negative polarity, future tense |
| lots of aspectual distinctions | not many aspectual distinctions |
| nine aspectual categories | clear aspectual distinction only perfect combined with future tense |

The nine aspectual categories on realis verbs are: a perfect with /-ti/, a perfect with /-kòt'/, a past habitual with /-òw/, a non past-habitual formed by reduplication and auxiliary, a progressive present, a progressive past, a completive aspect, a durative and an iterative/continuative.

=== Numbers ===
Northern Mao number system is a 10-base-system. Numbers 11-19 are formed from parts of kú:sé "hand" and túget "foot".

| 1 | hiʃkì | 6 | kja:nsè |
| 2 | numbo | 7 | kúlùmbo |
| 3 | te:zè | 8 | kute:zé |
| 4 | meʦ'e | 9 | kúsméʦ'é |
| 5 | k'wíssí | 10 | kú:sú |

| 11 | kú:s-g-ét-iʃkì | 16 | kú:s-g-ét-kja:nsè |
| 12 | kú:s-g-ét-numbo | 17 | kú:s-g-ét-kúlùmbo |
| 13 | kú:s-g-ét-te:zè | 18 | kú:s-g-ét-kúre:zé |
| 14 | kú:s-g-ét-meʦ'e | 19 | kú:s-g-ét-kúsméʦ'è |
| 15 | kú:s-g-ét-k'wíssí | 20 | numbo-ku:se |

| 10 | kú:sú | 60 | kja:nsè-ku:se |
| 20 | numbo-ku:se | 70 | kúlùmbò-ku:se |
| 30 | te:zè-ku:se | 80 | kúre:zé-ku:se |
| 40 | meʦ'e-ku:se | 90 | kúsméʦ'è-ku:se |
| 50 | k'wíssí-ku:se | 100 | kú:s-ku:se |

200 numbo-ku:s-an kú:s-án

== Morphosyntaxe ==
=== Word order ===
The usual word order in the Bambassi language is subject - object - verb, the verb comes last. The following sentences are given as an example:

(1) íʃ es-ìʃ ʃóːʃ-ná ha-pí-↓á

DEF person-SBJ snake-OBJ AFF-kill-DECL

‘The person killed a snake.’

(2) múnts’-ìʃ p’iʃ-(na) ha-kaːm-á

woman-SBJ child-OBJ AFF-love-DECL

‘A woman loved a child.’
