= Darimu =

Woreda in Oromia, Ethiopia

Coordinates: 8°30′N 35°30′E

Darimu is one of the 180 woredas in the Oromia Region of Ethiopia. This woreda takes its name from the name of the region it lies in, "Darimu", which is mentioned in Alexander Bulatovich's book, From Entotto to the River Baro, published in 1897. Part of the Illubabor Zone, Darimu is bordered on the south by Metu, on the west and north by the Kelem Welega Zone, and on the east by Supena Sodo. The major town in Darimu is Dipa.

Coffee is an important cash crop of this woreda. Over 5,000 hectares is planted with this crop.

== Demographics ==
The 2007 national census reported a total population for this woreda of 145,070, of whom 72,348 were men and 72,722 were women; 4,245 or 2.93% of its population were urban dwellers. The majority of the inhabitants were Moslem, with 50.69% of the population reporting they observed this belief, while 35.61% of the population said they were Protestant, and 13.57% practised Ethiopian Orthodox Christianity.

Based on figures published by the Central Statistical Agency in 2005, this woreda has an estimated total population of 132,612, of whom 68,062 are men and 64,550 are women; 4,093 or 3.09% of its population are urban dwellers, which is less than the Zone average of 12%. With an estimated area of 1,395.79 square kilometers, Darimu has an estimated population density of 95 people per square kilometer, which is greater than the Zone average of 72.3.

The 1994 national census reported a total population for this woreda of 95,818 in 20,287 households, of whom 46,899 were men and 48,919 women; 2,290 or 2.39% of its population were urban dwellers at the time. The two largest ethnic groups reported in Darimu were the Oromo (97.36%), and the Amhara (2.38%); all other ethnic groups made up 0.26% of the population. Oromiffa was spoken as a first language by 98.47%, and 1.1% Amharic; the remaining 0.43% spoke all other primary languages reported. The plurality of the inhabitants were Muslim, with 44.64% of the population reporting they practiced that belief, while 29.82% of the population said they were Protestant, and 25.1% professed Ethiopian Orthodox Christianity.
