= Gimbi massacre =

2022 ethnic cleansing in Ethiopia

- Part of the Oromo conflict
- Gimbi massacre (Ethiopia)
- Location: 9.066269824024126°N 36.100787072783426°E; Tole, Gimbi, Oromia Region, Ethiopia
- Date: 18 June 2022
- Deaths: 450
- Victim: Amhara civilians
- Perpetrators: Oromo Liberation Army (denied by OLA)

On 18 June 2022, the Oromo Liberation Army (OLA) was accused of massacring over 400 Amhara civilians in the Gimbi county of Oromia Region, Ethiopia. Witnesses said that the OLA intentionally targeted ethnic Amhara people. This attack is part of a series of Amhara massacres that occurred in 2022.

A witness told the Associated Press he had counted at least 230 bodies and said he was "afraid this is the deadliest attack against civilians we have seen in our lifetime" and that mass graves were being dug for victims. One resident told reporters that the death toll surpassed 320, while Amnesty International reports that over 450 people were killed.

The government and the witnesses accused the Oromo Liberation Army (OLA) for carrying out the attack in Tole and surroundings, but the OLA denied that their troops were present, and put the blame on the government forces. The government and local security forces were accused by witnesses of not intervening during the five-hour long massacre.

== Background ==
In the 1990s, the TPLF, a predominantly Tigrayan militia, overthrew the Ethiopian government and held power until 2018, when ethnic Oromo Abiy Ahmed won the election. Tensions between the TPLF, now a political party in the Tigray region, and Ahmed's government grew until it reached a boiling point in late 2020 that began the Tigray War. Since then, both the Ethiopian government and TPLF have been accused of war crimes in the Tigray region, with spillovers in the Amhara Region and Oromia.

The TPLF went on an offensive in summer 2021, allying with the ethnocentrist Oromo Liberation Front against the Ethiopian government. This heavily increased the OLA's participation in the war, and the OLA has been accused of persecuting ethnic Amhara in the Oromia region.

== Massacre ==
Around June 17, residents said that security forces in Tole left the area without explanation. The attack began at around 9am on 18 June after many adults in the area had left home to work on farms or to attend the local mosque. Witnesses said that OLA fighters surrounded villages in the locality, before a gunshot signaled the start of the attack. The perpetrators predominantly used guns to kill their victims, but machetes and immolation were also used. 55 people were executed in the farms outside the village of Chefie, and two massacres took place in the village of Silsaw; 14 women and children were killed in a vacant home in the town, and over 48 people were killed in the town's mosque. Similarly, 13 Amhara were burned to death in the villages of Gutin Sefer and Silsaw. Many of the victims came from vulnerable populations such as women, children and the elderly. The oldest victim was 100 year old Aba Hajjii Hussein, while the youngest was 15 day old Nuredin Mohammed.

Looting also occurred in the aftermath of the massacre, with one witness stating "everything was damaged." Satellite imagery confirmed the burning of at least 5 villages and 480 civilian structures.

Witnesses told Human Rights Watch (HRW) that the perpetrators spoke Oromo and some had a distinctive hairstyle common among OLA fighters. They said the attackers wore a mix of civilian clothes and uniforms worn by the Oromia regional special forces and local militias as well as outdated Ethiopian National Defense Force (ENDF) uniforms. Government security forces arrived in the area after the perpetrators had left despite multiple calls for assistance. The massacre took place over the span of eight hours.

== Aftermath ==
As a result of the destruction of properties, the survivors of the massacre were forced to seek shelter in makeshift camps with little food. HRW reports nearly a month later that the survivors still lived in makeshift shelters, with limited access to humanitarian aid, living off whatever rations members of the Ethiopian Army shared with them.

In June 2022 Teddy Afro bashed Abiy Ahmed and his government in a critical new song (Na'et) shortly after the massacre. In his song he tries to vent the suppressed public anger and indignation, the swelling public resentment to the chaos and ethnic violence in the country.

The massacre provoked retaliatory raids by the Fano militia from the neighbouring Amhara Region. On August 2022, Oromo residents reported that Fano and the OLA clashed in the town of Agamsa, witnesses said they had seen 5 to 18 Amharas killed by the OLA, including a monk and a nun. After the OLA fled from the area, Fano militiamen accused the local Oromos of being behind the massacre and executed up to 100 unarmed Oromo civilians. Oromo residents report raids by Fano militiamen into the region being a “daily occurrence” with cattle being stolen and shepherds getting killed.

== Reaction ==
=== Foreign governments ===
==== US ====
The spokesperson for the US State Department, Ned Price, issued a statement on the victims of the attack and urged peaceful solutions and accountability on human rights. The Embassy of United States to FDRE reiterated the message which the State Department's spokesperson issued. The US Ambassador to the United Nations, Linda Thomas-Greenfield, also issued a separate messaging condemning the attacks on civilians and urging a peaceful solution. She said "We continue to call for all Ethiopians to choose peace, not violence. And we continue to call for comprehensive, inclusive justice for victims and accountability for those who have carried out human rights abuses and violations."

==== Iran ====
The Iranian Ministry of Foreign Affairs also condemned the attack calling it a "terrorist" attack by armed insurgent groups.

=== Ethiopia ===
The Prime Minister Abiy Ahmed condemned the attacks on innocent civilians calling it "unacceptable." Two days after the attack famous Ethiopian singer Teddy Afro released a song "Na'at" ("unleavened bread") which reflects "the dark time of Ethiopia". According to HRW, as of 31 August 2022 the government had failed to provide adequate shelter, food, medical care, and security for the affected communities. Residents said little had been done to investigate the massacre and bring perpetrators to justice.

=== United Nations ===
The Secretary-General of the United Nations António Guterres condemned the massacre stating, "The secretary-general condemns the reported killing of scores of civilians in Oromia this weekend," said Stephane Dujarric, chief spokesman for Guterres."

== See also ==
- Gawa Qanqa massacre
- Hachalu Hundessa riots
- Qelem Wollega massacre
