= A6 road (Ethiopia) =

Road in Ethiopia

A6 Road

Route information
- Maintained by Ethiopia National Highways Authority

Major junctions
- North end: Jimma
- South end: Mizan Teferi

Location
- Country: Ethiopia

Highway system
- Transport in Ethiopia

The A6 Road is a national route in Ethiopia. Traversing a course in an east–west direction, it runs for 219 kilometers. The cities of Jimma and Mizan Teferi are connected by this route.

== Route ==
The trunk A6 road starts off as the A5 continuation in southwestern city of Jimma and follows a path through the highlands. It ends up at Mizan Teferi; a small town located about one hundred kilometers away from South Sudan’s international boundary.

== History ==
It is suggested that the A6 trunk road was probably built for better road connection after World War II. In the past, under the Italian administration, the new road from Addis Ababa would end at Jimma. Later, it was renamed Route 7 and ran from Addis Ababa through Jimma and Mizan Teferi before reaching Metu. The road between Addis Ababa and Metu was renamed A5 in a new numbering system for roads that started around 2013. But A5 went another way westwards from Jimma; hence, the section of Route 7 running between Jimma and Mizan Teferi became A6 again.
