= Battle of Guté Dili =

- Part of the Mahdist War, Agar Maqnat
Date	14 October 1888
Location	Nejo, Ethiopia
Result	Shewan victory

Belligerents
(Ethiopian Empire) Shewa	Mahdist State

Commanders and leaders
Ras Gobana Dacche	Khalil al-Khuzani

The Battle of Guté Dili was fought on 14 October 1888 between an alliance of the Shewan forces of Ras Gobana Dacche and Mahdist forces under governor Khalil al-Khuzani near Nejo in the modern Mirab Welega Zone of the Oromia Region, Ethiopia. The Mahdist forces were routed, and only Khalil and Muhammad Hassan of Fadasi, who was leading the Bela Shangul contingent, with a small group of Ansar and Berta soldiers, were able to successfully flee the battlefield.

This engagement represents the high water mark of Mahdist activity in what is now southwestern Ethiopia. Despite raids over the next two years, local rulers west of Leqa Neqemte, such as 'Abd ar-Rahman Khojali of Qabesh, stopped paying tribute to Omdurman (the Mahdist capital) and ignored summons to present themselves there. Further, Ras Gobana's master, (then) king Menelik II of Shewa was able to continue extending his influence into the area south of the Abay River, which followed Menelik and Gobena's defeat of the Gojjame army six years earlier in the Battle of Embabo.
