= Viarengo =

Viarengo is a surname. Notable people with the surname include:

- Amulio Viarengo (born 1902), Italian racing cyclist
- Maria Abbebù Viarengo (born 1949), Ethiopian-born writer
- Martina Viarengo, Italian economist
