= Jimma Horo =

Jimma Horo may refer to the following:

- Jimma Horo, East Welega, former woreda (district) in East Welega Zone, Oromia Region, Ethiopia
- Jimma Horo, Kelem Welega, current woreda (district) in Kelem Welega Zone, Oromia Region, Ethiopia
