= Gebba River =

River in southwestern Ethiopia

Gebba River Geba, Gebe
- Gebba River (Ethiopia) Location of the Gebba River within Ethiopia

Location
- Country: Ethiopia

Physical characteristics
- Source
  - location: Acchiscio, Ethiopia
  - coordinates: 7°47′13″N 35°50′38″E
  - elevation: 2,267 m (7,438 ft)
- Mouth: Baro River
  - location: Seriti, Ethiopia
  - coordinates: 8°14′28″N 34°57′39″E
  - elevation: 557 m (1,827 ft)
- Length: 290 km (180 mi)
- Basin size: 4,740 km^{2} (1,830 sq mi)
- Discharge
  - location: Mouth (estimate)
  - average: 61.8 m^{3}/s (2,180 cu ft/s)
  - minimum: 7.87 m^{3}/s (278 cu ft/s)
  - maximum: 150.3 m^{3}/s (5,310 cu ft/s)

Basin features
- Progression: Baro → Sobat → White Nile → Nile → Mediterranean Sea
- River system: Nile
- Population: 336,000

The Gebba (or Geba) is a river of southwestern Ethiopia. It is a tributary of the Baro River, which is created at the confluence of the Gebba and the Birbir. The river is the planned site for the twin Gebba Hydro electric power dams.

== Gebba River Dam ==
The Gebba River Dam is to be constructed near the border of Jimma and Illubabur zones of Oromia State. The project agreement was signed on Monday September 8, 2014 as a joint venture between the Ethiopian Government, through the Ethiopian Electric Power Corporation (EEPCo), and the Chinese firms SINOHYDRO Corporation Limited and Gezhouba Group Company Limited (CGGC). Construction costs are estimated to be $583 million and take four and half years across two phases. 80% of financing will be through Exim Bank of China and the remaining 20% through the Ethiopian government. The dam will produce an estimated 391MW of electricity.

== See also ==
- List of rivers of Ethiopia
