= Anfillo (woreda) =

District in Oromia Region, Ethiopia

Coordinates: 8°30′N 34°40′E

Anfillo is a woreda in Oromia Region, Ethiopia. Part of the Kelem Welega Zone, Anfillo is bordered on the southwest by the Gambela Region, on the north by Jimma Gidami, on the northeast by Yemalogi Welele, and on the east by Sayo. The major town in Anfillo is Mugi.

Coffee is an important cash crop of this woreda. Over 50 square kilometers are planted with this crop.

== Demographics ==
The 2007 national census reported a total population for this woreda of 77,156, of whom 39,486 were men and 37,670 were women; 7,853 or 10.18% of its population were urban dwellers. The majority of the inhabitants were Protestants, with 63.74% reporting that as their religion, while 26.52% observed Ethiopian Orthodox Christianity, and 8.84% observed Islam.

Based on figures published by the Central Statistical Agency in 2005, this woreda has an estimated total population of 78,777, of whom 38,907 are men and 39,870 are women; 8,795 or 11.16% of its population are urban dwellers, which is greater than the Zone average of 10.9%. With an estimated area of 1,586.25 square kilometers, Anfillo has an estimated population density of 49.7 people per square kilometer, which is less than the Zone average of 91.7.

The 1994 national census reported a total population for this woreda of 55,847 in 10,254 households, of whom 28,312 were men and 27,535 were women; 4,908 or 8.79% of its population were urban dwellers. The three largest ethnic groups reported in Anfillo were the Oromo (89.66%), the Amhara (4.6%), and the Mao people (4.46%) otherwise known as the Anfillo; all other ethnic groups made up 1.28% of the population. Oromiffa was spoken as a first language by 95.41%, 2.92% Amharic, and 0.64% speak Mao one of the northern group of Omotic languages; the remaining 1.03% spoke all other primary languages reported. The majority of the inhabitants observed Ethiopian Orthodox Christianity, with 58.47% reporting that as their religion, while 31.4% were Protestant, and 9.7% Muslim.
