= Lalo Asabi =

District in Oromia, Ethiopia

Coordinates: 9°05′N 35°50′E

Lalo Asabi is one of the 180 districts in the Oromia of Ethiopia. Part of the West Welega Zone, Lalo Asabi is bordered on the south by Yubdo, on the west by Ayra Guliso, on the north by Boji, on the east by the Benishangul-Gumuz Region, and on the southeast by Gimbi. The administrative center of this woreda is Inango; other towns in Lalo Asabi include Dongoro.

== Overview ==
A survey of the land in Lalo Asabi shows that 80.39% is cultivated or arable, 5.26% pasture, 9.08% forest, and 5.26% infrastructure or other uses. Coffee is an important cash crop of this woreda. Over 50 square kilometers are planted with this crop.

There are 22 primary schools, and 2 secondary education schools in this woreda. Health services are provided by two clinics, and eight health posts; most of these facilities are located in urban areas.

== Demographics ==
At the 2007 national census, this woreda's population was 75,584 in 15,164 households, of whom 37,086 were men and 38,498 women; 10,370 or 13.71% of its population were urban dwellers. The majority of the inhabitants (85.83%) observed Protestantism, while 12.79% observed Ethiopian Orthodox Christianity, and 1.08% were Muslim.

Based on figures published by the Central Statistical Agency in 2005, this woreda has an estimated total population of 82,987, of whom 42,845 are men and 40,142 are women; 10,090 or 12.16% of its population are urban dwellers, which is greater than the Zone average of 10.9%. With an estimated area of 376.57 square kilometers, Lalo Asabi has an estimated population density of 220.4 people per square kilometer, which is greater than the Zone average of 91.7.

The 1994 national census reported a total population for this woreda of 58,695 in 9,526 households, of whom 28,473 were men and 30,222 were women; 5,647 or 9.62% of its population were urban dwellers. The two largest ethnic groups reported in Lalo Asabi were the Oromo (98.39%), and the Amhara (1.27%); all other ethnic groups made up 0.34% of the population. Oromiffa was spoken as a first language by 98.64%, and 1.09% spoke Amharic; the remaining 0.27% spoke all other primary languages reported. The majority of the inhabitants were Protestant, with 64.51% reporting that as their religion, while 32.84% practiced Ethiopian Orthodox Christianity, and 1.28% Muslim.
