= Homa (woreda) =

Administrative division of Ethiopia

Homa is one of the Aanaas in the Oromia Region of Ethiopia. It is part of the West Welega Zone. It was separated from Gimbi woreda. It is bounded by Haru in the east, Lalo Asabi in the west and Genji in the south. The administrative center for this woreda is Homa.

== Demographics ==
The 2007 national census reported this woreda's population as 24,557 in 4,878 households, of whom 12,134 were men and 12,423 women; 2,484 or 10.12% of its population were urban dwellers. The majority of the inhabitants observed Protestantism, with 77.17% reporting that as their religion, while 11.69% observed Ethiopian Orthodox Christianity and 9.7% were Muslim.
