= Ayra Guliso =

Coordinates: 9°00′N 35°30′E

Ayra Guliso was one of the 180 Aanaas in the Oromia Region of Ethiopia. It was separated for Ayra and Guliso woredas in November 1999. Part of the West Welega Zone, Ayra Guliso was bordered on the south by Dale Lalo, on the west by Gawo Dale, on the north by Jarso, on the northeast by Boji, and on the east by Lalo Asabi. The administrative center of this woreda was Guliso; other towns in Ayra Guliso included Ayra and Cheliya Yeka.

== Overview ==
Rivers in this woreda include the Bekel. A survey of the land in Ayra Guliso shows that 60.19% is cultivated or arable, 8% pasture, 14.37% forest, and 17.46% infrastructure or other uses. Coffee is an important cash crop for Ayra Guliso; over 50 square kilometers is planted with this crop.

There are 40 primary schools in this woreda and 4 secondary education schools. Health services are provided by one hospital, one health center, four clinics, and eight health posts; most of these facilities are located in urban areas.

== Demographics ==
Based on figures published by the Central Statistical Agency in 2005, this woreda has an estimated total population of 114,120, of whom 58,012 are men and 56,108 are women; 16,178 or 14.18% of its population are urban dwellers, which is greater than the Zone average of 10.9%. With an estimated area of 989.38 square kilometers, Ayra Guliso has an estimated population density of 115.3 people per square kilometer, which is greater than the Zone average of 91.7.

The 1994 national census reported a total population for this woreda of 80,321 in 12,410 households, of whom 39,542 were men and 40,779 were women; 9,043 or 11.26% of its population were urban dwellers. The largest ethnic group reported in Ayra Guliso was the Oromo (97.95%). Oromiffa was spoken as a first language by 98.09%, and 1.69% spoke Amharic; the remaining 0.22% spoke all other primary languages reported. The majority of the inhabitants were Protestant, with 78.81% reporting that as their religion, while 16.07% were Ethiopian Orthodox Christianity, and 3.9% Muslim.
