= Bure, Illubabor =

Town in Ethiopia

Bure is a town in south-western Ethiopia. Located in the Illubabor Zone of the Oromia Region, in the highlands north of the canyon of the Baro River, this town has a latitude and longitude of 8°17′N 35°6′E and an elevation of 1730 meters. It is one of two settlements in Bure woreda.

Explorer H.H. Austin spent two weeks convalescing at Bure from an illness he contracted after following the Baro river upstream from Sudan and climbing up the slopes of the canyon of the Baro.

According to Richard Pankhurst, Bure lay on the trade route between the Kingdom of Jimma and the Blue Nile, and had markets three days a week where a considerable trade was carried out in ivory, civet, wax, honey, coffee, raw cotton, shemmas, tef, and various grains. Its importance increased in the 1920s and 1930s. By 1918, Bure was equipped with a telegraph station.

== Demographics ==
Based on figures from the Central Statistical Agency in 2007, Bure has an estimated total population of 5475 of whom 2705 are men and 2770 are women.
