= Bicho =

Bicho may refer to:

- Bicho (album), by Caetano Veloso, 1977
- Bicho (food), the common Tagalog name for youtiao, a type of fried dough
- Bicho (woreda), Oromia, Ethiopia
- Bicho (footballer, born 1992), Spanish footballer (Xerez)
- Bicho (footballer, born 1996), Spanish footballer (Deportivo La Coruña, Compostela)
- Bicho (footballer, born 2003), Spanish women's footballer (Atlético Madrid)
