= Kondala =

Administrative division of Ethiopia

Kondala is one of the Aanaas in the Oromia Region of Ethiopia. It is part of the West Welega Zone. It was established in December 2005 after being separated from the Begi woreda. It is bounded by Benishangul-Gumuz Region and Mana Sibu in the north, Kelem Welega Zone in the south and southeast, Begi in the west and Babo Gambel in northeast. Gaba Dafino is the administrative center.

== Demographics ==
The 2007 national census reported this woreda's population as 96,253 in 18,286 households, of whom 48,612 were men and 47,641 women; 3,117 or 3.24% of its population were urban dwellers. The majority of the inhabitants (85.39%) observed Islam, while 7.92% observed Ethiopian Orthodox Christianity, and 6.61% were Protestants.
