= Gambela =

Gambela or Gambella may refer to:

== Places ==
- Gambela Region, Ethiopia
- Gambela, Ethiopia, a city and separate woreda in Gambela Region
- Gambela Zuria, Greater Gambela, a woreda surrounding the city of Gambela
- Gambela National Park
- Apostolic Vicariate of Gambella

== People ==
- Ittocorre Gambella (fl. 1127–1140), regent of the Giudicato of Logudoro
- Marta Gambella (born 1974), Italian Olympic softball player

== See also ==
- Babo Gambela, a woreda of the Oromia Region, Ethiopia
