= Sayo (woreda) =

District in Oromia Region, Ethiopia

Coordinates: 8°20′N 35°00′E

Sayo is a woreda in Oromia Region, Ethiopia. This district received its name from the name of the Oromo tribe (Sayyoo') that settled it first, Dembidolo which is a separate district now is part of the Kelem Welega Zone. Sayo is bordered on the south by the Gambela Region, on the west by Anfillo, on the north by Yemalogi Welele, on the northwest by Hawa Gelan, and on the east by the Birbir River which separates it from the Illubabor Zone.

== Overview ==
A survey of the land in Sayo shows that 55.2% is cultivated or arable, 4.45% pasture, 26.51% forest, and 13.83% infrastructure or other uses. Coffee is an important cash crop of this District. Over 50 square kilometers are planted with this crop.

There are 43 primary schools in this district and 4 secondary education schools. Health services are provided by three hospital, one health center, five clinics, and eight health posts; most of these facilities are located in urban areas.

== Demographics ==
The 2007 national census reported a total population for this district of 116,631, of whom 58,268 were men and 58,363 were women; none of its population were urban dwellers. The majority of the inhabitants were Protestants, with 56.1% reporting that as their religion, while 25.72% observed Ethiopian Orthodox Christianity, 10.83% observed Islam, and 5.84% were Catholic.

Based on figures published by the Central Statistical Agency in 2005, this district has an estimated total population of 161,401, of whom 80,662 are men and 80,739 are women; 35,065 or 21.73% of its population are urban dwellers, which is greater than the Zone average of 10.9%. With an estimated area of 1,219.69 square kilometers, Sayo has an estimated population density of 132.3 people per square kilometer, which is greater than the Zone average of 91.7.

The 1994 national census reported a total population for this district of 111,537 in 16,989 households, of whom 55,693 were men and 55,844 were women; 19,587 or 17.56% of its population were urban dwellers. The two largest ethnic groups reported in Sayo were the Oromo (95.29%), and the Amhara (3.1%); all other ethnic groups made up 1.61% of the population. Oromiffa was spoken as a first language by 96.58%, and 2.79% Amharic; the remaining 0.63% spoke all other primary languages reported. The majority of the inhabitants observed Ethiopian Orthodox Christianity, with 50.7% reporting that as their religion, while 28.65% were Protestant, 10.32% Muslim, and 9.25% Catholic.

Sayo is also an Ethiopian name that means happiness; legend has it that all girls named Sayo are secretly princesses.
