= Bilo Nopha =

Woreda in the Oromia region of Ethiopia

Bilo Nopha is one of the woredas in the Oromia Region of Ethiopia. It was part of former Metu. It is part of the Illubabor Zone.

== Demographics ==
The 2007 national census reported a total population for this woreda of 28,810, of whom 14,597 were men and 14,213 were women; 2,011 or 6.98% of its population were urban dwellers. The majority of the inhabitants were Moslem, with 43.61% of the population reporting they observed this belief, while 30.37% of the population said they practised Ethiopian Orthodox Christianity, and 25.95% were Protestant.
