= Sayo Nole =

Ethiopian district

Sayo Nole is a Aanaas in the Oromia Region of Ethiopia. It used to be part of the Nole Kaba woreda. It is part of the West Welega Zone.

== Demographics ==
The 2007 national census reported a total population for this woreda of 76,013, of whom 37,563 were men and 38,450 were women; 2,332 or 3.07% of its population were urban dwellers. The majority of the inhabitants (74.76%) observed Protestantism as their religion, while 12.74% were Muslim, and 12.08% observed Ethiopian Orthodox Christianity.
