= Huka Halu =

Woreda in the Oromia region of Ethiopia

Huka Halu is one of the woredas in the Oromia Region of Ethiopia. It was part of Bure. It is part of the Illubabor Zone.

== Demographics ==
The 2007 national census reported a total population for this woreda of 16,881, of whom 8,481 were men and 8,400 were women; 1,685 or 9.98% of its population were urban dwellers. The majority of the inhabitants said they practised Ethiopian Orthodox Christianity, with 65% of the population reporting they observed this belief, while 23.52% were Protestant, and 11.04% of the population were Moslem.
