= Nejo (woreda) =

District in Oromia Region, Ethiopia

Coordinates: 9°25′N 35°40′E

Nejo is a woreda in Oromia Region, Ethiopia. Part of the West Welega Zone, Nejo is bordered on the southeast by Boji, on the west by Jarso, on the northwest by Mana Sibu, and on the north and east by the Benishangul-Gumuz Region. The administrative center is Nejo; other towns in Nejo include Gori and Wara Jiru.

== Overview ==
This woreda is the location of a goldmine said to be the oldest in the world, according to the Spectrum Guide to Ethiopia; that book adds that it is "thought by some to be the source of the legendary 'King Solomon's Mines' featured in the novel of the same name by Rider Haggard." European prospectors, granted concessions by the Ethiopian government, searched for gold between 1901 until the Second Italian-Abyssinian War, finding deposits on Tulu Kami and the Laga Gumbi hills, as well as along the Alaltu and Dilla Rivers. Coffee is an important cash crop of Nejo. Over 50 square kilometers is planted with this crop.

In the 2005 Ethiopian elections, the electoral district of Nejo elected Mesfin Nemera Deriesa (party whip of the Oromo Federalist Democratic Movement) as their representative in the House of Peoples' Representatives.

== Demographics ==
The 2007 national census reported a total population for this woreda of 130,909 in 25,336 households, of whom 64,654 were men and 66,255 were women; 24,505 or 18.72% of its population were urban dwellers. The majority of the inhabitants (63.72%) observed Protestantism, while 33.69% observed Ethiopian Orthodox Christianity, and 1.72% were Muslim.

Based on figures published by the Central Statistical Agency in 2005, this woreda has an estimated total population of 148,891, of whom 75,785 are men and 73,106 are women; 25,927 or 17.41% of its population are urban dwellers, which is greater than the Zone average of 10.9%. With an estimated area of 984.07 square kilometers, Nejo has an estimated population density of 151.3 people per square kilometer, which is greater than the Zone average of 91.7.

The 1994 national census reported a total population for this woreda of 103,993 in 51,115 households, of whom 65,660 were men and 52,878 were women; 14,503 or 13.95% of its population were urban dwellers. The largest ethnic group reported in Nejo was the Oromo (98.94%). Oromiffa was spoken as a first language by 99.32%. The majority of the inhabitants observed Ethiopian Orthodox Christianity, with 55.84% reporting that as their religion, while 42.26% were Protestant, and 1.68% Muslim.
