= Bicho (woreda) =

Ethiopian governmental organisation

Bicho is one of the woredas in the Oromia Region of Ethiopia. Part of the former Metu, it is now part of the Illubabor Zone.

== Demographics ==
The 2007 national census reported a total population for this woreda of 24,947, of whom 12,512 were men and 12,435 were women; 1,555 or 6.25% of its population were urban dwellers. The majority of the inhabitants were Moslem, with 72.68% of the population reporting they observed this belief, while 19.1% of the population said they practised Ethiopian Orthodox Christianity, and 8.1% were Protestant.
