= Boji =

Coordinates: 9°15′N 35°45′E

Bodji was one of the 180 Aanaas in the Oromia Region of Ethiopia. It is divided between Bodji Choqorsa and Bodji Dirmaji. Part of the West Welega Zonee, Bodji was bordered on the southwest by Ayra Guliso, on the west by Jarso, on the northwest by Nejo, on the northeast by the Benishangul-Gumuz Region, and on the southeast by Lalo Asabi. Towns in Bodji included Bila and Muklami.

Coffee is an important cash crop in Bodji. Over 50 square kilometers are planted with this crop.

== Demographics ==
Based on figures published by the Central Statistical Agency in 2005, this woreda has an estimated total population of 115,043, of whom 59,320 are men and 55,723 are women; 9,122 or 7.93% of its population are urban dwellers, which is less than the Zone average of 10.9%. With an estimated area of 966.1 square kilometers, Bodji has an estimated population density of 119.1 people per square kilometer, which is greater than the Zone average of 91.7.

The 1995 national census reported a total population of 82,184 in 13,521 households, of whom 39,968 were men and 42,216 were women; 5,104 or 6.21% of its population were urban dwellers. The largest ethnic group reported in Bodji was the Oromo (99.12%). Oromo was spoken as a first language by 99.38%. The majority of the inhabitants were Protestant with 85.31% reporting that as their religion, while 14% observed Ethiopian Orthodox Christianity.
