= Dembidolo =

Town in Oromia Region, Ethiopia

Dembi Dollo Dambidolloo (Oromo)
- Town
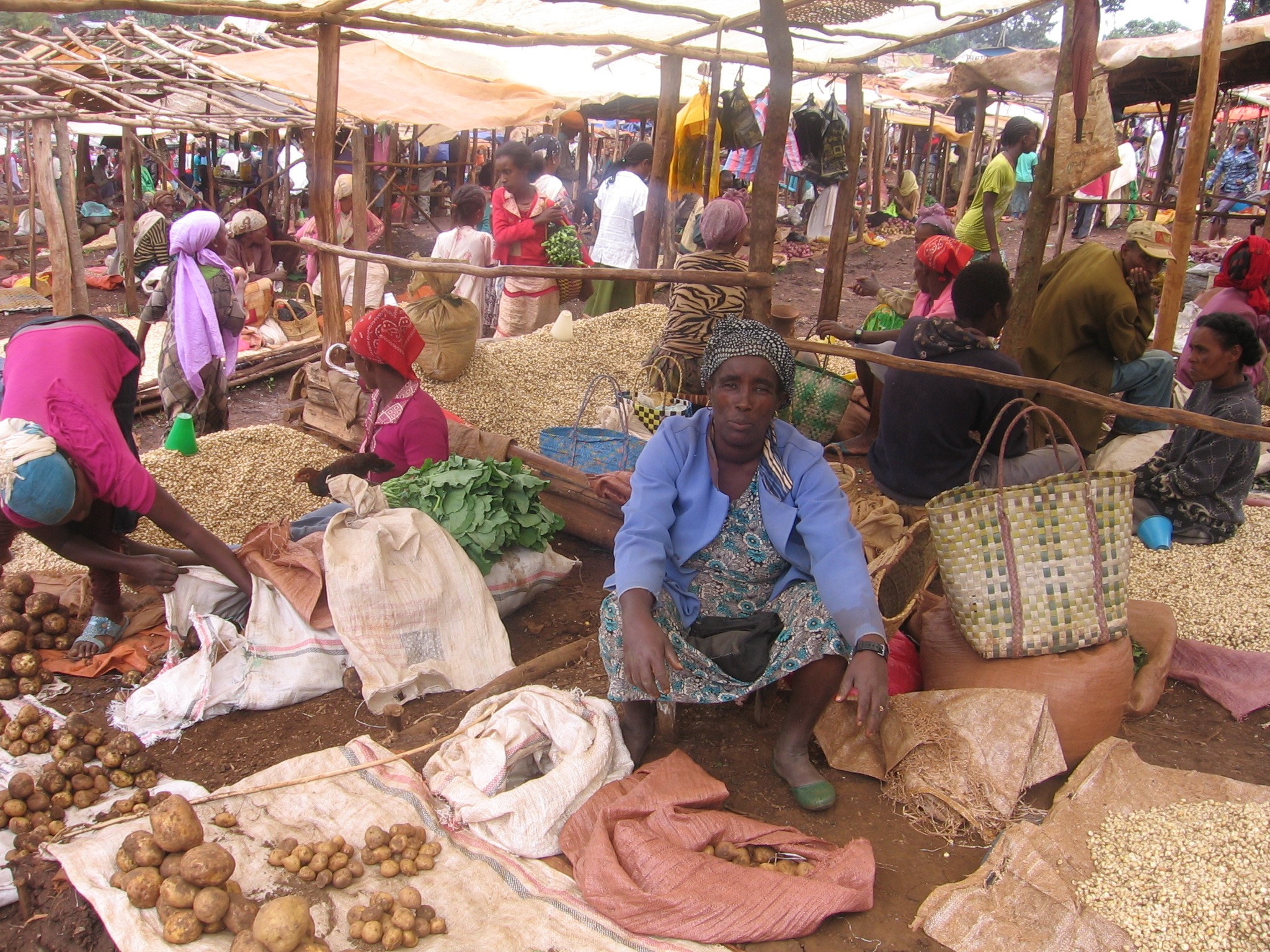
- Market of Dembi Dollo

- Location within Ethiopia
- Coordinates: 08°32′07″N 34°48′01″E
- Country: Ethiopia
- Region: Oromia
- Zone: Kelam Welega
- Elevation: 1,701 m (5,581 ft)

Population (2007)
  - Total: 29,448
- Time zone: UTC+3 (EAT)

Dembidollo (Oromo: Dambi Doolloo), also spelled Dembi Dolo, is a market town and separate woreda in south-western Ethiopia. It is the capital of Kelam Welega Zone of the Oromia Region. This town, which is at an elevation of between 1,701 m (5,581 ft) and 1,827 m (5,994 ft) above sea level, was originally known as Sayo.

Dembidollo is known for goldsmith work and for tej production. The town is served by Dembidollo Airport (ICAO code HADD, IATA DEM).

== History ==
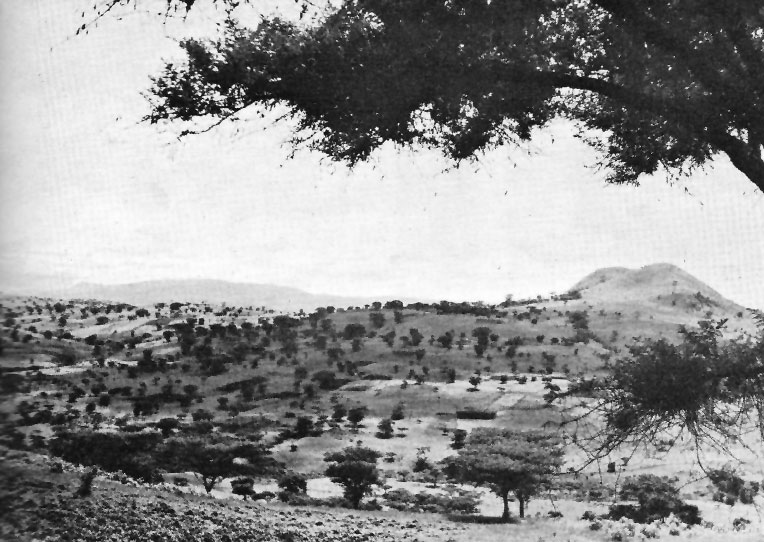
Saïo heights, circa 1942

Originally known as Sayo, after the semi-autonomous kingdom that had ruled in this area in the years after 1900, by 1920 this town served as the seat of the governors of this part of south-western Ethiopia until the Italian conquest. During this period Dembidolo was "a great commercial centre for coffee, where by the 1930s perhaps 500,000 kilos of beans, besides large quantities of wax and skins, were exported every year to the Sudan." Emperor Iyasu V visited Dembidolo around 1912, and was welcomed by Dejazmach Jote.

By 1958 Dembi Dollo became one of 27 places in Ethiopia ranked as First Class Township. That same year, the Commercial Bank of Ethiopia opened a branch in the town.

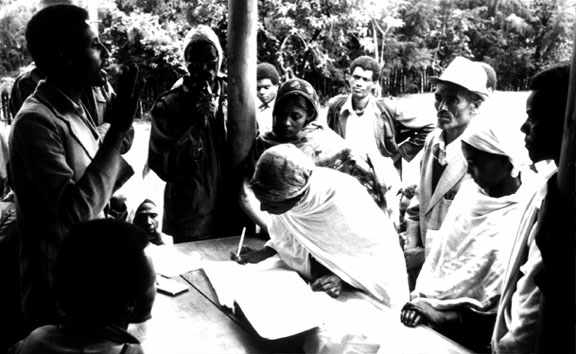
Election in Dembi Dolo, June 1992

The last military action of the Oromo Liberation Front (OLF) before the demise of the Derg in 1991 occurred at Dembi Dollo, when some of its units reportedly killed more than 700 government soldiers. Afterwards, the OLF assumed civilian control of Dembi Dollo and its surrounding territory. However, when the OLF found that their efforts to field candidates in the rest of the Oromia region were frustrated by the Oromo Peoples' Democratic Organization the OLF withdrew from the government in 1992. This proved to be a disaster for the OLF, as EPRDF forces captured Dembi Dollo and forcibly drove the OLF membership into exile.

A modern water supply system was expected to be completed in the town by October 2017.

== Demographics ==
Sentinel-2 satellite image of western Ethiopia, including Gambela, Goba and Dembidolo

The 2007 national census reported a total population for this town of 29,448, of whom 15,144 were men and 14,304 were women. The majority of the inhabitants were Protestants, with 58.23% reporting that as their religion, while 30.14% observed Ethiopian Orthodox Christianity, 8.81% observed Islam, and 2.07% were Catholic.

The 1994 census reported this town had a total population of 19,587 of whom 9,832 were males and 9,755 were females. It is the largest settlement in Sayo woreda.

== Climate ==
Climate data for Dembidolo, elevation 1,850 m (6,070 ft), (1971–2000)
Month	Jan	Feb	Mar	Apr	May	Jun	Jul	Aug	Sep	Oct	Nov	Dec	Year
Mean daily maximum °C (°F)	27.7 (81.9)	29.0 (84.2)	29.3 (84.7)	28.5 (83.3)	26.0 (78.8)	24.3 (75.7)	23.5 (74.3)	24.0 (75.2)	25.9 (78.6)	26.3 (79.3)	26.6 (79.9)	26.6 (79.9)	26.5 (79.6)
Mean daily minimum °C (°F)	14.6 (58.3)	15.3 (59.5)	16.1 (61.0)	16.1 (61.0)	15.5 (59.9)	14.7 (58.5)	14.4 (57.9)	14.4 (57.9)	14.6 (58.3)	14.5 (58.1)	14.6 (58.3)	14.9 (58.8)	15.0 (59.0)
Average precipitation mm (inches)	7.0 (0.28)	28.0 (1.10)	70.0 (2.76)	129.0 (5.08)	197.0 (7.76)	170.0 (6.69)	165.0 (6.50)	120.0 (4.72)	163.0 (6.42)	96.0 (3.78)	31.0 (1.22)	19.0 (0.75)	1,195 (47.06)
Average relative humidity (%)	58	57	60	66	78	82	83	84	78	75	69	63	71
Source: FAO

== Notable people ==
- Ebbisa Adunya (c. 1970 - 1996) – musician, political activist, OLF leader

== See also ==
- Siege of Saïo
