= Begi, Oromia =

District in Oromia Region, Ethiopia

Coordinates: 9°15′N 34°45′E

Begi is a woreda in Oromia Region, Ethiopia. Part of the West Welega Zone, Begi is bordered on the south by Kelem Welega Zone, on the west and north by the Benishangul-Gumuz Region, on the northeast by Mana Sibu, and on the east by Jarso. Towns in Begi include Begi, Kober, and Segno Gebeya. Kondala woreda was part of Begi woreda.

Coffee is an important cash crop of this woreda; over 50 square kilometers are planted with this crop.

== Demographics ==
The 2007 national census reported this woreda's population at 119,722 in 22,508 households, of whom 59,374 were men and 60,348 women; 7,895 or 6.59% of its population were urban dwellers. The majority of the inhabitants (75.65%) was Muslim, while 14.93% were Ethiopian Orthodox Christianity, and 9.3% Protestant.

Based on figures published by the Central Statistical Agency in 2005, this woreda has an estimated total population of 191,790, of whom 97,154 are men and 94,636 are women; 11,672 or 6.09% of its population are urban dwellers, which is less than the Zone average of 10.9%. With an estimated area of 2,522.50 square kilometers, Begi has an estimated population density of 76 people per square kilometer, which is less than the Zone average of 91.7.

The 1994 national census reported a total population for this woreda of 137,614 in 25,738 households, of whom 68,204 were men and 69,410 were women; 6,526 or 4.74% of its population were urban dwellers. The three largest ethnic groups reported in Begi were the Oromo (91.91%), the Mao (6.42%), and the Berta (0.93%); all other ethnic groups made up 0.74% of the population. Oromiffa was spoken as a first language by 93%, 6.27% Mao, and 0.4% Berta; the remaining 0.33% spoke all other primary languages reported. The majority of the inhabitants observed Muslim, with 77.03% reporting that as their religion, while 17.48% were Ethiopian Orthodox Christianity, and 5.31% Protestant.
