= Ebbisa Adunya =

Oromo musician, poet, and political activist (c. 1970 – 1996)

Background information
- Born: c. 1970; Dembi Dollo, Western Oromia, Ethiopia
- Died: 30 August 1996 Addis Ababa, Ethiopia
- Genres: Traditional Oromo music Resistance music
- Occupations: Musician, poet, political activist
- Instruments: Vocals, traditional instruments
- Years active: c. 1990s

Ebbisa Adunya (c. 1970 – August 30, 1996), also spelled Eebbisaa Addunyaa, was an Oromo musician, poet, and political activist from Ethiopia.

== Life ==
Ebbisa was born in Dembi Dollo, Oromia around 1970. He had two brothers and three sisters, and was the eldest son in his family. He attended Oliiqaa Dingil Primary School, Qellem High School, and then passed the national examination for higher education to attend a university.

In 1991, while Ebbisa waiting for admission to a university, the military regime of Ethiopia was overthrown by OLF, TPLF, and EPLF forces. The OLF (Oromian Liberation Front) set up a military base in Dembi Dollo, Ebbisa’s hometown. Ebbisa supported self-determination for the Oromo people, and, concerned about the deteriorating conditions of Oromia, joined the OLF. He was trained to be a cadre and became a cadre trainer in the Dembi Dollo OLF military camp. Ebbisa also joined the OLF music band, determined to keep Oromo culture, music, and identity alive.

Ebbisa became a cultural figure for the Oromo people. His music, deeply rooted in Oromo traditions, played a crucial role in promoting Oromo culture and identity, especially during a period when such expressions were suppressed by the Ethiopian government. His songs often reflected his political commitment, addressing themes of resistance and hope for the Oromo community.

== Death ==
On August 30, 1996, Ebbisa and his friend Tana Wayessa were shot dead by government gunmen of the Zenawi regime at Ebbisa's home in the Shiromeda area of Addis Ababa. Ethiopian authorities initially claimed Ebbisa died by suicide, a narrative that was widely dismissed by his supporters and human rights groups. The BBC has documented inconsistencies in the official account of his death, suggesting that it was an extrajudicial killing linked to his activism.

Eyewitnesses reported that the bodies were taken away by individuals in a vehicle with government license plates. The incident was documented by the Oromia Support Group, a UK-based human rights organization, and is considered a significant event in the persecution of Oromo activists during that time.

== Legacy ==
Ebbisa Adunya’s legacy continues through his music, which remains a source of inspiration for the Oromo community.
