= Mao languages =

Omotic languages spoken in Ethiopia and Sudan

Mao
- Blue Nile Mao
- Geographic distribution: Ethiopia, Sudan
- Linguistic classification: Afro-Asiatic: Omotic; North; Mao

Language codes
- Glottolog: maoo1243

Most of the Mao languages belong to the Omotic languages within the Afro-Asiatic language family. Highland Gwama is the only Koman language belonging to the Nilo-Saharan family whose speakers call themselves Mao. Speakers of the other related Koman languages of the area, Lowland Gwama and Komo (as well as Uduk and Opo) do not self-identify as Mao.

The Omotic Mao languages which are spoken in Ethiopia and parts of Sudan can be classified as follows:

- Bambasi, spoken in the Bambasi woreda of Benishangul-Gumuz Region,
- Hozo, spoken along the Dabus River in the Mirab (West) Welega Zone and Kelam Welega Zone in Oromia Region
- Seze, spoken around Begi and Kondala in the Mirab (West) Welega Zone in Oromia Region.
- Ganza, spoken south of Bambasi in the Asosa Zone of Benishangul-Gumuz Region, west of the Hozo and Seze languages and in Blue Nile State in Sudan.

The Anfillo language (Southern Mao) does not belong to this group but is classified as an Omotic Gonga language.

Map of the Mao and Komo languages in Western Ethiopia

The estimated number of speakers varies among these languages: approximately 5,000 speakers of Bambasi, 6,000 speakers of Hozo, 10,000 speakers of Seze and a few hundred Ganza speakers (Bender, 2000; Küspert, 2015, Küspert 2026, The Ethnologue). In recent times, a few thousand Bambasi speakers have settled in the valley of the Didessa River and Belo Jegonfoy Woreda. Much of the Mirab Welega Zone was historically inhabited by speakers of Mao languages. However, these languages have experienced a decline in the number of speakers amid the growing influence of Oromo.

== Endangerment ==
In general, all Mao (and Komo) languages in western Ethiopia are at risk, although the situation in Benishangul Gumuz and Oromia is different as the Oromia Regional State does not recognise any language other than Oromo whereas in Benishangul Gumuz Regional State, five languages a recognised.

According to The Ethnologue 2025, the languages are classified as follows:

Hozo: 7 – shifting; Seze: 7 – shifting; Gwama 6b - threatened; Komo: 6a - vigorous; Ganza 6a - vigorous; Northern Mao: 5 - developing.

Interviews with Hozo and Seze speakers suggest that educational settings strongly encourage the use of Oromo, which has consequently become a preferred choice of public communication. The impact of Christian missions is complex. Participation in local churches is often associated with social pressure toward cultural and linguistic assimilation. Recently, the situation seems to be changing slightly, as well-educated (Muslim) speakers appear to have developed a growing awareness of their linguistic and cultural heritage. Whether these efforts will be sufficient to halt the impending disappearance of the Mao languages remains to be seen. The dissertation of Ahland 2012 makes Northern Mao arguably the best-researched Mao language. Itis now taught as a subject in some pilot schools near Bambasi town. However, it is used only by a small group of around 3,000 speakers and, hence, the status as “developing” in The Ethnologue seems optimistic. The situation between the Koman variants Highland Gwama (where speakers self-identify as ‘Mao’) and Lowland Gwama (‘non-Mao’) is likely to be different, as Lowland Gwama is recognised as a language of instruction in some schools in Benishangul Gumuz Regional State.

== Contact ==
Mao languages are in close and long-standing contact with Koman languages, and linguistic affiliation does not always coincide with ethnic identity. Some Koman-speaking groups in western Ethiopia, like the Kwama, are known as Mao, or vice versa, as in the case of the Ganza (also known as Koma).

Intensified contact between Mao, Koman, and Kefoid languages dates to the formation of the Gonga kingdom of Anfillo in the late sixteenth century, following the westward migration of Kefoid-speaking elites during the Oromo expansions into the Gibe basin around 1560–1570. The establishment of Anfillo brought the local population into sustained and asymmetric contact with Kefoid languages as well as with neighboring Koman languages, whose speakers inhabited the surrounding lowlands.

Within the Gonga political system, Mao speakers formed a subordinate social category, which promoted widespread bilingualism and language shift toward dominant languages. Mao communities were integrated as serfs or dependent clients of Gonga elites, creating daily interaction in labor, ritual, and military contexts, conditions known to facilitate lexical borrowing and structural influence. In parallel, other Mao groups remained mobile at the margins of Gonga territories, maintaining master-client relations with agricultural populations through the exchange of forest products, a setting that likewise favored multilingual repertoires.

The designation Mao historically served as a sociopolitical label applied to diverse subordinate populations (also known as Nao, Mawo, Manno, or Manjo) rather than a single linguistic entity. This history has contributed to the present-day linguistic diversity and fragmentation of the Mao languages, and it is associated with extensive contact-induced restructuring resulting from prolonged interaction with Koman, Kefoid, and, later, Oromo languages.

== Numerals ==
Comparison of numerals in Mao languages:

Language	1	2	3	4	5	6	7	8	9	10
Hozo (Akʼmo wàandi)	ónnó	dòmbò	shiazi	betsʼí	kʼítsí	kʼítsí òttá ónnó (5 + 1)	kʼítsí òttá dòmbò (5 + 2)	kʼítsí òttá shiazi (5 + 3)	kʼítsí òttá betsʼí (5 + 4)	bawundí
Seze (Seezi wàani)	ìshile	nòmbè	sììzé	bessʼé	kʼwisse	kʼwisse òòt ìshile (5 + 1)	kʼwísse òòt nòmbè (5 + 2)	kʼwísse òòt sììzé (5 + 3)	kʼwísse òòt bessʼé (5 + 4)	kúusé
Northern Mao (Bambasi Mao)	hishkì	numbo	teezè	mesʼe	kʼwíssí	kyaansè	kúlùmbò (litː hand-two ?)	kúteezé (litː hand-three ?)	kúsmésʼe (litː hand-four ?)	kúúsú
Ganza (Gàmi Nána)	ʔíʃkúwéén	mámbùʔ	tíízìʔ	más’s’ìʔ	k’wíssíʔ	ʔíʃkípín	mámpín	wóp’ò	ʃéléʔ	kónsóbààʔ

== See also ==
- Mao word lists (Wiktionary)
