= Gimbi (woreda) =

District in Oromia Region, Ethiopia

Coordinates: 9°00′N 36°00′E

Gimbi is a woreda in Oromia Region, Ethiopia. Part of the West Welega Zone, Gimbi woreda is bordered on the south by Haru, on the southwest by Yubdo, on the west by Lalo Asabi, on the north by the Benishangul-Gumuz Region, on the east by the East Welega Zone, and on the southeast by an exclave of the Benishangul-Gumuz Region. The administrative center for this woreda is Gimbi. Homa woreda was part of Gimbi woreda.

Coffee is an important cash crop of this woreda. Over 5,000 hectares are planted with this crop. Iron and phosphate deposits are located in the neighborhood of Bikilal, a village 18 to 20 kilometers north of Gimbi, but have not yet been commercially developed.

== Demographics ==
The 2007 national census reported this woreda's population at 74,623 in 14,925 households, of whom 36,708 were men and 37,915 women; none of its population were urban dwellers. The majority of the inhabitants observed Protestantism, with 65.37% reporting that as their religion, while 28.76% observed Ethiopian Orthodox Christianity, and 4.12% were Muslim.

Based on figures published by the Central Statistical Agency of Ethiopia in 2005, this woreda has an estimated total population of 147,701, of whom 75,078 are men and 72,623 are women; 40,162 or 27.19% of its population are urban dwellers, which is greater than the Zone average of 10.9%. With an estimated area of 1,183.44 square kilometers, Gimbi has an estimated population density of 124.8 people per square kilometer, which is greater than the Zone average of 91.7.

The 1994 national census reported a total population for this woreda of 100,705 in 14,532 households, of whom 49,312 were men and 51,393 were women; 22,448 or 22.29% of its population were urban dwellers. The two largest ethnic groups reported in Gimbi were the Oromo (95.3%) and the Amhara (2.49%); all other ethnic groups made up 2.21% of the population. Afaan Oromoo, also known as Oromiffa, is spoken as a first language by 97.35%, and 2.08% speak Amharic; the remaining 0.57% speak all other primary languages reported. The majority of the inhabitants observed Ethiopian Orthodox Christianity, with 51.83% reporting that as their religion, while 40.18% were Protestant, 4.79% were Muslim, and 1.76% Catholic.
