= Kiltu Kara (woreda) =

Administrative division of Ethiopia

Kiltu Kara is one of the Aanaas in the Oromia of Ethiopia. It is part of the West Welega Zone. It was formed after session of Mana Sibu woreda in 1999. It is bounded by Nejo in the east, Mana Sibu in west and Babo Gambel in south. Generally the district has a total area of 714.9 Km2. Kiltu Kara is the administrative center.

== Demographics ==
The 2007 national census reported a total population for this woreda of 51,800 in 9,289 households, of whom 25,893 were men and 25,907 women; 5,256 or 1.02% of its population were urban dwellers. The majority of the inhabitants (52.26%) observed Protestantism, while 42.97% observed Ethiopian Orthodox Christianity, and 4.55% were Muslim.
