= Alwero Dam =

Dam in Gambela Region, Ethiopia

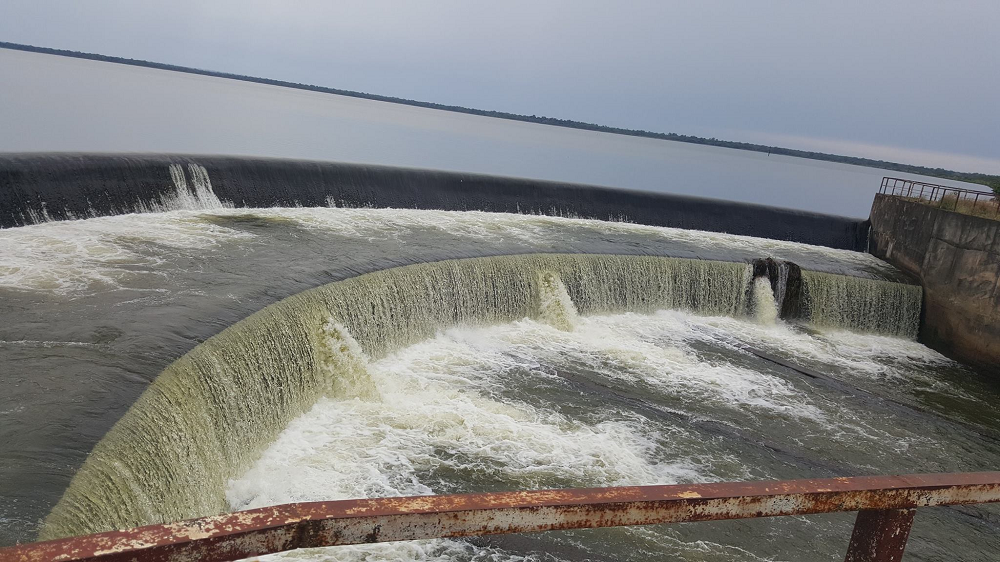

- Location within Ethiopia
- Interactive map of Alwero Dam
- Country: Ethiopia
- Location: Gambela Region
- Coordinates: 7.8476356°N 34.4824508°E
- Purpose: Irrigation
- Status: Operational
- Construction began: 1984

Dam and spillways
- Impounds: Alwero River

The Alwero Dam, also known as the Abobo Dam, is a reservoir and irrigation system in the Abobo district of Gambela Region, in western Ethiopia. It was built in 1985 with Soviet Union aid, as part of a strategy by the Derg regime led by former Ethiopian President Mengistu Haile Mariam (Wara-Ariet) to increase resource spending on irrigation following the 1983–1985 famine in Ethiopia. It is located at a longitude of 34.4824508 and latitude of 7.8476356 on the Alwero river, Abobo, Gambela Region. It was constructed for irrigation, with a water capacity of 74.6 million cubic metres, and a dam height of 22 metres. This offers a conducive environment for water resources development for the population settled in the lowlands area to irrigate agriculture lands in the local region. It drains into the Nile Basin and has the capacity to irrigate over 10,000 hectares (100,000,000 m^{2}) of land.
