= Sor River =

River in Ethiopia

Location
- Country: Ethiopia
- Regions: Oromia, SWEPR

Physical characteristics
- Source
  - coordinates: 7°35′59.4″N 35°49′8.5″E
  - elevation: 2,797 m (9,177 ft)
- Mouth: Birbir River
  - coordinates: 8°30′48″N 35°11′17″E
  - elevation: 815 m (2,674 ft)
- Length: 231 km (144 mi)
- Basin size: 6,650 km^{2} (2,570 sq mi)
- Discharge
  - location: Mouth (estimate)
  - average: 86.6 m^{3}/s (3,060 cu ft/s)
  - minimum: 10.5 m^{3}/s (370 cu ft/s)
  - maximum: 230.9 m^{3}/s (8,150 cu ft/s)

Basin features
- Progression: Birbir → Baro → Sobat → White Nile → Nile → Mediterranean Sea
- River system: Nile
- Population: 978,000

The Sor is a river of southwestern Ethiopia. A tributary of the Birbir River on its left side and joins it at latitude and longitude 8°30′48″N 35°11′17″E, the Sor rises in Sayo.

== See also ==
- List of rivers of Ethiopia
- Metu, Ethiopia
