= Mount Welel =

Mountain in southwestern Ethiopia

Welel
- Location within Ethiopia

Highest point
- Elevation: 3,301 m (10,830 ft)
- Prominence: 1,720 m (5,640 ft)
- Listing: Ultra; Ribu
- Coordinates: 8°52′39″N 34°48′42″E

Geography
- Location: Mirab Welega Zone, Oromia Region, Ethiopia
- Parent range: Ethiopian Highlands

Mount Welel (also known as Tullu Welel) is a mountain in southwestern Ethiopia. Located in the Mirab Welega Zone of the Oromia Region, it has an elevation of 3,301 metres (10,830 ft) above sea level. Characterized by twin peaks, Welel is the highest point in the zone and Hawa Welele woreda.

== Human history ==
The name of the mountain is Oromo in origin, and the people of the Oromia region considered it sacred. According to author Mohammed Hassan, they named the peak after a mountain in Meda Welabu, which he considers to have been "the region of Borana dispersal in the early sixteenth century".

The Dutch explorer Juan Maria Schuver reached Mount Welel August 1882, but he declined to attempt to climb it, explaining in his memoirs that "an escort of 100 men would have been needed to reach the top, as the mountain and a large extent of the forest around it, are inhabited by fugitive slaves and criminals from different tribes."

In his book In Search of King Solomon's Mines, Tahir Shah explains that he first learned of this mountain in the memoirs of the explorer Frank Hayter, The Gold of Ethiopia, which was written in 1936. In the book, Hayter claimed to have found a shaft full of gold in the mountain, which he claims was the source of the wealth of the Queen of Sheba, but misfortune prevented him from benefiting from his discovery. Although in an interview with Richard Pankhurst he learns that Hayter is "rather unreliable", locating this mountain becomes Tahir Shah's goal in his further travels through Ethiopia, which he eventually reaches. When he reaches Begi, the locals warn him that the mountain is the home of the Devil; when he reaches the base of Mount Welel, he finds the land almost empty of people, and that the locals apparently sell the local crops to people in Gambela because they believe the harvest to be poisonous. In the penultimate chapter he describes reaching the mountain and finding a cave entrance, although at first he believes it is the entrance to the mines Hayter claimed to have discovered, upon investigation it took him no further than 20 feet into the mountain.

== See also ==
- List of Ultras of Africa
