= Gidami (woreda) =

Administrative division of Ethiopia

Coordinates: 9°00′N 34°35′E

Gidami is one of the woredas in the Oromia Region of Ethiopia. It is part of the Kelem Welega Zone. The administrative center of this woreda is Gidami. Dale Sedi was separated from former Jimma Gidami woreda.

== Demographics ==
The 2007 national census reported this woreda's population as 85,904, of whom 43,337 were men and 42,567 women; 5,602 or 6.52% of its population were urban dwellers. The majority of the inhabitants (48.88%) observed Ethiopian Orthodox Christianity, while 37.22% were Protestants, and 13.75% observed Islam.
