= A5 road (Ethiopia) =

Road in Ethiopia

A5 Road

Route information
- Maintained by Ethiopia National Highways Authority

Major junctions
- North end: Addis Ababa
- South end: Gedi Adis

Location
- Country: Ethiopia

Highway system
- Transport in Ethiopia

The A5 Road is a national route in Ethiopia. The highway runs for 608 kilometers from east to west. It starts off in Addis Ababa, which is the capital city of Ethiopian and it stretches towards south-western part of the country. It links central highlands to the southern regions.

== Route ==
The A5 Road goes through southwestern Ethiopia and links the capital city Addis Ababa with Metu. The route displays a zig-zag layout, first moving south-west from Addis Ababa to Jimma, then a winding course northwards and westwards finally ending at Metu town. The eastern part of this major highway connecting Addis Ababa to Welkite runs on top of flat land. After reaching Welkite, the road begins to curve more till it arrives at Jimma.

== History ==
The construction of the road from Addis Ababa to Jimma was one of the main roads in Ethiopia during the period of Italian colonialism. Afterwards, part of the route between Addis Ababa and Metu became known as Route 7 but its western part changed from the current A5. In detail, it moved from Jimma to Mizam Teferi which then turned northwards towards Metu, covering an overall distance of 720 kilometers. When a road renumbering system was introduced around 2013, the route from Jimma to Metu was transformed into a shortened, secondary link road while upgrading works took place along the western section up until Jimma between 2006 and 2012 that included major asphaltization activities.
