= Maria Abbebù Viarengo =

Ethiopian-born writer living in Italy (born 1949)

Maria Abbebù Viarengo (born 1949) is an Ethiopian-born writer living in Italy.

The daughter of a father who came to Ethiopia from Piedmont in 1928 and an Oromo mother, she was born in Gidami and grew up in Ethiopia and Sudan. Her mother died at a young age and her father brought her to Turin in northern Italy in 1969. This both saved her from the instability of Ethiopia but also cut her ties to her mother and her African roots.

In her writing, Viarengo explores her mixed cultural heritage as well as her exposure to both Italian and the Oromo language. She sees herself treated as neither Italian nor African.

== Selected works ==
- Andiamo a Spasso?, memoir (1994)
