= Hozo language =

Afroasiatic language of Ethiopia

Hozo
- Native to: Ethiopia
- Region: in Benishangul-Gumuz Region, South of Asosa
- Native speakers: 6,000 (2015)
- Language family: Afro-Asiatic: Omotic; Mao; Hozo

Language codes
- ISO 639-3: hoz
- Glottolog: hozo1236
- ELP: Hozo

Hozo and some other minority languages in Western Oromia and Southwestern Benishangul-Gumuz. From: From Küspert-Rakorondrainy, Sophie and Klaus-Christian Küspert 2022:3; modified

Hozo is one of the so-called Mao languages (from moó in Hozo and maáy in Seze, both meaning 'human') found in the western Oromia Regional State and the southwestern Benishangul-Gumuz Regional State in Ethiopia. This group comprises four languages belonging to the Omotic languags within the Afro-Asiatic language family: Seze, Hozo, Bambasi Mao, and Ganza. The speakers of Hozo prefer to call their language Ak'mo Wàandi meaning 'mouth of man' .Seze and Hozo are relatively closely related, though they are not necessarily mutually intelligible. Overall, however, "Mao" is primarily an ethnic term; for instance, some speakers of Gwama — a Nilo-Saharan language spoken in the vicinity of Begi and Tongo — also refer to themselves and their language as "Mao," whereas speakers of the related Komo language reject this label. There is a kind of Mao identity across language differences in Ethiopia, at least in contrast to the dominant Oromo ethnic group. Throughout the entire region, Oromo speakers constitute a clear majority, and Oromo serves as the dominant lingua franca and the sole language of instruction in all schools.

== Geographic distribution ==
The Hozo-speaking area lies on both sides of the vast Dabus swamps in Oromia Regional State. The list of villages may not be complete, as no field research was conducted south and southeast of the Dabus River.

Hozo is spoken in western Oromia Regional State on both sides of the Dabus River, with a centre in Western Wollega Zone: in the east and south of K’ondala Woreda, in the west of Babo Gambel Woreda and in the very south of Mana Sibu Woreda. Furthermore, Hozo is spoken south of the Dabus River in K’elem Wollega Zone: in northern Gawo K’ebe Woreda, and probably also in Jima Horo Woreda and maybe even in Gidami Woreda. There is also a significant number of emingrated Hozo speakers in Asosa, the capital of Benishangil Gumuz Regional State, mostly amongst students. In major villages throughout the area, Hozo speakers are a clear minority; however, they may still form a relative majority in some settlements or parts of settlements close to the Dabus swamps.

It is striking that all Hozo-speaking settlements seem to be located along the Dabus swamps, both on the right and left banks of the river. This suggests that the Dabus with its extensive swamp area and significant seasonal flooding, is not dividing, but functions as a unifying element and that Hozo can be considered as the language of the swamps. The assumption that life on and in the swamps is a determining cultural element of the Hozo speakers is supported by a large number of words that are associated with life in the swamps - such as plant and animal names, fishing techniques, water transport, etc. Examples may be t’eka ‘jump from dry land to dry land’ (in the swamps) or kòrka ‘dry grass land’ (in the swamps) or just the river name as dèe haanni ‘Dabus River’ from dèe ‘big, original’ and haanni ‘water’. Traditional stories of the Hozo speakers indicate that their life and their self-image are strongly based on life along the Dabus, but also that they are increasingly being pushed into the largely inhospitable Dabus swamps.

== Classification ==
Most of the Mao languages belong to the Omotic language group within the Afro-Asiatic language family. Highland Gwama is the only language belonging to the Nilo-Saharan family whose speakers call themselves Mao. Speakers of the other related Koman languages of the area, Lowland Gwama and Komo (as well as Uduk and Opo) do not designate themselves as Mao and it is unclear to what extent the term Akʼmo Wàandi applies to their languages in the eyes of Hozo speakers. The fact that the Mao languages in western Ethiopia belong to two distinct families has been definitively established by M. Lionel Bender 1975. In his ground-breaking article, Bender lists four groups “usually referred to as ‘Mao’”: “(1) Anfillo […] (2) The Komo and Kwama [Gwama] of west and south of Begi […], (3) The Hozo and Sezo clans of the Begi area; (4) The Maramo clans of the Bambeshi area […]” (Bender 1975:128). He states that (1), (3) and (4) are Omotic-speaking groups, although Anfillo on the one hand and Hozo, Seze and “Bambeshi” on the other belong to different branches of the Omotic languages, whilst (2) Komo and “Kwama” (Gwama) are Koman (Nilo-Saharan) languages. However, amongst speakers of a language/dialect cluster linguistically classified as Gwama, striking cultural differences emerge between groups of speakers who call themselves Mao and those who strictly reject this designation.

The scientific discussion with regard to the internal classification of the Omotic Mao languages is thoroughly documented in Ahland 2012. While it is generally accepted today that Omotic is one of the primary branches of the Afro-Asiatic language family, the position of the four Mao languages Hozo, Seze, Ganza and Northern Mao (Bambasi) within the Omotic family is still being discussed. Ahland 2012:15 refers to Bender 2003 who suggests a 2-way split from Proto-Omotic into Mao and all other Omotic languages and to Hayward (2000) who classifies the Mao languages as one member of a 3 way split from Proto-Omotic into Mao, South Omotic and North Omotic. Ahland further refers to Bender 2000 who states that the Mao languages are the most divergent in Omotic and supports a 2-way split solution lumping Omotic Mao in one group and all other Omotic languages in another branch.

== Number of speakers ==
It is difficult to estimate the number of speakers of the various Mao languages. This is partly due to the lack of reliable data from the region (the last general census was in 2007), but mainly due to the fact that the linguistic and ethnic terms, especially the term Mao, are ambiguous and complex.

The situation is particularly difficult for Hozo, as the speakers of this language (dialect cluster) do not have a uniform self-designation; it can be assumed that a relatively large number of Hozo speakers are unreported or that they indicate the majority language as their mother tongue. The Ethnologue estimates the number of Hozo-Speakers ([hoz]) at around 6,000. However, this figure is likely too low, as this number is based on studies on the geographical distribution of the languages which was only conducted in Kʼondala and Babo Gambel Woredas. However, more recent research has shown, that there is a significant number of Hozo speakers (i.e. speakers of the dialects summarised here as Hozo) also in the south of Mana Sibu Woreda and in at least two Woredas in the Kʼelem Wäläga Zone south of the Dabus River. Rough estimates therefore put the number of Hozo speakers at as many as 10,000 to 12,000. However, this does not say anything about the level of language proficiency, as the younger generation in villages with schools in particular are likely to have only limited language skills.

== Degree of endangerment ==
All Mao (and Komo) languages in western Ethiopia are at risk, although the situation in Benishangul Gumuz and Oromia is different. According to The Ethnologue 2026 , the languages are classified as follows:

Hozo: 7 – shifting; Seze: 7 – shifting; Gwama 6b - threatened; Komo: 6a - vigorous; Ganza 6a - vigorous; Northern Mao: 5 - developing.

Interviews with Hozo and Seze speakers indicate that educational environments strongly encourage the use of Oromo. Consequently, Oromo has become their preferred choice for public communication. The impact of Christian missions is multifaceted. Participation in local churches often correlates with unintended social pressure toward cultural and linguistic assimilation.

Recently, the situation seems to be changing slightly, as better-educated Hozo speakers are increasingly developing an awareness of their language and culture. Whether this will be able to halt the impending disappearance of Hozo remains to be seen.

== History of scholarship ==
After World War II, efforts began to document Ethiopia’s history; however, much more attention was paid to the northern region, which had many Christian communities, a connection to the Ark of the Covenant, and the rock-hewn churches. Little attention was paid to the southern and southwestern Omo valley. Then a socialist coup in 1974 halted most research and expeditions, leaving vast gaps of knowledge about Omotic speakers and their history. Omotic languages are not well studied.
