= Nejjo Airport =

Airport in Ethiopia

Nejjo Airport Nedjo, Nejo
- IATA: NEJ; ICAO: HANJ

Summary
- Airport type: Public
- Serves: Nejo
- Elevation AMSL: 6,150 ft / 1,875 m
- Coordinates: 9°31′20″N 35°29′45″E

Map
- Location of the airport in Ethiopia

Runways
Direction	Length		Surface
Direction	ft	m	Surface
01/19	3,220	980	Dirt
- Source: Google Maps

Nejjo Airport (IATA: NEJ, ICAO: HANJ) is an airstrip serving the town of Nejo in western Ethiopia. The runway boundaries are unmarked and poorly defined.

== See also ==
- Transport in Ethiopia
