= Gidami =

Gidami Gidaamii
- Town
- Location within Ethiopia
- Coordinates: 8°59′N 34°37′E
- Country: Ethiopia
- Region: Oromia
- Zone: Kelem Welega
- Woreda: Gidami
- Elevation: 1,776 m (5,827 ft)

Population (2005)
  - Total: 5,007
- Time zone: UTC+3 (EAT)

Gidami is a town in western Ethiopia. Located in the Kelem Welega Zone of the Oromia Region, this town has a latitude and longitude of 08°59′N 34°37′E with an elevation between 1776 and 1928 meters above sea level. It is the main town of Gidami woreda.

== History ==
Charles W. Gwynn wrote that he was detained at Gidami for a month in 1900, then the seat of Dejazmach Jote Talu, while making an official reconnaissance of the Ethiopia–Sudan border; Dejazmach Jote was absent from Gidami during his stay, but Gwynn later learned that Gidami "was distinguished for having stopped three European Expeditions in the course of a few years -- Bottego's, Mangin's, and my own."

By the early 1930s, Gidami was an important coffee market with two or three resident foreign traders. In 1938, the Guido described the town as a large village with many Amhara in an area populated by the Oromo, having a post office, telegraph and infirmary.

On 18 October 2006, Gidami and Begi (town) were the setting for clashes between Muslims and Protestant Christians, resulting in 9 deaths, including the death of two Protestant preachers, and over 100 injured. In addition, 21 churches, one mosque, and dozens of houses were burned, leaving over 400 people homeless.

== Demographics ==
Based on figures from the Central Statistical Agency in 2005, Gidami has an estimated total population of 5,007 of whom 2,545 are men and 2,462 are women. The 1994 census reported this town had a total population of 2,798 of whom 1,380 were men and 1,418 were women.
