= Nejo =

Town in Oromia Region, Ethiopia

- Location within Oromia
- Coordinates: 9°30′N 35°30′E
- Country: Ethiopia
- Region: Oromia
- Zone: West Welega
- Elevation: 1,821 m (5,974 ft)

Population (2005)
  - Total: 19,887
- Time zone: UTC+3 (EAT)

Nedjo (also transliterated Nejjoo) is a town in western Ethiopia. Located in the West Welega Zone of the Oromia Region, this town has a latitude and longitude of 9°30′N 35°30′E with an elevation of 1821 meters above sea level. It is the administrative center of Nejo woreda. Nejo is served by Nejjo Airport and is 150 km east of Asosa Airport.

In his travel book, In Search of King Solomon's Mines, Tahir Shah described Nejo in the late 20th century as a town with "a muddy main street", lined with "buildings with corrugated iron roofs and cement walls". He stops in a bar where "kerosene and sawdust had been sprinkled on the floor to keep away the flies."

== History ==
Near Nejo at the hill of Guté Dili, on 14 October 1888 the joint forces of Ras Gobana Dacche and Moti Moroda Bekere defeated the invading army of Khalil al-Khuzani, an officer of the Abdallahi ibn Muhammad who had invaded Wellega. At the time, Nejo was a trading center of the Sibu Oromo. Dejazmach Kumsa Moroda or Dejazmach Gebre Egziabher moved his residence from Nekemte to Nejo, where around 1893 he built the church of Kidane Mihret, the second Ethiopian Orthodox church in Sibo province; priests for the church were recruited from Shewa.

In 1904 Onesimos Nesib arrived at Nejo to establish a mission, together with his wife, his children, and a group of associates including Aster Ganno. He had originally gone to Nekemte, but learning that Dejazmach Gebre Egziabher had relocated to Nejo followed him there. The Dejazmach invited Onesimos to settle next to his gebbi, gave him a large piece of tax-free land, and built him a house and a school. By September of that year, Onesimus had 20 students in his school. In November 1905 Dejazmach Gebre Egziabher moved his residence back to Nekemte, and he took Onesimus along. The school had as many as 68 students, but closed when Onesimos and Aster left. About this time, Nejo had become a significant market center for gold from the nearby Abay and Dabus rivers. "The stock-in-trade is a small neatly worked basket," wrote Herbert Weld Blundell who visited the area in 1905, "containing pebbles ground to equal the weights required for weighing out the gold, a small copper balance, and finally, the gold-dust in quills The amount of gold exported from Nejjo has been put by engineers living there at about £80,000 a year, and the tribute of the king is about one-half of this."

The Evangelical mission was revived in 1927, when Pastor Martin Nordfeldt and his family arrived from Nekemte in July of that year. During their stay, the Nordfeldts wrote an Oromo grammar which was printed in the Swedish journal Le monde oriental. Nejo became something of a mining center in 1929, when important occurrences of gold were found in the area.

Although the Evangelical church had survived the Italian occupation, despite being converted to a Roman Catholic church, after their expulsion Fitawrari Danye and his soldiers allegedly vandalized the building, stealing everything of value, knocking the altar to pieces, and used the church building as a stable. The other mission buildings were likewise pillaged. Despite this, by the late 1940s the mission was once again in operation.

== Demographics ==
Based on figures from the Central Statistical Agency in 2005, Nejo has an estimated total population of 19,887, of whom 9,811 are men and 10,076 women. The 1994 census reported this town had a total population of 11,125 of whom 5,321 were men and 5,804 were women.

== Climate ==
Climate data for Nejo, elevation 1,800 m (5,900 ft)
Month	Jan	Feb	Mar	Apr	May	Jun	Jul	Aug	Sep	Oct	Nov	Dec	Year
Mean daily maximum °C (°F)	27.6 (81.7)	28.7 (83.7)	29.2 (84.6)	28.7 (83.7)	25.7 (78.3)	23.3 (73.9)	21.7 (71.1)	22.1 (71.8)	23.2 (73.8)	24.3 (75.7)	24.8 (76.6)	26.5 (79.7)	25.5 (77.9)
Daily mean °C (°F)	19.6 (67.3)	20.5 (68.9)	21.3 (70.3)	20.8 (69.4)	19.7 (67.5)	17.8 (64.0)	16.7 (62.1)	17.1 (62.8)	17.5 (63.5)	18.2 (64.8)	18.5 (65.3)	18.8 (65.8)	18.9 (66.0)
Mean daily minimum °C (°F)	11.8 (53.2)	13.3 (55.9)	14.3 (57.7)	14.1 (57.4)	13.8 (56.8)	13.1 (55.6)	13.0 (55.4)	12.8 (55.0)	12.3 (54.1)	12.8 (55.0)	12.6 (54.7)	12.1 (53.8)	13.0 (55.4)
Average precipitation mm (inches)	5 (0.2)	13 (0.5)	31 (1.2)	70 (2.8)	184 (7.2)	340 (13.4)	322 (12.7)	350 (13.8)	319 (12.6)	116 (4.6)	33 (1.3)	5 (0.2)	1,788 (70.5)
Average relative humidity (%)	49	49	49	52	74	84	87	86	80	75	67	57	67
Source: FAO

== See also ==
- List of cities and towns in Ethiopia
