= Seze language =

Omotic language spoken in Ethiopia

Seze
- Native to: Ethiopia
- Region: West Oromo region
- Native speakers: 13,000 (2015)
- Language family: Afro-Asiatic: Omotic; North; Mao; Seze

Language codes
- ISO 639-3: sze
- Glottolog: seze1235
- ELP: Sezo

Seze (or Sezo) is an Afro-Asiatic Omotic language, spoken in the western part of Ethiopia, near the town of Begi and just north of the Hozo-speaking community.
