= Mana Sibu =

Administrative division of Ethiopia

Coordinates: 9°40′N 35°15′E

Mana Sibu is one of the 180 Aanaas in the Oromia Region of Ethiopia. Part of the West Welega Zone, Mana Sibu is bordered on the south by Jarso, on the southwest by Begi, on the north by the Benishangul-Gumuz Region, and on the southeast by Nejo. Mendi is the administrative center. Kiltu Kara woreda was part of Mana Sibu woreda.

Coffee is an important cash crop of this woreda. Over 50 square kilometers are planted with this crop.

== Demographics ==
The 2007 national census reported this woreda's population as 126,083 in 22,552 households, of whom 64,399 were men and 61,684 women; 14,008 or 11.11% of its population were urban dwellers. The majority of the inhabitants (52.97%) observed Protestantism, while 27.13% observed Ethiopian Orthodox Christianity, and 19.58% were Muslim.

Based on figures published by the Central Statistical Agency in 2005, this woreda has an estimated total population of 182,336, of whom 89,661 are men and 92,675 are women; 22,761 or 12.48% of its population are urban dwellers, which is greater than the Zone average of 10.9%. With an estimated area of 2,487.51 square kilometers, Mana Sibu has an estimated population density of 73.3 people per square kilometer, which is less than the Zone average of 91.7.

The 1994 national census reported a total population for this woreda of 128,876 in 19,239 households, of whom 65,660 were men and 63,216 women; 12,717 or 9.87% of its population were urban dwellers. The two largest ethnic groups reported in Mana Sibu were the Oromo (97.65%), and the Amhara (0.83%); all other ethnic groups made up 1.52% of the population. Oromiffa was spoken as a first language by 97.84%, and 0.81% spoke Amharic; the remaining 1.35% spoke all other primary languages reported. The majority of the inhabitants observed Ethiopian Orthodox Christianity, with 49.59% reporting that as their religion, while 38.12% were Protestant, and 11.84% Muslim.
