= Ganza language =

Omotic language of Sudan and Ethiopia

Ganza
- غانزا Ganzo
- Native to: Sudan, Ethiopia
- Region: Asosa Zone of Benishangul-Gumuz Region, Blue Nile State
- Native speakers: 3,000 (2007)
- Language family: Afro-Asiatic: Omotic; North; Mao; Ganza

Language codes
- ISO 639-3: gza
- Glottolog: ganz1246
- ELP: Ganza

Ganza, also known as Ganzo or Koma, is an Omotic language of the Afro-Asiatic family spoken in the Al Kurumik District of the Blue Nile (state) in Sudan and in the western Benishangul-Gumuz region of Ethiopia, specifically in the village districts of Penishuba and Yabeldigis.

It also goes by the names Ganzo, Gwami, Koma, and Koma-Ganza.

== Phonology ==
		Bilabial	Alveolar	Palatal	Velar	Glottal
Nasal		m	n		ŋ	ʔ̃
Plosive	voiceless	p	t		k	ʔ
Plosive	ejective	pʼ	tʼ		kʼ	
Plosive	voiced	b	d		ɡ	
Fricative	voiceless		s	ʃ		h
Fricative	ejective		sʼ			
Fricative	voiced		z			
Approximant			l	j	w	
Trill			r			

Ganza does not utilize consonant length phonemically.

Vowels
	Front	Back
Close	i	u
Mid	e	o
Open	a	

Although vowel length is typically contrastive in Omotic languages, Ganza does not have a clear contrast between long and short vowel phonemes. Instead, Ganza has predictable utterance-final vowel lengthening and a set of monosyllabic words with double vowels.
