= Birbir River =

Location
- Country: Ethiopia
- Regions: Oromia, SWEPR

Physical characteristics
- Source: Birbir River
  - location: Dibdib, Ethiopia
  - coordinates: 7°42′04″N 35°52′44″E
  - elevation: 2,367 m (7,766 ft)
- Mouth: Baro River
  - location: Seriti, Ethiopia
  - coordinates: 8°14′28″N 34°57′39″E
  - elevation: 557 m (1,827 ft)
- Length: 246.6 km (153.2 mi)
- Basin size: 16,400 km^{2} (6,300 sq mi)
- Discharge
  - location: Mouth (estimate)
  - average: 205.4 m^{3}/s (7,250 cu ft/s)
  - minimum: 21.3 m^{3}/s (750 cu ft/s)
  - maximum: 542.8 m^{3}/s (19,170 cu ft/s)

Basin features
- Progression: Baro → Sobat → White Nile → Nile → Mediterranean Sea
- River system: Nile
- Population: 2,960,000
- Tributaries
  - left: Sor River

The Birbir River of southwestern Ethiopia is a tributary of the Baro River, which it creates at its confluence with the Gebba. It is politically important because its course defines part of the boundary between the Mirab Welega and Illubabor Zones of the Oromia Region. Richard Pankhurst notes that the Birbir is economically important for the discovery in 1904 of deposits of platinum along its course.

== See also ==
- List of rivers of Ethiopia
