= Guliso =

Town located in Oromia state of Ethiopia

Guliso Gullisoo (Oromo)
- Town
- Location within Ethiopia
- Country: Ethiopia
- Region: Oromia
- Zone: West Welega Zone
- Climate: Cwb

Guliso is one of the towns in the Oromia Region of Ethiopia. It is located in West Welega Zone. Guliso is bordered on the south by Genji, on the west by Ayra, on the northeast by Boji, on the east Lalo Asabi

Guliso town is the administrative seat of Guliso district. Other towns in Guliso woreda Dilla and Cheliya Yeka.

The distance between the capital city of Oromia Finfinee and Guliso is around 487 km.

Coffee is an important cash crop of this woreda; over 60 square kilometers are planted with this crop.

== Demographics ==
The 2007 national census reported a total population for this Aanaa of 69,856 in 13,738 households, of whom 34,795 were men and 35,061 women; 7,867 or 11.26% of its population were urban dwellers. The majority of the inhabitants observed Protestantism, with 88.64% reporting that as their religion, while 6.83% observed Ethiopian Orthodox Christianity and 3.69% were Muslim.
