= Gimbi =

Town in Oromia Region, Ethiopia

ጊምቢ (Amharic) Gimbii (Oromo)
- Town
- Location within Ethiopia
- Coordinates: 9°10′N 35°50′E
- Country: Ethiopia
- Region: Oromia
- Zone: West Welega
- Woreda: Gimbi
- Elevation: 1,845 m (6,053 ft)

Population (2007)
  - Total: 30,981
- Time zone: UTC+3 (EAT)

Gimbi (ጊምቢ) is a town in western Oromia Region, Ethiopia. Located in the West Welega Zone, it has a latitude and longitude of 9°10′N 35°50′E with an elevation between 1845 and 1930 meters above sea level. It is the administrative center of Gimbi woreda. The area gets an average of about 1,500 millimeters of rainfall each year, with places like Gimbi receiving over 2,800 millimeters annually. This region is one of the wettest in Ethiopia, only having two to four dry months per year. The rainfall is higher in the mountains, as the terrain there traps more moisture, while the lowlands get less rain.

Gimbi has had telephone service from some point between 1954 and 1967. Iron had traditionally been produced in the area. A North Korean team of specialists investigated the deposits in the mid-1980s.

== History ==
According to d’Abbadie, Gimbi was named after a king. It first appeared on the 1903 map by Hughes Leroux as Mount G. The town was likely founded in the 1910s and initially served as a gébbi (administrative center) for the local Oromo Leeqaa under the rule of Gäbrä Égziýabéher Moroda.

An Ethiopian Orthodox church was built in Gimbi around 1895. By the 1930s, Gimbi was one of the most important markets of Welega Province and a meeting point of roads. The extension of the main road to Nekemte had not yet reached as far as Gimbi by 1935.

A school for the blind was opened in Gimbi by the Western Synod of the Mekane Yesus Church in 1971. However, by 1981 all Evangelical churches in the neighboring region were closed, except the one in the town itself.

Seventh Day Adventist Churches, and Schools, have been serving the city. The Seventh Day Adventist Hospital was the first hospital in Gimbie and was founded in 1947. More recently a government hospital called Gimbie Public Hospital was established. The operational budget of this hospital is government subsidized.

The Oromia TV sub-station and the Gimbi Campus of Wollega University were opened by Regional president Abadula Gemeda 23 February 2009. In June 2022 the Oromo Liberation Front besieged the town and heavy gunfire was reported.

During the Second Italo-Ethiopian War (1935-1937), Gimbi and the surrounding areas were impacted by Italian military movements. In 1936, Swedish missionaries evacuated from Nekemte to Gimbi due to the advancing Italian forces. Dejazmach Habte Mariam, a local leader, initially allowed the Italians to enter Gimbi, which led to criticism from other local leaders. The Italian military's strategy included occupying the region, with troops arriving in Gimbi in October 1936 after a long march. Missionaries like Erik and Gusti Söderström were forced to flee, witnessing Italian aircraft bombing the region during their retreat.

Initially, Ras Imru found support from local leaders such as Fitawrari Yohannes Jote Tulu and Dejazmach Habte Maryam Gebre Egziabher, who governed the regions of Leqa, Wellega, respectively. They joined him in collecting taxes and administering the area.

Despite this initial support, Dejazmach Habte Maryam, (local governor), fled to Gimbi, leaving the soldiers to handle the situation on their own. Among the soldiers were Lieutenant Kifle Nesibu and Dr. Alemework Beyene, who managed to defuse an unexploded bomb and earned the respect of the local people. These soldiers, however, soon spread a false rumor that Dejazmach Fikre Maryam and Dejazmach Balcha had recaptured the capital. This rumor frightened Dejazmach Habte Maryam and Fitawrari Mosa, prompting them to invite the soldiers to spend the rest of the rainy season in the local capital of Lekemt (also known as Nekemt).

It is believed that these locally rooted balabat, who held grudges due to losing their privileges or being imprisoned, were sympathetic to the Italian forces. As a result, Dejazmach Habte Maryam became increasingly hostile towards the resistance forces. When Ras Imru arrived, the soldiers requested his assistance in relocating the resistance to Shewa.

== Demographics ==
The 2007 national census reported a total population for Gimbi of 30,981, of whom 15,716 were men and 15,265 women. The majority of the inhabitants (50.07%) observed Protestantism, while 35.33% observed Ethiopian Orthodox Christianity, and 12.99% were Muslim.

Based on figures from the Central Statistical Agency in 2005, Gimbi has an estimated total population of 36,612, of whom 18,623 are men and 17,989 are women. The 1994 census reported this town had a total population of 20,462 of whom 10,100 were men and 10,362 were women.

== In popular culture ==
In the fictional Harry Potter universe, Gimbi is the hometown of the professional Quidditch team the Gimbi Giant-Slayers.
