= Jimma Horo, Kelem Welega =

District in Oromia Region, Ethiopia

Jimma Horo is a woreda in Oromia Region, Ethiopia. It is part of the Kelem Welega Zone. The administrative center of this woreda is Nunu. Jimma Horo was separated from former Jimma Gidami woreda.

== Demographics ==
The 2007 national census reported a total population for this woreda of 45,889, of whom 23,128 were men and 22,761 were women; 2,845 or 6.2% of its population were urban dwellers. The majority of the inhabitants were Protestants, with 40.52% reporting that as their religion, while 29.86% observed Ethiopian Orthodox Christianity, and 29.44% observed Islam.
