= Dale Wabera =

District in the Oromia Region, Ethiopia

Dale Wabera is one of the woredas in the Oromia Region of Ethiopia. It is part of the Kelem Welega Zone. The administrative center of this woreda is Kake. Dale Wabera was separated from former Gawo Dale woreda.

== Demographics ==
The 2007 national census reported a total population for this woreda of 104,387, of whom 52,319 were men and 52,068 were women; 14,105 or 13.51% of its population were urban dwellers. The majority of the inhabitants were Protestants, with 49.57% reporting that as their religion, while 31.86% observed Islam, and 18.27% observed Ethiopian Orthodox Christianity.
