= Metu, Ethiopia =

Market town in Oromia Region, Ethiopia

Metu Mattuu
- Town
- Location within Ethiopia
- Coordinates: 8°18′N 35°35′E
- Country: Ethiopia
- Region: (Oromia Region) Oromia
- Zone: Illubabor
- Elevation: 1,605 m (5,266 ft)

Population (2007)
  - Total: 28,782
- Time zone: UTC+3 (EAT)

Metu (Oromo: Mattuu) is a market town and separate woreda in south-western Ethiopia. Located in the Illubabor Zone of Oromia along the Sor River, this town has a latitude and longitude of 8°18′N 35°35′E and an altitude of 1605 meters. Metu was the capital of the former Illubabor Province from 1978 until the adoption of the new constitution in 1995.

Metu has been an important market of the coffee trade, with several foreigners residing in the town as early as the 1930s to buy the crops from local farmers. At this early date, the town was connected by telephone to Gore and Addis Ababa. The town's source of electricity is the nearby Sor Hydroelectric Station. The city also has a high school and hospital.

Metu is known for its local waterfalls, the best known being the Sor Falls and the surrounding forest and wildlife.

== History ==
On 9 July 1927, the Greek nationals T. Zewos and A. Donalis were awarded a contract to link the town and Gore by road with Gambela, a distance of 180 kilometers. In the 1930s, Metu was the last stop before reaching Gore. At the time it was a center for mule caravans and later served as a terminal for the Ethiopian Transport Motor Company.

The private weekly Urji reported on 11 July 1995 that some 400 prisoners reportedly escaped when a grenade was set off at the Bishari prison in Metu. The prison guards were killed immediately as well as at least six other people.

== Demographics ==
The 2007 national census reported a total population for Metu of 28,782, of whom 14,400 were men and 14,382 were women. Muxlims are the largest percentage of the inhabitants, with 47.55% of the population reporting they observed this belief, 26% of the population said they were Ethiopian Orthodox, and another 26% were Protestant.

== Climate ==
Climate data for Metu (1971–2000)
Month	Jan	Feb	Mar	Apr	May	Jun	Jul	Aug	Sep	Oct	Nov	Dec	Year
Mean daily maximum °C (°F)	27.5 (81.5)	28.9 (84.0)	29.4 (84.9)	29.3 (84.7)	27.1 (80.8)	25.1 (77.2)	23.4 (74.1)	23.6 (74.5)	24.6 (76.3)	25.7 (78.3)	26.0 (78.8)	27.0 (80.6)	26.5 (79.6)
Mean daily minimum °C (°F)	9.1 (48.4)	10.8 (51.4)	12.4 (54.3)	13.1 (55.6)	13.5 (56.3)	13.3 (55.9)	13.1 (55.6)	13.0 (55.4)	12.9 (55.2)	12.3 (54.1)	10.2 (50.4)	8.2 (46.8)	11.8 (53.3)
Average precipitation mm (inches)	37.0 (1.46)	38.0 (1.50)	76.0 (2.99)	88.0 (3.46)	227.0 (8.94)	272.0 (10.71)	311.0 (12.24)	294.0 (11.57)	306.0 (12.05)	140.0 (5.51)	70.0 (2.76)	28.0 (1.10)	1,887 (74.29)
Average relative humidity (%)	59	55	57	65	76	82	86	86	83	76	71	65	72
Source: FAO
