= Illubabor Zone =

Zone in Oromia Region of Ethiopia

Coordinates: 8°15′N 36°00′E

A map of the regions and zones of Ethiopia

Illubabor (Oromo: Illuu Abbaa Booraa) is one of Zones in Oromia Region of Ethiopia. Illubabora is named for the former province Illubabor. It is bordered on the south by the Southern Nations, Nationalities and Peoples Region, on the southwest by the Gambela Region, on the west by Kelem Welega Zone, on the north by West Welega Zone, and Benishangul-Gumuz Region, on the northwest by East Welega Zone, and on the east by Jimma. Towns and cities in Illubabora include Bedele, Gore and Metu.

The Central Statistical Agency (CSA) reported that 14,855 tons of coffee were produced in this zone in the year ending in 2005, based on inspection records from the Ethiopian Coffee and Tea authority. This represents 12.9% of the Region's output and 6.5% of Ethiopia's total output.

Historically, Illubabora has been considered one of the food-exporting areas of Ethiopia, but beginning in 1997 poor crops harvests and the appearance of crop diseases such as Grey leaf spot, caused by the fungus Cercospora zeaemaydis (not previously common in Ethiopia) led to a deterioration in conditions. By 1999, signs of the seriousness of the situation included empty household granaries, people begging and committing crimes in the hope they will be fed in jail, sending children to live with relatives or friends, and reduced student enrollment in schools.

== Demographics ==
Based on the 2007 Census conducted by the CSA, this Zone has a total population of 2,271,609, an increase of 50.12% over the 1994 census, of whom 636,986 are men and 634,623 women; with an area of 15,135.33 square kilometers, Illubabor has a population density of 84.02. While 124,428 or 12.16% are urban inhabitants, a further 68 persons are pastoralists. A total of 272,555 households were counted in this Zone, which results in an average of 4.67 persons to a household, and 263,731 housing units. The two largest ethnic groups reported in Illubabor were the Oromo (92.67%) and the Amhara (4.37%); all other ethnic groups made up 2.96% of the population. Oromiffa was spoken as a first language by 90.68% and 7.08% spoke Amharic; the remaining 2.24% spoke all other primary languages reported. The majority of the inhabitants were Muslim, with 50.6% of the population having reported they practiced that belief, while 26.51% of the population practiced Ethiopian Orthodox Christianity and 22.51% professed Protestantism.

The 1994 national census reported a total population for this Zone of 847,048 in 187,867 households, of whom 416,456 were men and 430,592 women; 80,290 or 9.48% of its population were urban dwellers at the time. The three largest ethnic groups reported in Illubabor were the Oromo (85.4%), the Amhara (7.34%), and the Tigrayan (1.26%); all other ethnic groups made up 6% of the population. Oromiffa was spoken as a first language by 89.86%, 6.26% Amharic, and 1.09% spoke Tigrinya; the remaining 2.79% spoke all other primary languages reported. The majority of the inhabitants professed Ethiopian Orthodox Christianity, with 45.81% of the population having reported they practiced that belief, while 42.63% of the population said they were Muslim, 9.78% were Protestant, and 1.3% held traditional beliefs.

According to a May 24, 2004 World Bank memorandum, 9% of the inhabitants of Illubabor have access to electricity, this zone has a road density of 43.2 kilometers per 1000 square kilometers (compared to the national average of 30 kilometers), the average rural household has 1.1 hectare of land (compared to the national average of 1.01 hectare of land and an average of 1.14 for the Oromia Region) and the equivalent of 0.6 heads of livestock. 14.7% of the population is in non-farm related jobs, compared to the national average of 25% and a Regional average of 24%. Concerning education, 84% of all eligible children are enrolled in primary school, and 23% in secondary schools. Concerning health, 94% of the zone is exposed to malaria, and 100% to Tsetse fly. The memorandum gave this zone a drought risk rating of 296.
