= Kelam Welega Zone =

Zone in Oromia Region of Ethiopia

Coordinates: 8°47′N 34°46′E

Map of the regions and zones of Ethiopia

Kellem Wollega (Oromo: Qeellam Wallaggaa) is one of the zones of the Oromia Region in Ethiopia. This zone is named after the former province of Wollega, whose western part lay in the area Kellem Wollega now occupies. Kellem Wollega was formed of woredas which included to West Wollega Zone.

== Demographics ==
Based on the 2007 Census conducted by the Central Statistical Agency of Ethiopia (CSA), this Zone has a total population of 797,666, of whom 401,905 are men and 395,761 women. 76,277 or 9.56% of population are urban inhabitants. A total of 159,353 households were counted in this Zone, which results in an average of 5.01 persons to a household, and 152,916 housing units. The two largest ethnic groups reported in Kelem Welega were the Oromo (94.08%) and the Amhara (5.13%); all other ethnic groups made up 0.79% of the population. Afaan Oromoo was spoken as a first language by 94.12% and 5.32% spoke Amharic; the remaining 0.56% spoke all other primary languages reported. The majority of the inhabitants were Protestants, with 48.45% of the population having reported they practiced that belief, while 26.9% of the population professed Ethiopian Orthodox Christianity and 23% of the population were Muslim.
