= West Welega Zone =

Zone in Oromia Region of Ethiopia

Coordinates: 9°00′N 35°15′E

Map of the regions and zones of Ethiopia

West Wollega Zone (Oromo: Wallagga Lixaa) is a zone in the western part of Oromia Region, Ethiopia. This zone is named after the former province of Wollega, whose western part lay in the area West Wollega now occupies.

West Wellega is bordered on the west by Kelam Welega Zone, on the north by the Benishangul-Gumuz Region, on the east for a short space by East Wollega, and on the southeast by Ilu Aba Bor. Its highest point is Mount Welel. Towns and cities in West Wollega include Dambidolo, Gimbi, Mendi, and Nejo.

The Central Statistical Agency (CSA) reported that 40,606 tons of coffee were produced in West and East Wollega combined in the year ending in 2005, based on inspection records from the Ethiopian Coffee and Tea authority. This represents 35.3% of the Region's output and 17.9% of Ethiopia's total output.

== Demographics ==
Based on the 2007 Census conducted by the Central Statistical Agency of Ethiopia (CSA), this Zone has a total population of 1,350,415, of whom 671,538 are men and 678,877 women; with an area of 10,833.19 square kilometers, Mirab Welega has a population density of 124.66. While 146,672 or 7.39% are urban inhabitants, a further 2,578 or 0.19% are pastoralists. A total of 266,773 households were counted in this Zone, which results in an average of 5.06 persons to a household, and 250,473 housing units. The three largest ethnic groups reported in Mirab Welega were the Oromo (96.72%), the Mao (1.45%), and the Amhara (1.2%); all other ethnic groups made up 0.63% of the population. Oromiffa was spoken as a first language by 97.06%, 1.36% spoke Mao, and 1.15% Amharic; the remaining 0.43% spoke all other primary languages reported. The majority of the inhabitants professed Protestant, with 59.55% of the population having reported they practiced that belief, while 20.19% of the population said they were Ethiopian Orthodox Christianity and 19.66% were Muslim.

The 1994 national census reported a total population for this Zone of 1,547,075 in 289,555 households, of whom 766,461 were men and 780,614 women; 132,525 or 8.57% of its population were urban dwellers at the time. The three largest ethnic groups reported in Mirab Welega were the Oromo (96.07%), the Amhara (2.4%), and the Mao (0.86%); all other ethnic groups made up 0.67% of the population. Oromiffa was spoken as a first language by 96.68%, 2.24% Amharic, and 0.67% spoke Mao; the remaining 0.41% spoke all other primary languages reported. The majority of the inhabitants professed Ethiopian Orthodox Christianity, with 44.03% of the population having reported they practiced that belief, while 37.28% of the population said they were Protestant, 16.88% were Muslim, and 1.1% were Catholic.

According to a May 24, 2004 World Bank memorandum, 7% of the inhabitants of West Welega have access to electricity, this zone has a road density of 38.5 kilometers per 1000 square kilometers (compared to the national average of 30 kilometers), the average rural household has 1.2 hectare of land (compared to the national average of 1.01 hectare of land and an average of 1.14 for the Oromia Region) and the equivalent of 0.8 heads of livestock. 20.7% of the population is in non-farm related jobs, compared to the national average of 25% and a Regional average of 24%. Concerning education, 71% of all eligible children are enrolled in primary school, and 29% in secondary schools. Concerning health, 87% of the zone is exposed to malaria, and 71% to Tsetse fly. The memorandum gave this zone a drought risk rating of 369.
