= Jimma Genete =

District in Oromia Region, Ethiopia

Jimma Genete is a woreda in Oromia Region, Ethiopia. It was part of former Jimma Horo woreda. It is part of the Horo Gudru Welega Zone and is bordered on the east by Guduru, on the northeast by Abay Chomen, on the north by Horo, on the west by East Welega Zone, on south by West Welega Zone and on the southeast by Jimma Rare. The administrative center is Harato.

== Demographics ==
The 2007 national census reported a total population for this woreda of 64,158, of whom 31,756 were men and 32,402 were women; 6,966 or 10.86% of its population were urban dwellers. The majority of the inhabitants observed Ethiopian Orthodox Christianity, with 45.97% reporting that as their religion, while 37.55% were Protestants, 11.81% observed traditional beliefs, and 2.86% were Moslem.
