= Guduru =

Guduru may refer to:

- Gudur, a town in Nellore district, Andhra Pradesh, India
- Guduru, Krishna district, a village in Krishna district, Andhra Pradesh, India
- Guduru mandal, Krishna district, Andhra Pradesh
- Guduru (woreda), a district in Oromia Region, Ethiopia
  - Guduru, Ethiopia, a town, the administrative center of the woreda
