= Jardega Jarte =

Administrative division of Ethiopia

Jardega Jarte is one of the woredas in the Oromia Region of Ethiopia. It was part of former Amuru Jarte woreda. Part of the Horo Gudru Welega Zone it is bordered on the east by Abay Chomen, on the south by Horo, on the southwest by Abe Dongoro, on the west by East Welega Zone, on the northwest by Amuru on the north by the Abay River which separates it from the Amhara Region, and on the east by Abay Chomen. The administrative center is Alibo. The other town in this district is jardega ( Jarmet ). The large field which is called Jarmet is found in this district. and the other historical place is Oda Wixar which is found in Darge Koticha Kebele.The district is known for its cattle, crop productivity and production of honey. Also in some Kebeles such as Derge Koticha, Harbu Negaso, Kiltu Cheka, Digalu, Wato and others production of coffee, fruits and vegetables is common.

== Demographics ==
The 2007 national census reported a total population for this woreda of 48,943, of whom 24,475 were men and 24,468 were women; 4,757 or 9.72% of its population were urban dwellers. The majority of the inhabitants observed Ethiopian Orthodox Christianity, with 40.47% reporting that as their religion, while 32.19% were Protestants, 14.42% were Moslem, and 11.45% observed traditional beliefs.
