= Kappaladoddi =

- Village
- Interactive map of Kappaladoddi
- Location in Andhra Pradesh, India
- Coordinates: 16.25134°N 81.11995°E
- Country: India
- State: Andhra Pradesh
- District: Krishna
- Mandal: Guduru

Area
  - Total: 3.27 km^{2} (1.26 sq mi)

Population (2011)
  - Total: 3,142
  - Density: 961/km^{2} (2,490/sq mi)

Languages
  - Official: Telugu
- Time zone: UTC+5:30 (IST)

Kappaladoddi is a village in Krishna district of the Indian state of Andhra Pradesh. It is situated in Guduru mandal. The village is part of the coastal Andhra region and is traditionally associated with handloom weaving and Kalamkari textile art.

== Culture ==
Kappaladoddi reflects the cultural traditions of coastal Andhra Pradesh. Community life is centred around local festivals, agricultural cycles, and traditional occupations. Major festivals celebrated in the village include Ugadi, Sankranti, Navaratri, and Diwali. Telugu is the primary language spoken by the residents.

A substantial proportion of households are engaged in traditional handloom weaving. This occupation has historically formed the economic backbone of the village. In recent decades, the sector has faced economic pressures due to mechanisation and competition from low-cost, machine-produced textiles.

== Kalamkari ==
In addition to handloom weaving, residents of Kappaladoddi are involved in Machilipatnam Kalamkari, a traditional textile art form characterised by hand block printing and the use of natural dyes. Machilipatnam Kalamkari has been granted Geographical Indication (GI) status under the Geographical Indications of Goods (Registration and Protection) Act, 1999, recognising its regional and cultural significance.

== Education ==
Educational facilities in the village include a government-run school under the Government of Andhra Pradesh. An Anganwadi centre operates to provide early childhood education, nutrition, and healthcare support for children below the age of five.

== Governance ==
Kappaladoddi is administered as a gram panchayat and falls within the Pedana Assembly constituency. As of the 2021 panchayat elections, the village president (sarpanch) is Yakkala Madhavi.
