= Pedana kalamkari =

Pedana Kalamkari
- Geographical indication
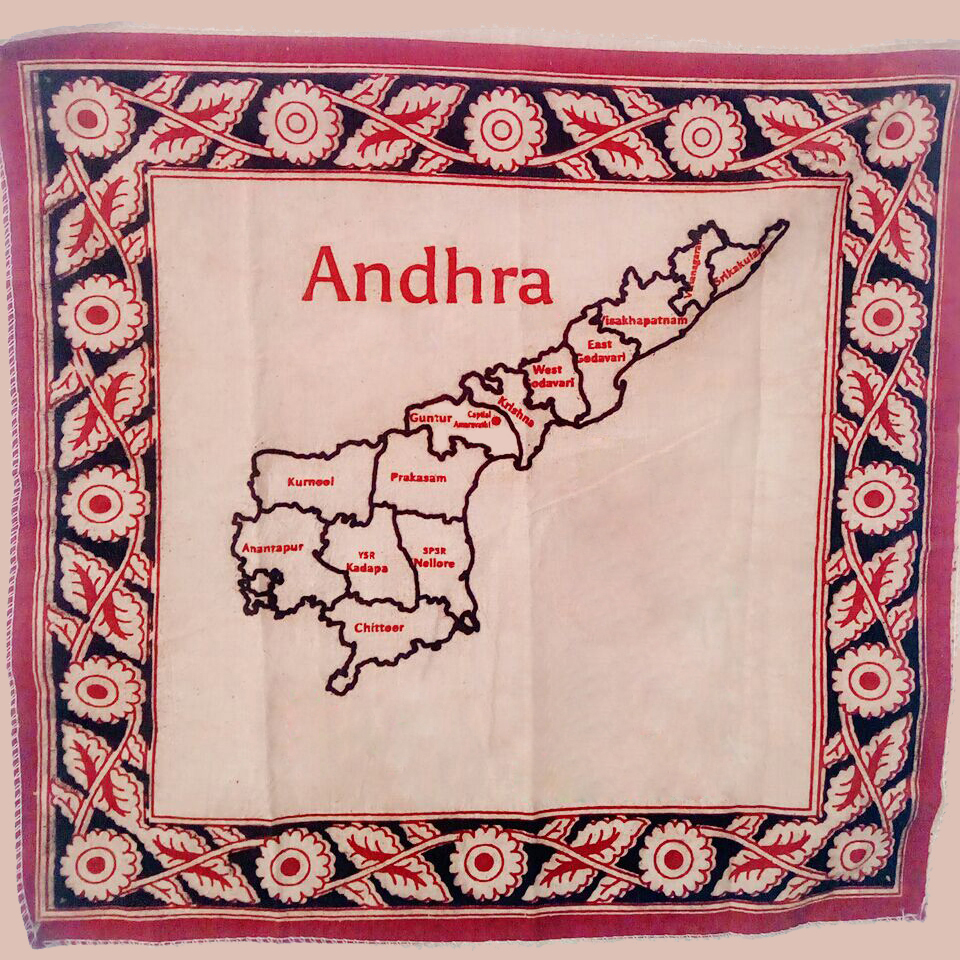
- A Kalamkari handkerchief depicting the Andhra Pradesh Map
- Description: Dyed block-painting on a fabric is a unique Pedana style of Kalamkari work
- Type: Handicraft
- Area: Pedana, Krishna district, Andhra Pradesh
- Country: India
- Material: Fabric: Dye

Pedana Kalamkari also known as Machilipatnam style of Kalamkari work which involves vegetable dyed block-painting of a fabric. it is produced at Pedana a nearby town of Machilipatnam in Krishna district of the Indian state of Andhra Pradesh. It was registered as one of the geographical indication from Andhra Pradesh under handicraft goods by Geographical Indications of Goods (Registration and Protection) Act, 1999.

== History ==
This style of art evolved during the rule of Mughal Dynasty and practiced by Golconda Sultanate. Different textile products produced from this style of work include, wall hangings and clothing like, bedsheets, curtains, saris etc. A wall hanger dating back to 15th Century AD, is still being displayed in Victoria Museum, London.

== Kalamkari work ==
The Machilipatnam style of Kalamkari is one of the two styles of Kalamkari works present in India, with the other being, Srikalahasti style. It mainly uses vegetable dyes which are applied onto the fabric with the help of wooden blocks. According to GIR’s authorised user no – AU/396/GI/19/12, production of Machilipatnam Kalamkari is geographically only limited to Pedana town and its neighbouring villages of Machilipatnam, Polavaram and Kappaladoddi in Guduru mandal of Krishna district.
