= Abe Dongoro =

Administrative subdivision of Ethiopia

Coordinates: 9°30′N 36°50′E

Abe Dongoro is one of the woredas in the Oromia Region of Ethiopia. Part of the Horo Gudru Welega Zone, Abe Dongoro is bordered on the south and west by East Welega Zone, on the west by Gida Kiremu, on the north by Jardega Jarte, and on the east by Jimma Horo. The administrative center of this woreda is Tulu Wayu.

== Overview ==
The landscape of this woreda is primarily rugged, with most parts having an altitude of more than 1500 meters above sea level. The highest point in this woreda, as well as in the Misraq Welega Zone, is Mount Garochan (3276 meters); other major peaks include Mount Bijit, Mount Borge, and Mount Wendo. Rivers include the Arjo, Lugo, Indode, Gerchi, Demonu and Gimbi. An important landmark is the Wochu Falls. A survey of the land in this woreda shows that 40% is arable or cultivable, 5.8% pasture, 25% forest, and the remaining 29.2% is considered mountainous or otherwise unusable. Cash crops include niger seed, sesame and khat. Coffee is the most important, with over 50 square kilometers planted in this cash crop; an area called Laagee is considered to produce one of the best quality coffee beans.

Industry in the woreda includes 3 grain mills. There were 15 Farmers Associations. Abe Dongoro has 20 kilometers of dry weather road and 31 all-weather road, for an average of road density of 47.8 kilometers per 1000 square kilometers. About 5.7% of the total population has access to drinking water.

One displaced farmer claimed that in April 2002 the woreda administration ordered the forced eviction of approximately 250 Amhara from their farms to make the land available to a business investor. An Oromia Regional official acknowledged that a problem existed in the woreda, and the Government was studying the issue.

== Demographics ==
The 2007 national census reported a total population for this woreda of 67,017, of whom 34,126 were men and 32,891 were women; 2,519 or 3.76% of its population were urban dwellers. The majority of the inhabitants observed Ethiopian Orthodox Christianity, with 56.11% reporting that as their religion, while 36.24% were Moslem, 6.23% were Protestants, and 4.37% observed traditional beliefs.

Based on figures published by the Central Statistical Agency in 2005, this woreda has an estimated total population of 54,060, of whom 27,362 are men and 26,698 are women; 1,790 or 3.31% of its population are urban dwellers, which is less than the Zone average of 13.9%. With an estimated area of 1,067.35 square kilometers, Abe Dongoro has an estimated population density of 50.6 people per square kilometer, which is less than the Zone average of 81.4.

The 1994 national census reported a total population for this woreda of 39,042, of whom 19,382 were men and 19,660 women; 1,000 or 2.56% of its population were urban dwellers at the time. The two largest ethnic groups reported in Abe Dongoro were the Amhara (50.69%), and the Oromo (48.14%); all other ethnic groups made up 1.17% of the population. Amharic was spoken as a first language by 50.65%, and 48.24% spoke Oromiffa; the remaining 1.11% spoke all other primary languages reported. The majority of the inhabitants were Ethiopian Orthodox Christianity, with 66.99% of the population reporting they observed this belief, while 29.77% of the population said they were Moslem, 1.94% practiced traditional beliefs, and 1.19% were Protestant.
