= Hababo Guduru =

District in Oromia Region, Ethiopia

Coordinates: 9°40′N 37°30′E

Hababo Guduru is one of woredas in the Oromia Region of Ethiopia. It is part of the Horo Gudru Welega Zone. It was separated from Guduru woreda.

== Demographics ==
The 2007 national census reported a total population for this woreda of 45,325, of whom 22,744 were men and 22,581 were women; 2,364 or 5.22% of its population were urban dwellers. The majority of the inhabitants observed Ethiopian Orthodox Christianity, with 42.15% reporting that as their religion, while 40.19% were Protestants, and 16.93% observed traditional beliefs.
