= Goriparthi Narasimha Raju Yadav =

Indian farmer

- Born: Guduru, Krishna district, Andhra Pradesh, India
- Occupation: Farmer
- Awards: Padma Shri; Krishaka Ratna; Krishi Ratna; Krishi Samrat; ICAR Jagjivan Ram Kisan Puraskar

Goriparthi Narasimha Raju Yadav is an Indian farmer, known for his achievements in agricultural farming. Hailing from the Guduru village, in Krishna district, in the south Indian state of Andhra Pradesh, he is reported to have recorded harvests such as 7.5 to 8.3 tonnes of Pusa Basmati 1 rice per hectare, 3 tonnes of black gram per hectare, and 4 to 5 tonnes of groundnut per hectare. He is also known to have grown a horsegram creeper with over 10,000 branches and a mango tree in his farm yielded 22,000 mangoes in a single season. He has been associated with the expert committees of the Indian Rice Development Council (IRDC) and the Indian Council of Agricultural Research (ICAR) as a member and is a recipient of several awards including Krishaka Ratna, Krishi Ratna, Krishi Samrat and the Jagjivan Ram Kisan Puraskar (1999) of the Indian Council of Agricultural Research. The Government of India awarded him the fourth highest civilian honour of the Padma Shri, in 2009, for his contributions to agriculture.
