= Fincha'a =

- Location within Ethiopia
- Coordinates: 9°54′N 37°27′E
- Country: Ethiopia
- Region: Oromia
- Zone: Horo Guduru Welega Zone
- Elevation: 2,302 m (7,552 ft)

Population (2005)
  - Total: 11,134
- Time zone: UTC+3 (EAT)

Fincha'a (also transliterated Finca'a or Fincaawaa) is a town in western Oromia. Located in the Horo Guduru Welega Zone of the Oromia, Ethiopia. This town has a latitude and longitude of 09°54′N 37°27′E with an altitude of 2302 meters above sea level. Finicha'a hosts an airport (ICAO code HAFN, IATA code FNH) which consists of an unpaved airstrip about 1480 meters in length. It is the administrative center of Abay Chomen woreda.

== Overview ==
Finca'a is near the Finca'a Dam, which was inaugurated by Emperor Haile Selassie in November 1973. At the time the dam was the largest hydro-electric project in the country, built at a cost of over Birr 81 million and with a power output of 84 MW, more than the combined output of the other four power stations which existed at the time. The hydroelectric power plant was overhauled in March 1999 by the Ethiopian Electric Power Corporation at a cost of US $3 million, increasing its hydroelectric capacity to 100 MW.

Previously Finca'a was a location of habitat for the endangered African wild dog, Lycaon pictus, but that canid is thought to be extirpated from the region due to human population expansion.

== Demographics ==
Based on figures from the Central Statistical Agency in 2005, this town has an estimated total population of 11,134 of whom 5,351 are men and 5,783 are women. The 1994 census reported this town had a total population of 6,233 of whom 2,902 were men and 3,331 were women.
