= Guduru mandal, Krishna district =

Guduru
- Mandal
- Interactive map of Guduru
- Location in Andhra Pradesh, India
- Coordinates: 16°N 81°E
- Country: India
- State: Andhra Pradesh
- District: Krishna
- Headquarters: Guduru

Government
  - Body: Mandal Parishad

Area
  - Total: 124.70 km^{2} (48.15 sq mi)

Population (2011)
  - Total: 49,228
  - Density: 394.77/km^{2} (1,022.5/sq mi)

Languages
  - Official: Telugu
- Time zone: UTC+5:30 (IST)
- Vehicle registration: AP 16

Guduru mandal is one of the 25 mandals in Krishna district of the Indian state of Andhra Pradesh. Its headquarters are located at Guduru. The mandal is bordered by Gudlavalleru mandal to the north, Pedana mandal to the east, Machilipatnam mandal to the south and Ghantasala mandal and Movva mandal to the west.

== Demographics ==
As of 2011 census, the mandal had a population of 49,229 living in 14,310 households. The total population constituted 24,823 males and 24,405 females, for a sex ratio of 983 females per 1000 males. There were 4,115 children aged 6 years or below, of which 2,176 were boys and 1,939 were girls, for a sex ratio of 891females per 1000 males. The average literacy rate stood at 72.09% with 32,523 literates, of which 17,302 were males and 15,221 were females. There were 6,946 members of Scheduled Castes and 698 members of Scheduled Tribes.

=== Labor Statistics ===
As per the report published by Census of India in 2011, 26,601 people had a job, including 15,921 males and 10,680 females. As of the census, 21,802 workers described their job as main job, 3,503 worked as cultivators, 11,205 as agricultural labourers, 3,767 in household industry and 3,327 were involved in some other kind of work. Of these, only 4,799 were marginal workers.

== Administration ==
Guduru mandal is administered under the Pedana Assembly constituency of the Machilipatnam Lok Sabha constituency. It is one of the twelve mandals those administration falls under Machilipatnam revenue division.

== Towns and villages ==
As of 2011 census, there are a total of 25 settlements in the mandal. Guduru is the largest and Gandram is the smallest in terms of population.

The settlements in the mandal are:

1. Akulamannadu
2. Akumarru
3. Chittigudur
4. Gandram
5. Gudur
6. Gurijepalle
7. Idugullapalle
8. Jakkamcherla
9. Kalapatam
10. Kanchakodur
11. Kankatava
12. Kappaladoddi
13. Kokanarayanapalem
14. Lellagaruvu
15. Maddipatla
16. Mallavolu
17. Mukkollu
18. Narikedalapalem
19. Pinagudurulanka
20. Polavaram
21. Ramannapeta
22. Ramanuja Varthalapalle
23. Ramarajupalem
24. Rayavaram
25. Tarakaturu

== Education ==
The mandal plays a major role in education for the rural students of nearby villages. The primary and secondary school education is imparted by government, aided by private schools, under the School Education Department of the state. As per the school information report for the academic year 2015–16, the mandal has more than 4,077 students enrolled in over 67 schools.

== See also ==
- List of mandals in Andhra Pradesh
- Vijayawada
