= Jimma Horo, East Welega =

Former district in Oromia Region, Ethiopia

Coordinates: 9°20′N 37°10′E

Jimma Horo was a woreda in Oromia Region, Ethiopia. It was one of the 180 woredas in Oromia Region. Part of the East Welega Zone, Jimma Horo was bordered on the south by the East Shewa Zone, on the southwest by Bila Seyo, on the west by Abe Dongoro, on the northwest by Amuru Jarte, on the northeast by Abay Chomen, on the east by Guduru, and on the southeast by Jimma Rare. The administrative center of the woreda was Shambu; other towns included Harato and Sekela.

Jimma Horo was divided for Horo and Jimma Genete woredas and Shambu town.

== Overview ==
This woreda is characterized by undulating hills and ridges. High points include Mount Belbela, Mount Debisho, Mount Jeldissa, Mount Gudena, and Mount Korma. Rivers include the Geber, Gembo, Deneba, and Abjar Rivers. A survey of the land in this woreda shows that 61.6% is arable or cultivable, 8.0% pasture, 11.1% forest, and the remaining 19.3% is considered swampy, mountainous or otherwise unusable.

Industry in the woreda includes 40 grain mills, 3 edible oil mills and one bakery. There were 27 Farmers Associations with 21,138 members and 15 Farmers Service Cooperatives with 13,974 members. Jimma Horo has 15 kilometers of dry weather road and 89 all-weather road, for an average of road density of 88.5 kilometers per 1000 square kilometers. About 11.7% of the total population has access to drinking water.

== Demographics ==
Based on figures published by the Central Statistical Agency in 2005, this woreda has an estimated total population of 167,670, of whom 85,301 are men and 82,369 are women; 28,295 or 16.88% of its population are urban dwellers, which is greater than the Zone average of 13.9%. With an estimated area of 1,174.54 square kilometers, Jimma Horo has an estimated population density of 142.8 people per square kilometer, which is greater than the Zone average of 81.4.

The 1994 national census reported a total population for this woreda of 117,262, of whom 57,679 were men and 59,583 women; 15,828 or 13.5% of its population were urban dwellers at the time. The two largest ethnic groups reported in Jimma Horo were the Oromo (91.17%), and the Amhara (8.26%); all other ethnic groups made up 0.57% of the population. Oromiffa was spoken as a first language by 92.1%, and 7.69% spoke Amharic; the remaining 0.21% spoke all other primary languages reported. The majority of the inhabitants were Ethiopian Orthodox Christianity, with 71.63% of the population reporting they observed this belief, while 18.49% of the population said they practiced traditional beliefs, 6.09% were Moslem, and 3.44% were Protestant.
