= Wollega University =

Public university in Nekemte, Oromia Region, Ethiopia

- WU
- Other name: Wallaga University
- Former name: Nekemte University
- Motto: Icon of Quality and Relevance
- Type: Public
- Established: February 2007
- Accreditation: Ministry of Education
- Affiliations: Nekemte Campus, Shambu Campus, and Gimbi Campus
- Endowment: Regular, Weekend, Distance, Online, and Summer Programs
- Budget: Government Treasury and Internal Revenue
- President: Dr. Tesfaye Lema Tefera
- Vice-president: Dr Olana Debel; Dr Melka Hika; Dr Temesgen Tilahun; Dr Diriba Diba
- Dean: Dr Belay Beyene; Dr Meseret Belete; Dr Meseret Belete; Dr Morka Amante; Dr Mosisa Geleta; Dr Teferi Terefe; Dr Gimbar Ensarmu; Dr Tefera; Mr Mijena; Mr Elias Tujuba Library Director Dr Teshale Tefera
- Director: Dr Girmaye Kenasa; Dr Thomas Ayana> Dr Berihanu
- Academic staff: 1,112
- Total staff: 5,355
- Students: 30,000
- Undergraduates: 28,000
- Postgraduates: 1,500
- Doctoral students: 500
- Location: Nekemte, Shambu, and Gimbi cities, Western Oromia, Oromia Region, <395>, Ethiopia; 9°4′51.5″N 36°34′57.5″E
- Campus: <5000 hectors; Nekemte main Campus, Shambu Agricultural Campus, Gimbi Social Science Campus
- Language: English, Afaan Oromo and Amharic
- Colors
- Website: www.wollegauniversity.edu.et

Wollega University (WU), also known as Nekemte University, is a public university in Nekemte, a town in the Western Oromia Region of Ethiopia.

== Description ==
WU started out with 1600 students. According to the UCBP, it currently has 4,048 pupils. Wollega is found in western part of Oromia. The institution features 32 departments, with additional facilities planned. Wollega University also provides medical laboratory science training. After renovations, the institution is expected to accommodate 12,000 students.

At present, Wollega University runs 82 undergraduate, 45 graduate programs and 5 PhD programs in the three campuses.

=== Undergraduate programs ===
- College of Engineering and Technology
- Collage of Natural and Computational science
- Institute of Health Sciences
- Shambu Campus, College of Agriculture]] and Natural Resource
- Gimbi Campus, College of Social science and Humanities
- School of Law
- School of Veterinary Medicine
- College of Business and Economics
- Institute of Language and Journalisms

=== Postgraduate programs ===
- Master of Science in Electrical Power Engineering
- Master of Business Administration (MBA)
- Public Administration (MA in PA & MPA)
- Agricultural Economics (MSc in Agricultural EC)
- Development Economics
- MBA in Banking & Finance
- Oromo Language & Literature (MA in OLL)
- Teaching English as a Foreign Language (MA in TEFL)
- Plant Breeding (Master of Science in Plant Breeding)
- Nutrition and Food Science (MSc in NFS)
- Sugarcane Agronomy (MSc in Sugarcane agronomy)
- Political Science (MA in Political Science)
- Master of Public Health/General
- Master of Public Health/Reproductive Health
- Master of Public Health/Microbiology
- Master of Microbial Biotechnology
- Physics/ Master of Science in Physics
- Accounting
- Medical Anthropology
- Masters of public health in psychiatry
- Masters of Advanced Architectural Design

== Campuses ==
Currently Wollega University has three campuses: Wollega University Nekemte Campus (Main Campus) located in East Wollega Zone, Gimbi Campus (College of Social Sciences, Natural & Environmental Sciences) located in West Wollega Zone, and Shambu Campus (College of Agricultural Sciences) located in Horo Guduru Welega Zone. From these respective campuses on 29 may 2013, 2492 students with various field of studies both in 1st and 2nd degree have graduated.

== Science, Technology and Arts Research Journal ==
Science, Technology and Arts Research (STAR) Journal https://journals.wgu.edu.et/ (Online)) is an international, open access, online, print, peer-reviewed, and quarterly publishing journal in all fields of science, technology, and arts-based on its originality, importance, interdisciplinary interest, timeliness, accessibility, elegance, and surprising conclusions. STAR Journal is an official international journal of Wollega University.

== See also ==
- List of universities and colleges in Ethiopia
- Education in Ethiopia
