= Mutcherla =

Mutcherla is a village in Pedana mandal of Krishna District in the Indian state of Andhra Pradesh. The village economy is mainly based on cultivation. It has very fertile land. Paddy is the main crop. Mutcherla Pin code is 521366 and postal head office is Mutcherla.

== Geography ==
Mutcherla belongs to the Andhra region. It is located 27 km towards north from district headquarters, Machilipatnam, 16 km from Pedana; 358 km from the state capital Hyderabad. Cities nearby Mutcherla are: Pedana, Gudivada, Machilipatnam, Bantumilli and Hanuman Junction.

It is near the Bay of Bengal. There can be humidity in the weather, especially in summer.
