= Mallavolu =

- Village
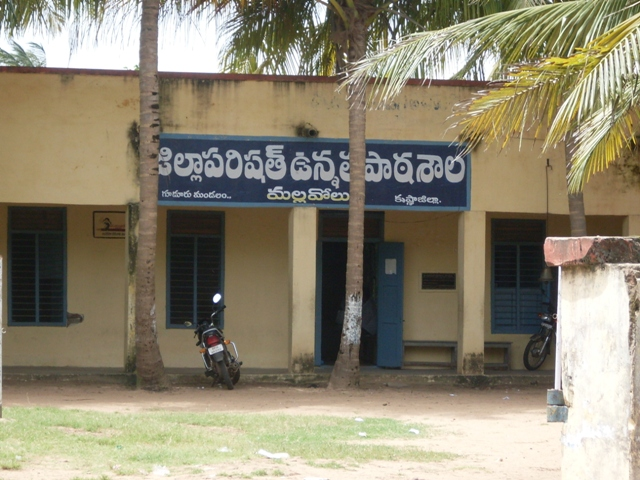
- Mallavolu ZPH school
- Interactive map of Mallavolu
- Location in Andhra Pradesh, India
- Coordinates: 16.1685°N 81.0465°E
- Country: India
- State: Andhra Pradesh
- District: Krishna

Area
  - Total: 25.56 km^{2} (9.87 sq mi)
- Elevation: 4.5 m (15 ft)

Population (2011)
  - Total: 6,886
  - Density: 269.4/km^{2} (697.8/sq mi)

Languages
  - Official: Telugu
- Time zone: UTC+5:30 (IST)
- PIN: 521162
- Telephone code: 08672
- Vehicle registration: AP–16
- Lok Sabha constituency: Machilipatnam
- Assembly constituency: Pedana

Mallavolu is a village in Krishna district of the Indian state of Andhra Pradesh. It is located in Guduru mandal of Machilipatnam revenue division. Current mallavolu panchayat president is Borra Sambaiah elected in 2021 panchayat elections, held on 17 February 2021.

== Demographics ==
As of 2011 census, Mallavolu had a population of 6,886. The total population constitute, 3,455 males and 3,431 females —a sex ratio of 993 females per 1000 males. 579 children are in the age group of 0–6 years, of which 299 are boys and 280 are girls. The average literacy rate stands at 64.15% with 4,046 literates, significantly higher than the state average of 67.41%.

== Government and politics ==
Mallavolu gram panchayat is the local self-government of the village. The panchayat is divided into wards and each ward is represented by an elected ward member.

== Education ==
Zilla Parishad High School in the village is a Zilla Parishad funded school which imparts secondary education.

== Bhavsar kshatriya Community ==
The Bhavsar kshatriya is an ethnic community. Hinglaj Mata or Hingulamba and Matha Sree Ambha Bhavani are regarded as the Kuldevi or the Clan Goddess of the community. The princes sought protection from Lord Parashuram, who had vowed to destroy all Kshatriyas.
