= Pedana mandal =

- Mandal
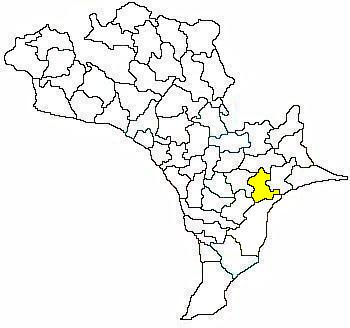
- Interactive Map Outlining mandal
- Location in Andhra Pradesh, India
- Country: India
- State: Andhra Pradesh
- District: Krishna
- Headquarters: Pedana

Languages
  - Official: Telugu
- Time zone: UTC+5:30 (IST)
- PIN: 521 XXX
- Vehicle registration: AP 16

Pedana mandal is one of the 25 mandals in Krishna district of the Indian state of Andhra Pradesh. It is under the administration of Machilipatnam revenue division and the headquarters are located at Pedana. The mandal is bounded by Gudlavalleru, Mudinepalle, Bantumilli, Gudur and Machilipatnam mandals.

== Towns and villages ==
As of 2011 census, the mandal has 31 settlements. It includes 1 town and 30 villages in the mandal.

The settlements in the mandal are listed below:

1. Bahussainpalem
2. Balliparru
3. Chennuru
4. Chevendra
5. Chodavaram
6. Devarapalle
7. Dirisavalli
8. Gurivindagunta
9. Jinjeru
10. Kakarlamudi
11. Kamalapuram
12. Kavipuram
13. Kongamcherla
14. Konkepudi
15. Koppalle
16. Kuduru
17. Kummarigunta
18. Lankalakalavagunta
19. Madaka
20. Mutcherla
21. Mutchiligunta
22. Nadupuru
23. Nandamuru
24. Nandigama
25. Nelakondapalle
26. Pedana (M)
27. Penumalli
28. Pullapadu
29. Serivarthala Palle
30. Singarayapalem
31. Urivi

Note: M-Municipality

== See also ==
- List of villages in Krishna district
