= Guduru, Ethiopia =

Place in southwestern Ethiopia

Guduru
- Town
- Location in Ethiopia
- Coordinates: 09°32′N 37°30′E
- Country: Ethiopia
- Region: Oromia
- Zone: Horo Guduru Welega Zone
- Elevation: 1,969 m (6,460 ft)

Population (2005)
  - Total: 4,557

Guduru (also known as Kombolcha or Kombosha) is a town in south-western Ethiopia. Located in the Horo Gudru Welega Zone of the Oromia Region, this town has a latitude and longitude of 09°32′N 37°30′E and an elevation of 1969 meters above sea level. It is the administrative center of Guduru woreda.

The British traveller C.F. Rey passed through Gudru (which he called "Kombolcha") in December 1926, which he described as a "township" which covered a considerable area with a "straggle" of farmsteads consisting of a tukul and "a largish piece of ground belonging to it, which may or may not be enclosed by a rough fence."

Records at the Nordic Africa Institute website provide details of a primary school in Guduru in 1968, and also mention the presence of a fort and a church.

== Demographics ==
Based on figures from the Central Statistical Agency in 2005, Guduru has an estimated total population of 4,557 of whom 2,196 were males and 2,361 were females. The 1994 census reported this town had a total population of 2,551 of whom 1,191 were males and 1,360 were females.
