= Srikalahasti kalamkari =

Srikalahasti Kalamkari
- Geographical indication
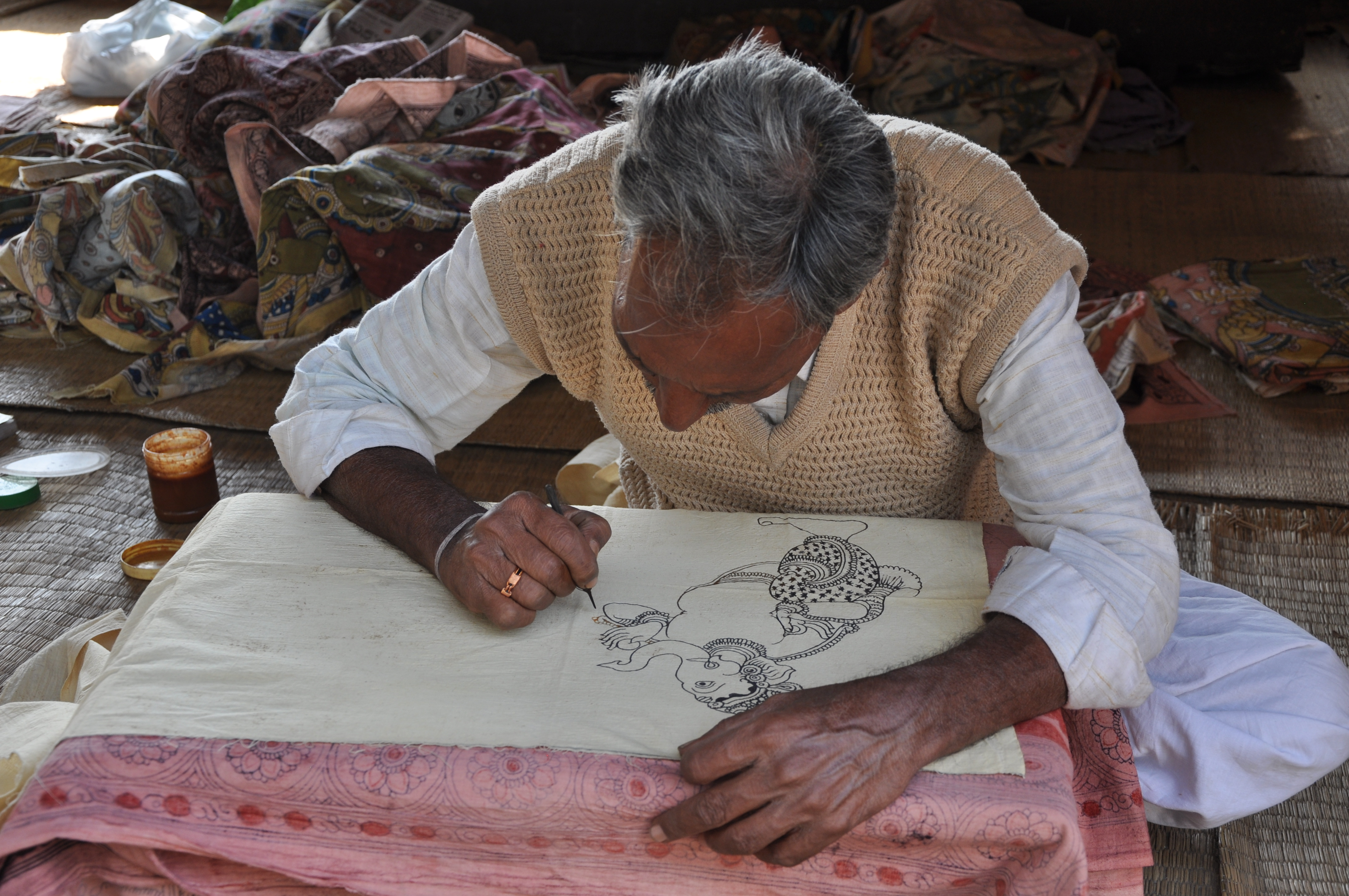
- A Kalamkari artist creating his handicraft
- Description: Dyed hand-painting on a fabric is a unique Srikalahasti style of Kalamkari work
- Type: Handicraft
- Area: Srikalahasti, Tirupati district, Andhra Pradesh
- Country: India
- Material: Fabric: Dye

Srikalahasti Kalamkari is a style of Kalamkari work which involves dyed hand-painting of a fabric. It is produced in Srikalahasti of Tirupati district in the Indian state of Andhra Pradesh. It was registered as one of the geographical indication from Andhra Pradesh, under handicraft goods by Geographical Indications of Goods (Registration and Protection) Act, 1999. GI Application for Srikalahasti Kalamkari was filed by Kalamkari Artisans Revival and Upsurge for National Acclaim (KARUNA).

== History ==
The Kalamkari had its existence during the period of Vijayanagara Empire.

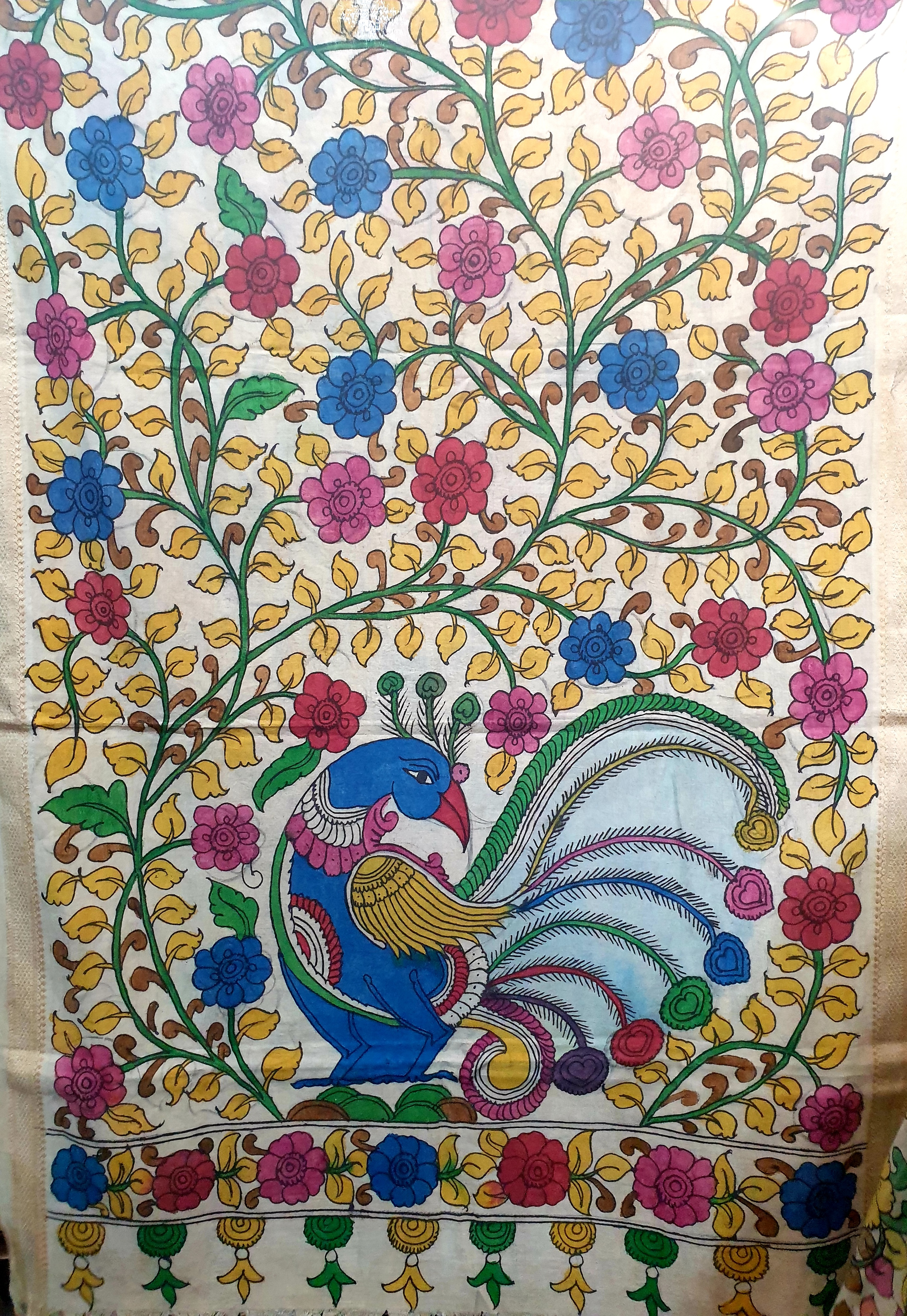

== Kalamkari work ==
The Srikalahasti style of Kalamkari is one of the two styles of Kalamkari works present in India, with the other being, Machilipatnam style. Kalam in persian language means Pen is used for hand drawing and coloring. The usage of pen involves two types, one for drawing made from bamboo, the other for coloring. The coloring process involves usage of only natural dyes which are extracted from flowers and vegetables. All together the entire process involves seventeen steps like block making, cloth treating, printing, washing etc. The Srikalahasti style is used mostly to narrate the religious myths and epics stories on the fabric and also the saris of this style are most notable for its borders and pallu.

== Promoting art ==
Sri Venkateswara Institute of Traditional Sculpture and Architecture (SVITSA) of Tirumala Tirupati Devasthanams offers a professional course on Kalamkari painting for developing new artists. The Andhra Pradesh Economic Development Board took initiative to promote the historical art, solve the industrial challenges, training skilled human resources and to improve revenue generation through exports.

== See also ==
- Navalgund Durries
- Bidriware
- Channapatna toys
- Kinnal Craft
- List of Geographical Indications in India
