= Shambu =

Town in Oromia Region, Ethiopia

Shambu Shambuu
- Town
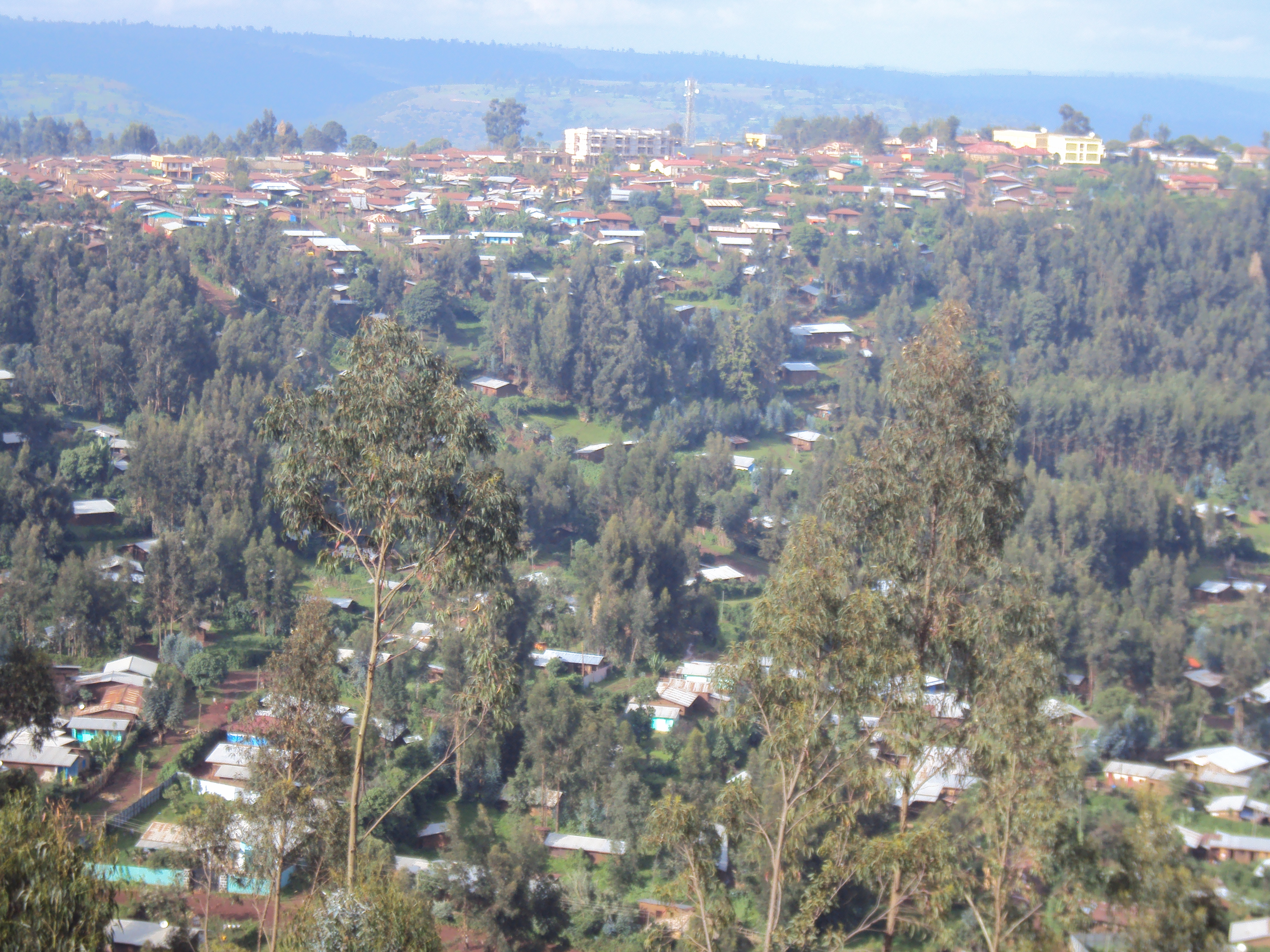
- From top left: Scene of Asosa's arid regions

- Location within Ethiopia Shambu (Africa)
- Coordinates: 9°34′N 37°06′E
- Country: Ethiopia
- Region: Oromia
- Zone: Horo Gudru Welega Zone
- Elevation: 2,503 m (8,212 ft)

Population (2007)
  - Total: 14,995
- Time zone: UTC+3 (EAT)

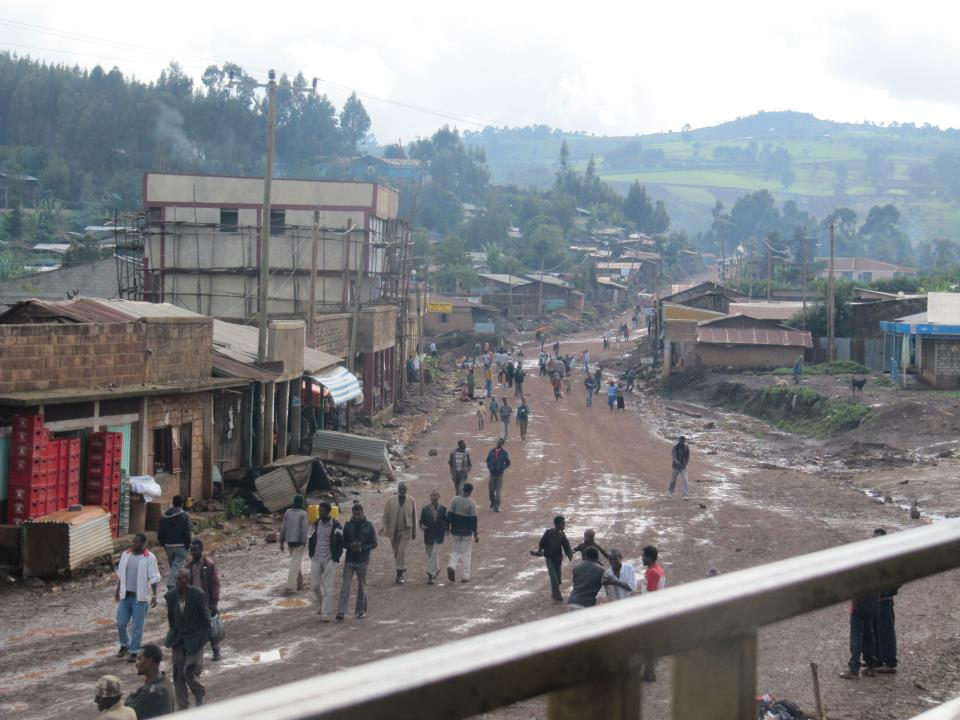
Center of town

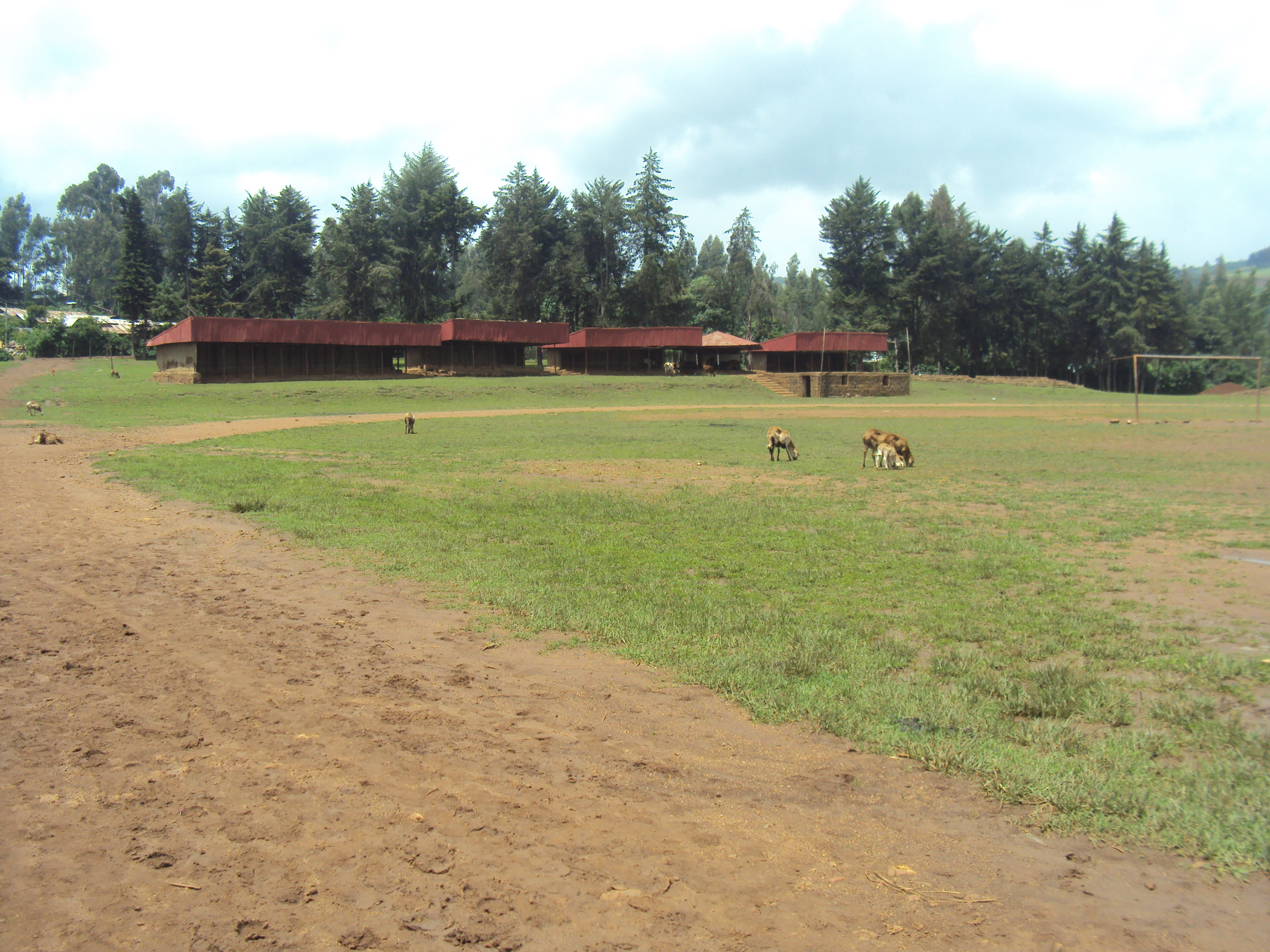
Shambu stadium

Shaamboo is a town and separate woreda in western Ethiopia. Located in the Horo Guduru Welega Zone of Oromia Region west of Lake Fincha'a, this town has an elevation of 2,503 metres above sea level. It was previously the administrative centre of Horro woreda.

== History ==
A Swedish reporter published in 1969, an account of conditions in Shaamboo Prison, which consists of a fenced-in area the size of a football field, and associated buildings. A deep trench 3×5 metres in size is the common latrine for about 130 men and women. Most of the prisoners are chained, and are fed once a day. The eight female prisoners were locked in a single room 8×3 metres and never allowed outside. The men are only confined at night into two rooms 8×12 metres, 60 men in each, and sleep directly upon the wooden floor.

== Demographics ==
The 2007 national census reported a total population for this town of 74,995, of whom 37,757 were men and 37,238 were women. The majority of the inhabitants observed Ethiopian Orthodox Christianity, with 88.24% reporting that as their religion, while 10.32% were Protestants, and 9% were Moslem. The 1994 census reported this town had a total population of 11,327 of whom 5,463 were males and 5,864 were females.

== Schools ==
In the 1930s a schooling system was introduced to Shambu and the surrounding residents, an area where 99.9% of the population lives in a rural-agriculture area and most youths walked to Naqamte for schooling.

=== Primary schools ===
Primary schools in Shambu include:

- Shambu Junior and Elementary School (Est. 1938)
- Shambu Model Primary and Secondary School (Est. 1977)
- Sombo Dedde Primary School (Est. 1989)
- Shambu Bikiltu Primary School
- Shambu Catholic Primary School
- Mati Boru Primary School (private)
- Abishe Garba primary School (private)
- Harbu Lisha primary school
- Laga Warqe primary school
- Shambu Catholic kindergarten School

=== Secondary schools ===
Shambu Preparatory and senior Secondary School established in 1969

=== Tertiary schools ===
Wollega University opened a campus in Shambu in 2010.

Dandii Boruu University College operates a campus in Shambu.

The operational Technical and Vocational Education (TVET) colleges are:

- Shambu TVET
- Shambu College of Teachers Education
- Fincha Valley College
- Odaa Bulluq college
- Shambu TVET & Shambu college of Teachers Education
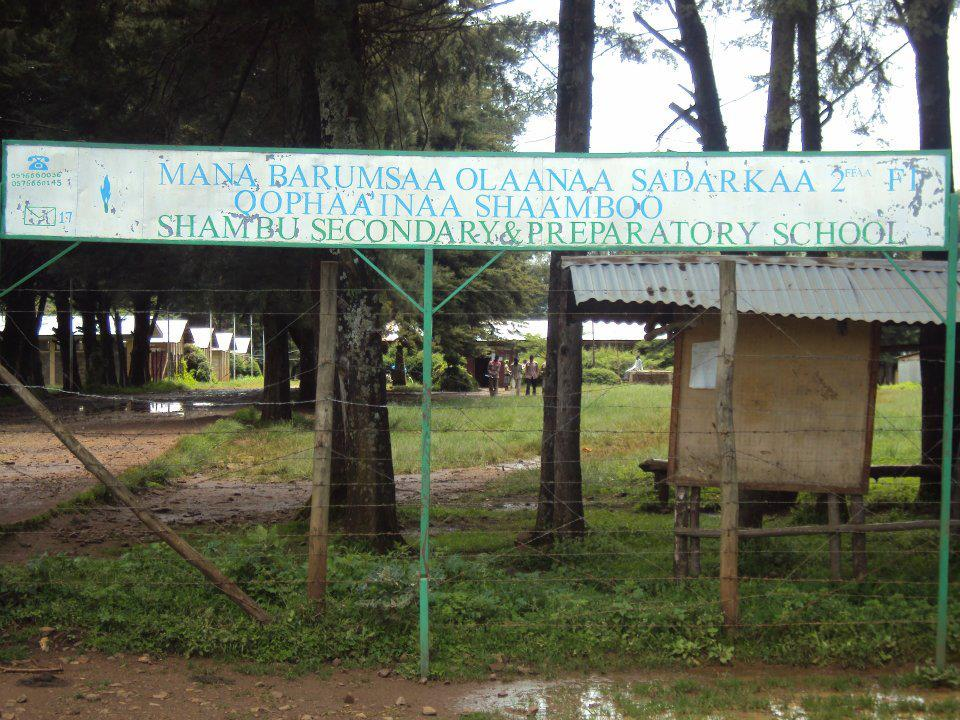
Shambu Secondary & Preparatory School

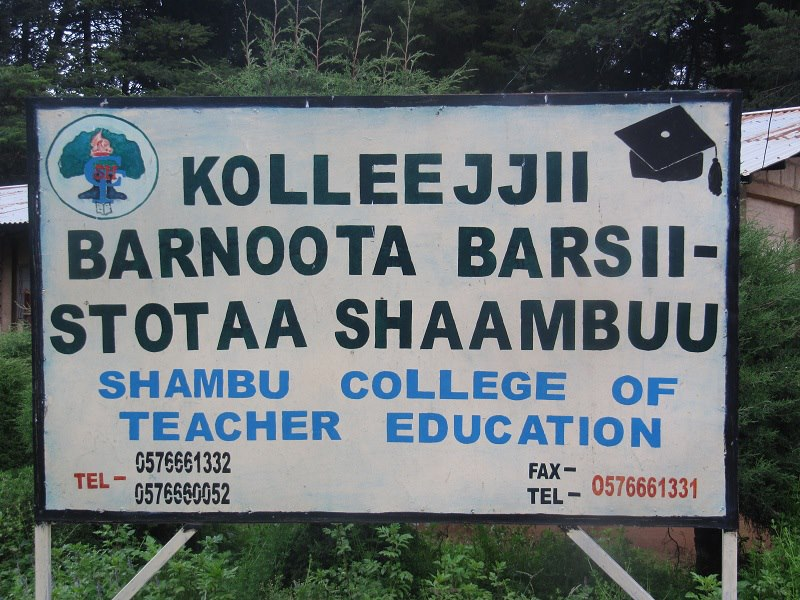
Shambu College of Teachers Education

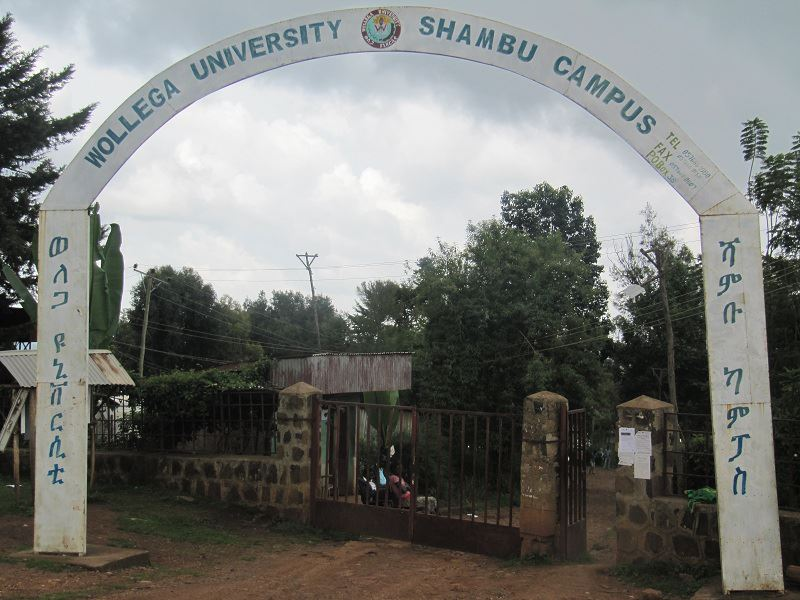
Wollega University, Shambu campus

== Health facilities ==
- Shambu Hospital
- Amen Medium Clinic

== Forests ==
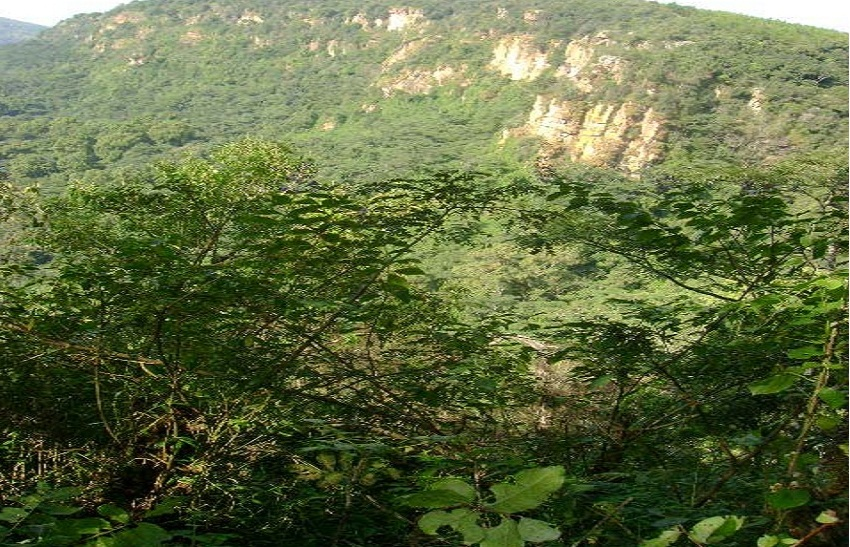
Chato Forest

1. Chato Forest

The largest forest in Horo Gudru Welega Zone is called Chato ('Bosona Caatoo' in Afaan Oromoo). The forest lies approximately between 9 40'- 90 42' N latitudes and 36 59'-37 00'E longitudes (EMA, 1988) in the Horo District 30 km north-west of Shambu which is located at about 314 km west of Finfinne.

This forest is located along altitudinal ranges between 1700 m and 2350 m a.s.l and covers an area of about 42,000 hectares, of these 18, 000 ha is the natural forest (Oromia Agricultural Bureau personal Communication).

2. Qonge Forest

The largest forest in Horo Gudru Welega Zone is called Qonge ('Bosona Qongee' in Afaan Oromoo). The forest lies approximately 9°37'23.0"N latitudes and 37°06'27.2"E longitudes between Horro Bulluq and Horro District 13 km north-west of Shambu which is located at about 314 km west of Finfinne.
