= Jimma Rare =

District in Oromia Region, Ethiopia

Coordinates: 9°10′N 37°20′E

Jimma Rare is a woreda in Oromia Region, Ethiopia. It shares the name of one of the subgroups of the Oromo people, the Jimma Rare. Part of the Horo Gudru Welega Zone, Jimma Rare is bordered on the west by Jimma Horo, on the north by Guduru, on the east and south by the Guder River which separates it from the West Shewa Zone. The administrative center of the woreda is Wayu; other towns in Jimma Rare include Goben and Babal'a.

== Overview ==
The altitude of this woreda ranges from 1540 to 3047 meters above sea level; Mount Tulu Biyyo is the highest point. Rivers include the Dangego and Wengele. A survey of the land in this woreda shows that 73.8% is arable or cultivable, 16% pasture, 4.6% forest, and the remaining 5.6% is considered swampy, mountainous or otherwise unusable. Notable landmarks include Dangogo Falls, Tulu Warabessa, Tulu Mara, Kersa Alatti and Kala Bacha Caves. Niger seed, flax and rape seed are important cash crops.

Industry in the woreda includes 10 grain mills. There were 10 Farmers Associations with 6300 members and 4 Farmers Service Cooperatives with 5145 members. Jimma Rare has 35 kilometers of all-weather road, for an average of road density of 102.6 kilometers per 1000 square kilometers. About 12% of the total population has access to drinking water.

== Demographics ==
The 2007 national census reported a total population for this woreda of 55,580, of whom 27,392 were men and 28,188 were women; 8,633 or 15.53% of its population were urban dwellers. The majority of the inhabitants were Protestants, with 55.91% reporting that as their religion, while 38.49% observed Ethiopian Orthodox Christianity, 3.57% observed traditional beliefs, and 1.47% were Moslem.

Based on figures published by the Central Statistical Agency in 2005, this woreda has an estimated total population of 56,758, of whom 29,238 are men and 27,520 women; 6,197 or 10.92% of its population are urban dwellers, which is greater than the Zone average of 13.9%. With an estimated area of 340.78 square kilometers, Jimma Rare has an estimated population density of 166.6 people per square kilometer, which is greater than the Zone average of 81.4.

The 1994 national census reported a total population for this woreda of 40,270, of whom 19,618 were men and 20,652 women; 3,474 or 8.63% of its population were urban dwellers at the time. The two largest ethnic groups reported in Jimma Rare were the Oromo (97.78%), and the Amhara (2.14%); all other ethnic groups made up 0.08% of the population. The oromo was spoken as a first language by 99.01%, and 0.97% spoke Amharic; the remaining 0.02% spoke all other primary languages reported. The majority of the inhabitants followed traditional beliefs, with 52.14% of the population reporting they observed them, while 26.52% of the population said they were Ethiopian Orthodox, 19.33% were Protestant, and 1.44% were Moslem.
