= Abay Chomen =

Administrative division of Ethiopia

Coordinates: 9°40′N 37°20′E

Abay Chomen is one of the woredas in the Oromia Region of Ethiopia. Part of the Horo Gudru Welega Zone, Abay Chomen is bordered on the south by Lake Finicha'a (created when Finicha'a Dam flooded the Chomen swamp), on the southwest by Jimma Horo, on the northwest by Amuru Jarte, on the north by the Abay River which separates it from the Amhara Region, and on the east and south by Guduru. The woreda capital is Finicha'a; other towns in Abay Chomen include Finicha'a Camp.

== Overview ==
The altitude of this woreda ranges from 880 to 2,400 meters above sea level. Rivers within the woreda include the Nedi, Finchawa, Agemsa, Korke, Gogoldas, Boyi, and Bedessa Rivers. A survey of the land in this woreda shows that 11.4% is arable or cultivable, 2.2% is pasture, 1.4% is forest, and the remaining 83.8% is considered mountainous, unusable, or part of the Finicha'a Sugar Project. Niger seed is an important local cash crop.

Industry in the woreda includes 17 grain mills, 10 oil mills, one bakery, and a sugar factory in Finicha'a. There were 4 Farmers Associations with 3119 members and 4 Farmers Service Cooperatives with 2287 members. Abay Chomen has 69.5 kilometers of all-weather road, for an average road density of 87.8 kilometers per 1000 square kilometers. About 70% of the urban and 12% of the rural population has access to drinking water.

== Demographics ==
The 2007 national census reported a total population for this woreda of 48,316, of whom 24,972 were men and 23,344 were women; 9,440 or 19.54% of its population were urban dwellers. The majority of the inhabitants were Protestants, with 59.73% reporting that as their religion, while 31.84% observed Ethiopian Orthodox Christianity, 5.5% observed traditional beliefs, and 1.61% were Moslem.

Based on figures published by the Central Statistical Agency in 2005, this woreda has an estimated total population of 50,564, of whom 25,017 are men and 25,547 are women; 20,749 or 41.04% of its population are urban dwellers, which is greater than the Zone average of 13.9%. With an estimated area of 791.26 square kilometers, Abay Chomen has an estimated population density of 63.9 people per square kilometer, which is less than the Zone average of 81.4.

The 1994 national census reported a total population for this woreda of 33,303, of whom 16,727 were men and 16,576 women; 11,600 or 34.83% of its population were urban dwellers. The two largest ethnic groups reported in Abay Chomen were the Oromo (86.79%) and the Amhara (11.5%); all other ethnic groups comprise 7.2% of the population. Oromiffa was spoken as a first language by 86.39%, and 12.82% spoke Amharic; the remaining 0.79% spoke all other primary languages reported. The plurality of the inhabitants practiced traditional beliefs, with 46.04% of the population reporting they observed them, while 40.33% of the population said they were Ethiopian Orthodox Christianity, 10.8% were Protestant, and 2.02% were Moslem.
