= Kalamkari =

Type of printed cotton textile

- Geographical indication
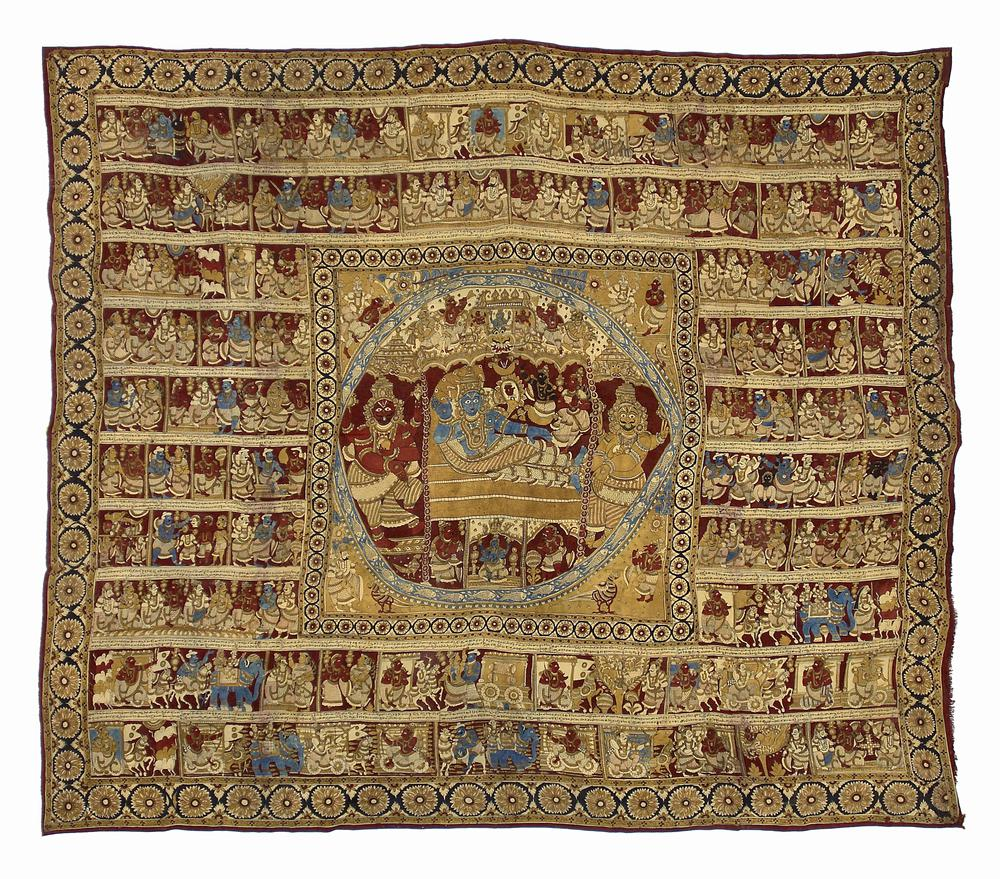
- Kalamkari painting of Lord Vishnu lying on the serpent Ananta, displayed at the British Museum.
- Alternative names: Vraata Pani
- Description: Kalamkari is an ancient traditional textile art
- Area: Srikalahasti, Andhra Pradesh; Machilipatnam, Andhra Pradesh
- Country: India
- Registered: Srikalahasti Kalamkari: April 2005; Machilipatnam Kalamkari: April 2008
- Material: Cotton fabric, bamboo pen, wooden blocks, natural dyes
- Official website: ipindia.gov.in

Kalamkari, also commonly spelled as qalamkari, is an ancient textile printing art, that originated in the Indian state of Andhra Pradesh. Kalamkari gained popularity in the South India during the reign of Vijayanagara Empire. Kalam implies 'pen' and Kari means 'art', a name given by the Mughals when they discovered the art during their reign over the Deccan region. Before that, it was known as Pattachitra. Only natural dyes are used in Kalamkari, which involves twenty-three steps.

There are two main styles of Kalamkari in India. The hand painted style that is largely practised in the town of Srikalahasti and block printed that is practised in the town of Machilipatnam, both located in Andhra Pradesh. Both styles are registered as Geographical Indications from Andhra Pradesh under handicraft goods, with the Srikalahasti style registered in 2005 and the Machilipatnam style in 2008, under the Geographical Indications of Goods (Registration and Protection) Act, 1999.

Srikalahasti style of Kalamkari, where the "kalam" or pen is used for freehand drawing of the subject and filling in the colours, is entirely hand worked. It is produced in Srikalahasti of Tirupati district of Andhra Pradesh. This style flourished in temples centred on creating unique religious identities, appearing on scrolls, temple hangings, chariot banners as well as depictions of deities and scenes taken from the Hindu epics (e.g. Ramayana, Mahabharata and Purana). Machilipatnam style of Kalamkari or Pedana Kalamkari work involves vegetable dyed block-painting of a fabric. It is produced at the town of Machilipatnam in Krishna district of Andhra Pradesh.

== Etymology ==
Kalamkari used to be termed as Pattachitra, the term "Pattachitra" (Sanskrit: पट्टचित्र) translates to "patta", meaning "cloth", with "chitra" meaning "picture". Paintings made on fabric and fabric scrolls are mentioned in ancient Hindu, Buddhist and Jain literature. It was originally referred to as “Vraata Pani” (‘Vraata’ meaning writing and ‘pani’ meaning work) in the native Telugu language.

When Southern India was under medieval Islamic rule, the term Kalamkari was derived from the Persian words kalam, which means "pen", and kari, which means "craftsmanship". This term became popular under the patronage of the Golconda sultanate.

== History ==
Kalamkari is an ancient textile printing art form that evolved about 3000 years ago in the state of Andhra Pradesh. The discovery of a resist dyed piece of cloth on a silver vase at the ancient site of Harappa (c. 2600 BC) of the Bronze Age Indus Valley Civilisation confirms that the tradition of Pattachitra is very ancient.

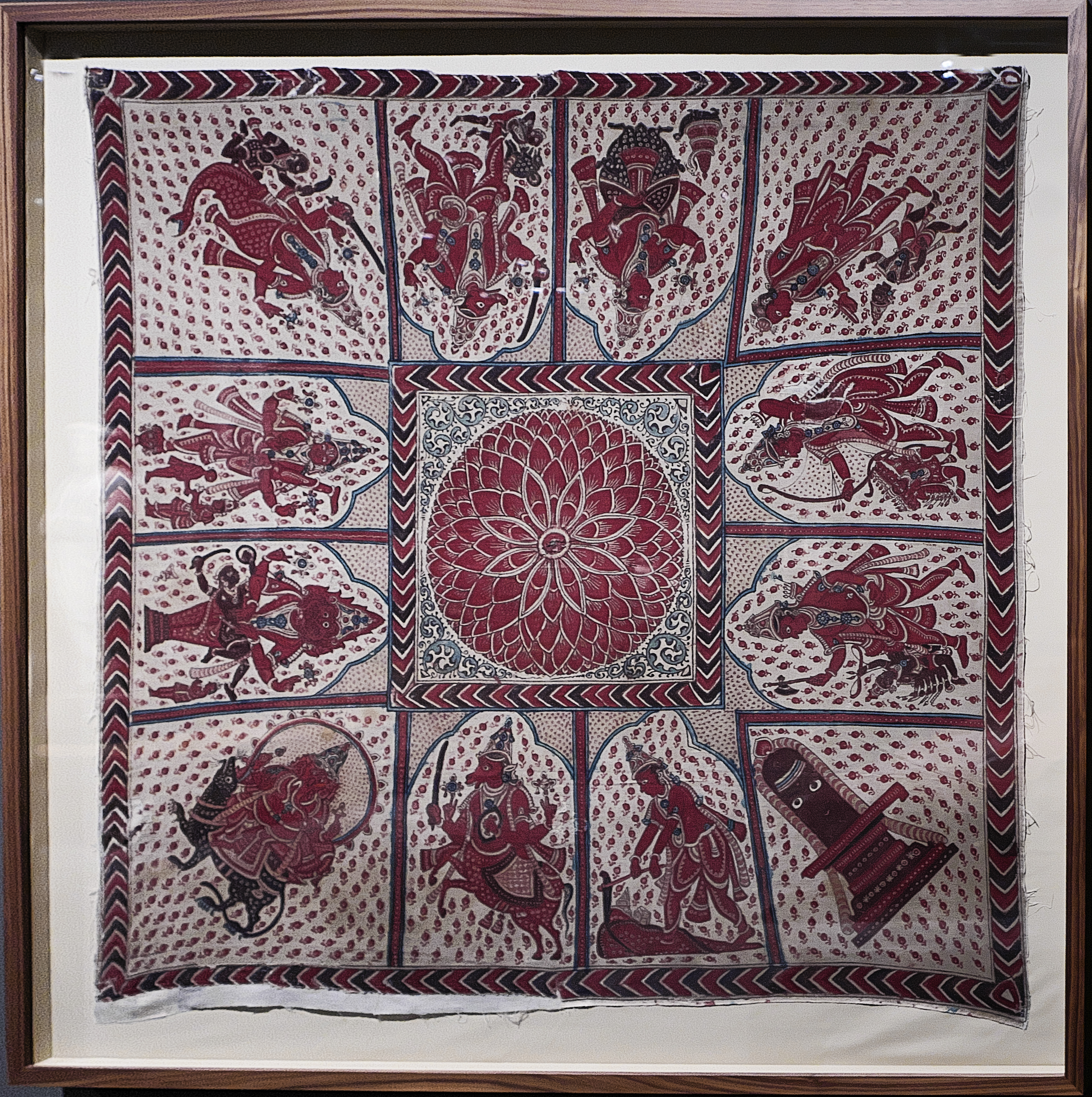
Kalamkari textile depicting Lord Vishnu's dashavtaras as well as Ganesha and a Śiva lingam, at British Museum.

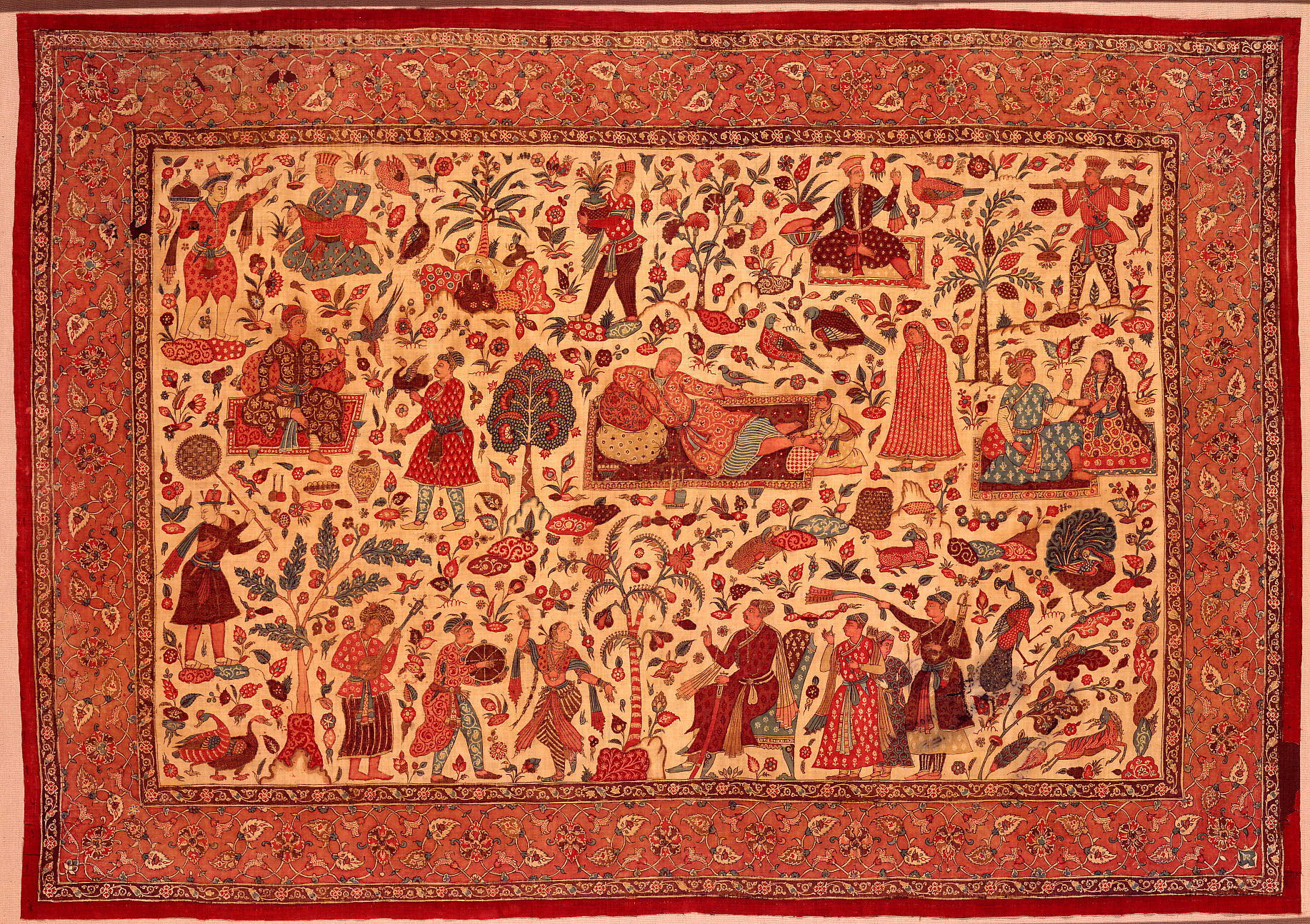
Kalamkari Rumal at Metropolitan Museum of Art

According to some sources, the oldest piece of Kalamkari fabric is from the 4th century BC in the tomb of the Scythes Seven Brothers of Lazia; which featured a vine pattern on the edge, which recalls the mixed Persian and Greek design traditions.

Kalamkari style of architecture originated in machilipatnam. Musicians and painters, known as chitrakars, moved from village to tell the village dwellers the stories of Hindu mythology. They illustrated their accounts using large bolts of canvas painted on the spot with simple means and dyes extracted from plants. Similarly, the ones found in Hindu temples are large panels of Kalamkari depicting the episodes of Hindu mythology and iconography, similar to Buddhist Thangka paintings.

The Mughals who patronised this craft in the Coromandel and Golconda province called the practitioners of this craft "Qualamkars", from which the term "Kalamkari" evolved. The Pedana Kalamkari craft made in Pedana nearby Machilipatnam in Krishna district, Andhra Pradesh, evolved under the patronage of the Mughals and the Golconda sultanate. Owing to the said patronage, this school was influenced by Persian art under Islamic rule.

== Styles ==
Srikalahasti Kalamkari

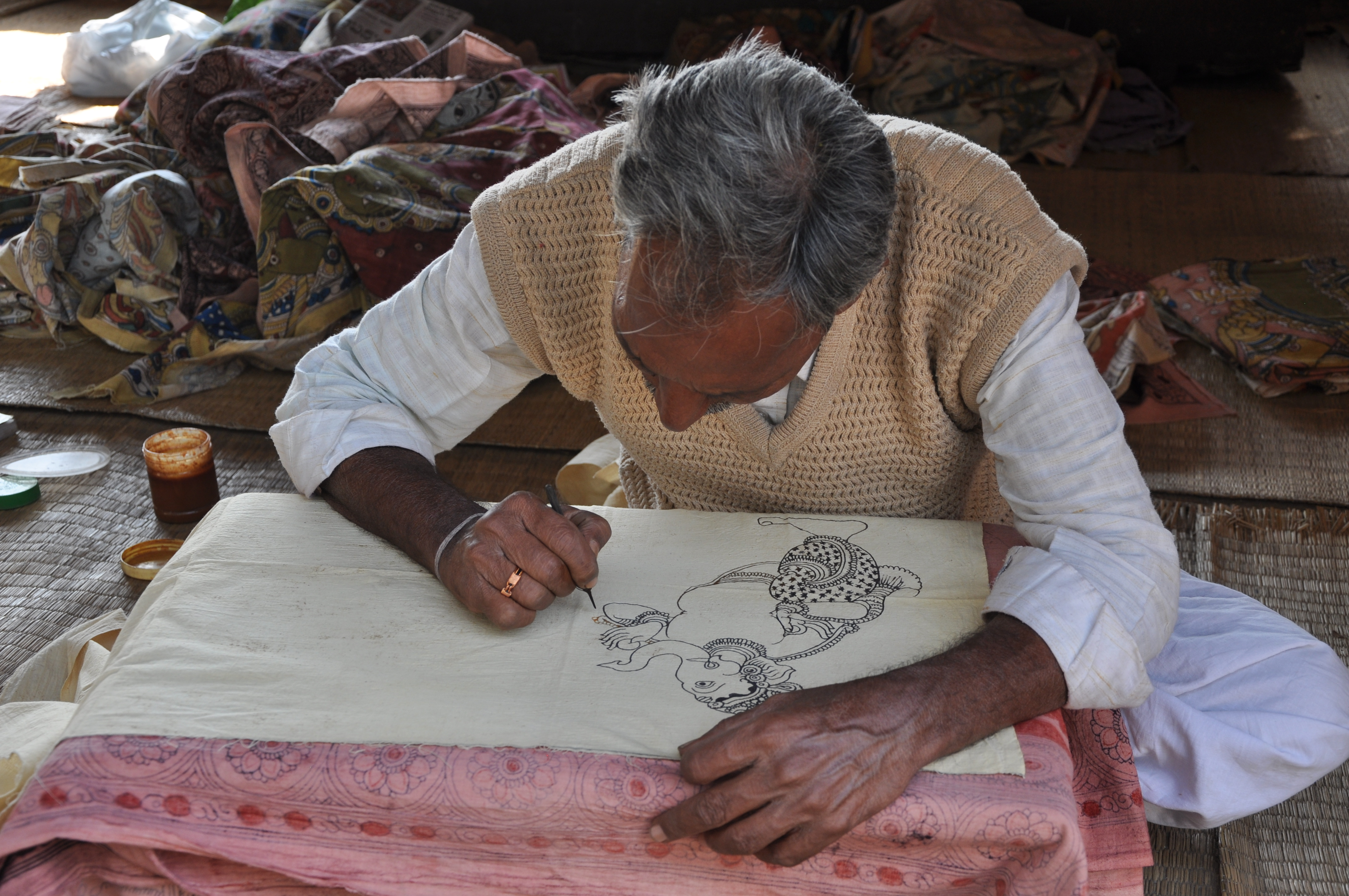
Kalamkari artisan painting in Srikalahasti style.

The Kalahasti style is produced in Srikalahasti of Tirupati district. A "kalam" or pen is used for freehand drawing of the subject and filling in the colours and is entirely hand worked. This style flourished in temples centred on creating unique religious identities, appearing on scrolls, temple hangings, chariot banners as well as depictions of deities and scenes taken from the Hindu epics. As a result, it has a distinct religious identity and thrives on mythological themes. The attractive blend of colours on the fabrics usually portrays characters from the Indian mythology, with the divinity figures of Brahma, Saraswati, Ganesh, Durga, Shiva and Parvati as the main source of inspiration. The Kalahasti artists generally depict on the cloth the deities, scenes from the epic Ramayana, the Mahabharata, Puranas and other mythological classics mainly producing scrolls, temple backcloths, wall hangings, chariot banners and the like.

In ancient times, the common man learned of gods and goddesses, and of their mythical character from these paintings. Groups of singers, musicians and painters, called chitrakattis, moved from village to village narrating the great stories of the Hindu mythology. Progressively, during the course of history, they illustrated their accounts using large bolts of canvas painted on the spot with rudimentary means and dyes extracted from plants. Thus, it is believed, was born the first Kalamkari. It was registered as one of the geographical indication from Andhra Pradesh, under handicraft goods by Geographical Indications of Goods (Registration and Protection) Act, 1999. The style owes its present status to Kamaladevi Chattopadhyay who popularised the art as the first chairperson of the All India Handicrafts Board.

Machilipatnam Kalamkari (Pedana Kalamkari)

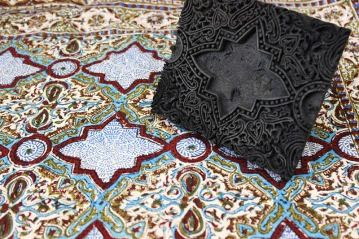
Block used for Machilipatnam style.

Pedana is a small town just 13 km from Machilipatnam. The Machilipatnam paintings, on the other hand are Persian in character because of the patronage and proximity to the Mughals and the Golconda Sultanate. Hence they were forbidden to use religious motifs of Hinduism. The traditional block prints in this art largely use Persian motifs like interlacing pattern of leaves and flowers, the cartwheel, different forms of the lotus flower, creepers, birds like parrots and peacock, and other intricate leaf designs. One very popular subject with them is the tree of life. Their chief production is in the field of table and bed linen, curtain lengths, dress material, scarves, file and bag covers, cushion covers and wall hangings. With the advent of the Mughal Empire, after Aurangzeb conquered the region in 1687, a new style emerged in Machilipatnam work which represented personal portraits of the emperors along with panels depicting sagas of their rule and daily life, and the richness of their courts. It was registered as one of the geographical indication from Andhra Pradesh, under handicraft goods by Geographical Indications of Goods (Registration and Protection) Act, 1999.

== Middle forms ==
In the Middle Ages, the term was also used to refer to the making of any cotton fabric patterned through the medium of vegetable dyes by free-hand and block-printing, produced in many regions of India. In places where the fabric is block printed, the kalam (pen) is used to draw finer details and for application of some colours.

== Technique ==
The first step in creating Kalamkari is steeping it in astringents and buffalo milk and then drying it under the sun. Afterwards, the red, black, brown, and violet portions of the designs are outlined with a mordant and cloth are then placed in a bath of alizarin. The next step is to cover the cloth, except for the parts to be dyed blue, in wax, and immerse the cloth in indigo dye. The wax is then scraped off and the remaining areas are painted by hand, similar to Indonesian batik.

To create design contours, artists use a bamboo or date palm stick pointed at one end with a bundle of fine hair attached to this pointed end to serve as the brush or pen. This pen is soaked in a mixture of jaggery and water; one by one these are applied, then the vegetable dyes are added.

In Isfahan, Iran, the fabric is printed using patterned wooden stamps or metal stamps.

== Colour fixing ==
Dyes for the cloth are obtained by extracting colours from various roots, leaves, and mineral salts of iron, tin, copper, and alum. Various effects are obtained by using cow dung, seeds, plants and crushed flowers to obtain natural dye. Along with buffalo milk, myrobalan is used in kalamkari. Myrobalan is also used to remove the odd smell of buffalo milk. The fixing agents available in the myrobalan can easily fix the dye or colour of the textile while treating the fabric. Alum is used in making natural dyes and also while treating the fabric. Alum ensures the stability of the colour in Kalamkari fabric.

== Themes ==
Kalamkari specifically depicts epics such as the Ramayana or Mahabharata. However, there are recent applications of the Kalamkari technique to depict Buddha and Buddhist art forms. In recent times, many aesthetically good figures such as musical instruments, small animals, flowers, Buddha and few Hindu symbols, like swastika are also introduced to Kalamkari.

== Modern day ==
Contemporary kalamkari techniques show various departures from the past. In Masulipatnam, mordant is now uniformly printed with a block. Indigo dyeing has been given up and the application of the wax resist by kalam has also disappeared. The mordant for outlining in black remains unchanged, but iron acetate has replaced indigo for dyeing the larger areas black, despite its known corrosive qualities. Yellow dyes are made from dried flowers called aldekai (Telugu) or kadukai (Tamil) of the myrobalam, Terminalia chebula.

Nowadays, in India, silk, mulmul, cotton, and synthetic saris are also sold with Kalamkari print. Printing is a much easier task than traditional Kalamkari work. Kalamkari dupattas and blouse pieces are popular among Indian women.

== See also ==
- Palampore – bedcovers and wall hangings made using the kalamkari technique
- Mangalagiri Handicraft
