= Guduru (woreda) =

District in Oromia Region, Ethiopia

Coordinates: 9°30′N 37°35′E

Guduru (also transliterated Gudru or Goodroo) is a woreda in Oromia Region, Ethiopia. This woreda is named after one of the sections of the Macha Oromo, also known as the Torban Guduru ("the seven houses of Guduru"), which coalesced into a kingdom around 1855 under Gama Moras, which lay between the Abay River and the Gibe region. It was also the location of the Battle of Embabo, fought 6 June 1882; the Shewan forces of Menelik defeated the Gojjame army, capturing Negus Tekle Haymanot and establishing a Shewan hegemony over the territories south of the Abay.

Part of the Horo Gudru Welega Zone, Guduru is bordered on the south by Jimma Rare, on the southwest by Jimma Horo, on the west by Lake Finicha'a, on the northwest by Abay Chomen, on the north by the Abay River which separates it from the Amhara Region, and on the east by the Guder River which separates it from the Mirab Shewa Zone. The administrative center is Guduru. Hababo Guduru woreda was separated from Guduru.

== Overview ==
The highest point in this woreda is Mount Habib (2430 meters). Rivers within the woreda include the Abune, Boye, Asendabo, Gebete, Korke, Kersa, Embabo and Dede Wata. A survey of the land in this woreda shows that 53.8% is arable or cultivable, 15.3% pasture, 14.3% forest, and the remaining 26.6% is considered marshy, mountainous or otherwise unusable. Cash crops include niger seed and rape seed.

Industry in the woreda includes 27 grain mills and 3 edible oil mills; there is evidence that construction materials like gravel are also extracted in this woreda. There were 36 Farmers Associations with 14,036 members and 15 Service Cooperatives with 12,898 members. Guduru has 30 kilometers of dry weather road and 30 kilometers of all-weather, for an average of road density of 25.03 kilometers per 1000 square kilometers. About 12.6% of the total population has access to drinking water.

== Demographics ==
The 2007 national census reported a total population for this woreda of 98,084, of whom 48,848 were men and 49,236 were women; 6,504 or 6.63% of its population were urban dwellers. The majority of the inhabitants were Protestants, with 75.32% reporting that as their religion, while 19.32% observed Ethiopian Orthodox Christianity, and 4% observed traditional beliefs.

Based on figures published by the Central Statistical Agency in 2005, this woreda has an estimated total population of 151,638, of whom 76,905 are men and 74,733 are women; 7,249 or 4.78% of its population are urban dwellers, which is less than the Zone average of 13.9%. With an estimated area of 2,397.50 square kilometers, Guduru has an estimated population density of 63.2 people per square kilometer, which is less than the Zone average of 81.4.

The 1994 national census reported a total population for this woreda of 109,148, of whom 54,085 were men and 55,061 women; 4,059 or 3.72% of its population were urban dwellers at the time. The two largest ethnic groups reported in Guduru were the Oromo (96.17%), and the Amhara (3.71%); all other ethnic groups made up 0.12% of the population. Oromiffa was spoken as a first language by 97.96%, and 2.01% spoke Amharic; the remaining 0.3% spoke all other primary languages reported. The majority of the inhabitants practiced traditional beliefs, with 72.61% of the population reporting they observed them, while 18.35% of the population said they were Ethiopian Orthodox Christianity, and 8.1% were Protestant.
