= Urivi =

- Village
- Interactive map of Urivi
- Location in Andhra Pradesh, India
- Coordinates: 16°22′13″N 81°11′00″E
- Country: India
- State: Andhra Pradesh
- District: Krishna

Languages
  - Official: Telugu
- Time zone: UTC+5:30 (IST)
- Pincode: 521329
- Vehicle registration: AP16

Urivi is a village in Pedana mandal, Krishna District, Andhra Pradesh, India.

== Demographics ==
Telugu is the local language. Total population of Urivi is 1,937. Males are 984 and Females are 953; living in 485 Houses. Total area of Urivi is 1,015 hectares.
