= Horo (Aanaa) =

Horo ሰከላ
- Woreda
- Flag
- Interactive map of Horo
- Coordinates: 9°38′N 37°05′E
- Zone: Mirab Gojjam
- Region: Oromiya

Population (2007 est.)
  - Total: 138,691

Horo is one of the woredas (districts) in the Oromia of Ethiopia. It was part of former Jimma Horo woreda. It is part of the Horo Gudru Welega Zone. The administrative center is Sekela.

== Demographics ==
The 2007 national census reported a total population for this of 74,989 woreda, of whom 37,302 were men and 37,687 were women; 3,669 or 4.89% of its population were urban dwellers. The majority of the inhabitants observed Ethiopian Orthodox Christianity, with 37.36% reporting that as their religion, while 30.67% were Protestants, 23.98% observed traditional beliefs, 5.57% were Moslem, and 1.6% observed Roman Catholicism.
