= Pedana =

- Town
- Location in Andhra Pradesh, India
- Coordinates: 16.2667°N 81.1667°E
- Country: India
- State: Andhra Pradesh
- District: Krishna
- Mandal: Pedana

Government
  - Type: Municipal Council
  - Chairman: Balla Jyosthna Rani (Janasena Party)

Area
  - Total: 20.72 km^{2} (8.00 sq mi)
- Elevation: 0 m (0 ft)

Population (2011)
  - Total: 30,721
  - Density: 1,483/km^{2} (3,840/sq mi)
- Time zone: UTC+5:30 (IST)
- PIN: 521 366
- Vehicle registration: AP 16

Pedana is a municipality and the headquarters of Pedana mandal under Machilipatnam revenue division of Krishna district of the Indian state of Andhra Pradesh. It is located at a distance of 8 km (5.0 mi) from the district headquarters, Machilipatnam.

== Geography ==
Pedana is located at 16.2667°N 81.1667°E. It has an average elevation of 0.5 metres (3 feet).

== Demographics ==
As of the 2011 Census of India, Pedana Municipality had a total population of 30,721, comprising 15,417 males and 15,304 females, giving it a sex ratio of 993 females per 1,000 males. The total child population (aged 0–6) was 3,037, constituting approximately 9.9% of the municipal population.The literacy rate of Pedana town stood at 70.6%, which was higher than the state average of Andhra Pradesh (67.35%). Male literacy was approximately 75.8%, while female literacy stood at 65.4%.Telugu is the official and predominant spoken language in Pedana town.Hinduism is the majority religion in Pedana, followed by significant Muslim and Christian minority communities. Scheduled Castes (SC) and Scheduled Tribes (ST) account for roughly 11% and 1.3% of the broader mandal's demographic makeup, respectively.

== Governance ==
Civic administration

Pedana municipality was formed in the year 1985. It is a III–Grade Municipality with 23 wards and spread over an area of 20.72 km^{2} (8.00 mi^{2}). The current chairman is Balla Jyosthna Rani.

== Transport ==
The town is well connected to many towns and cities by means of rail and road transport. The town has a total road length of 76.12 km (47.30 mi). NH 216 passes through the town which connects Digamarru and Ongole. Pedana railway station is classified as a D–category stations in the Vijayawada railway division of South Coast Railway zone.

== Economy ==
Handloom weaving is one of the town's main occupations. The Kalamkari technique is used, a type of block printing using natural dyes onto cotton and Silk Fabric/Saree. The craft received Geographical Indication (GI) status under the Geographical Indications of Goods (Registration and Protection) Act, 1999. A significant section of the local workforce is involved in block carving, dye preparation, printing, and fabric washing. However, local artisans face economic pressure from power-loom imitations and machine-printed synthetic substitutes.Situated in the fertile Krishna River delta, the broader economy of Pedana Mandal relies heavily on agriculture. Paddy (rice) is the primary crop cultivated in the surrounding rural hinterland, along with coconut plantations and commercial aquaculture (prawn and fish farming). The town serves as a local commercial market for agricultural produce and operates an Agricultural Produce Market Committee (APMC) yard for wholesale crop trading. Agro-processing facilities such as rice mills and small-scale cold storage units also support the regional farm trade.

== Education ==
The primary and secondary school education is imparted by government, aided and private schools, under the School Education Department of the state. The medium of instruction followed by different schools are English, Telugu

== See also ==
- List of municipalities in Andhra Pradesh
