= Guduru, Krishna district =

Guduru
- Village
- Interactive map of Guduru
- Location in Andhra Pradesh, India
- Coordinates: 16°13′06″N 81°04′57″E
- Country: India
- State: Andhra Pradesh
- District: Krishna
- Mandal: Guduru

Area
  - Total: 10.63 km^{2} (4.10 sq mi)

Population (2011)
  - Total: 6,786
  - Density: 638.4/km^{2} (1,653/sq mi)

Languages
  - Official: Telugu
- Time zone: UTC+5:30 (IST)
- Literacy: 59.69%

Guduru is a village in Guduru Mandal in Krishna district of the Indian state of Andhra Pradesh. It is a Guduru Mandal headquarter, located 7 km towards west from District headquarters Machilipatnam. Guduru Pin code is 521149 and postal head office is Guduru S.O

Machilipatnam, Pedana, Gudivada, Repalle are the nearby Cities to Guduru.

== See also ==
- Villages in Guduru mandal
