= Horo Guduru Welega Zone =

Zone in Oromia Region of Ethiopia

Map of the regions and zones of Ethiopia

Horo Guduru Welega (Oromo: Wallaggaa Horroo Guduruu) is a zone in Oromia Region of Ethiopia. It is named after the former province of Welega, whose eastern part lay in the area Horo Guduru Welega now occupies. Horo Guduru Welega was formed of woredas, including East Welega Zone. Horo Guduru is bordered on the east by West Shewa Zone, on the west by East Welega Zone, and on the north by Amhara Region.

The seat of the zonal administration cabinet is in Shambu town. Shambu is a seat for Horro Woreda and Shambu town woreda in addition to the zonal service.

In this zone, various community associations are working on supporting elderly, children, and youths suffering financially and lacking family support. One such association is Oda Buluq Integrated Development Association (OBIDA), registered in the Federal Democratic Republic of Ethiopia.

== Demographics ==
Based on the 2007 Census conducted by the Central Statistical Agency of Ethiopia (CSA), this zone has a total population of 570,040, of whom 285,515 are men and 284,525 are women. 64,739, or 11.36% of the population, are urban inhabitants. A total of 117,241 households were counted in this zone, which resulted in an average of 4.86 persons to a household and 112,403 housing units.

The two largest ethnic groups reported in Horo Gudru Welega were the Oromo (93.12%) and the Amhara (6.34%); all other ethnic groups made up 0.54% of the population. Oromo was spoken as a first language by 93.12%, and 6.34% spoke Amharic; the remaining 0.54% spoke all other primary languages reported. The majority of the inhabitants were Protestants, with 42.99% of the population having reported they practiced that belief, while 38.47% of the population professed Ethiopian Orthodox Christianity, 8.91% observed Waaqeffataa [traditional beliefs] and 8.61% of the population were Muslim.
