= Addis Ababa =

Capital and largest city of Ethiopia

Addis Ababa አዲስ አበባ (Amharic) Finfinnee (Oromo)
- Capital and chartered city
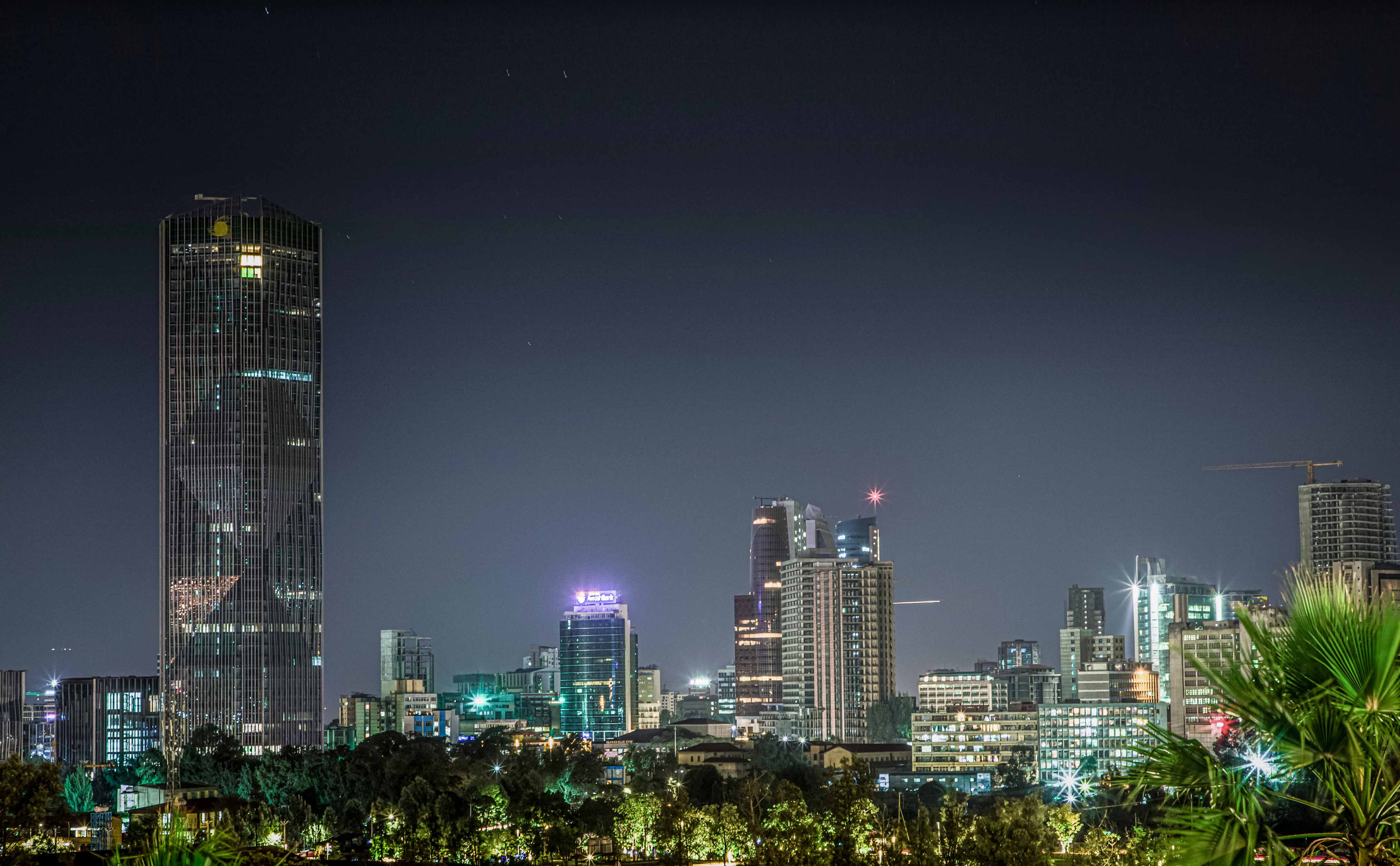
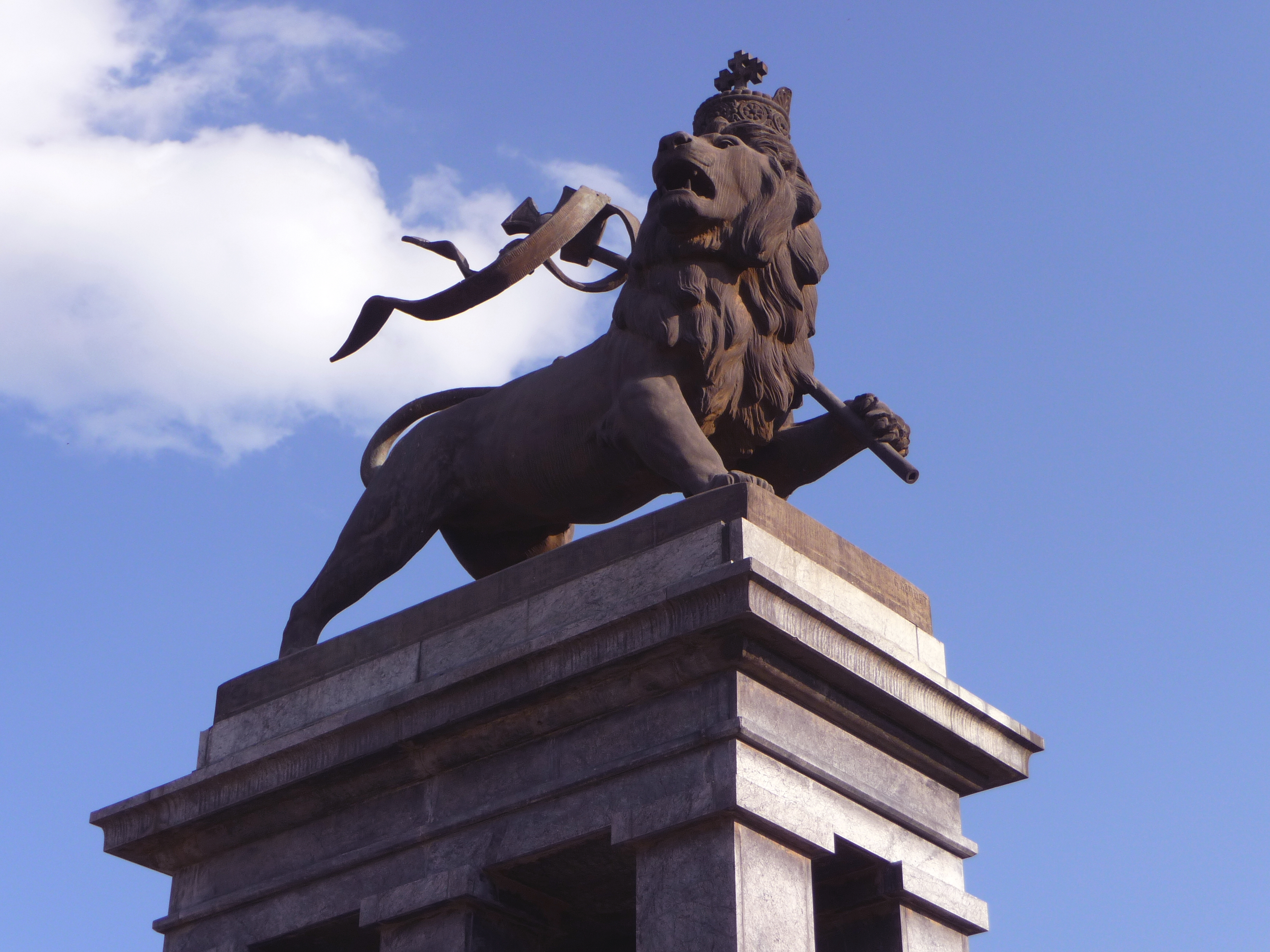
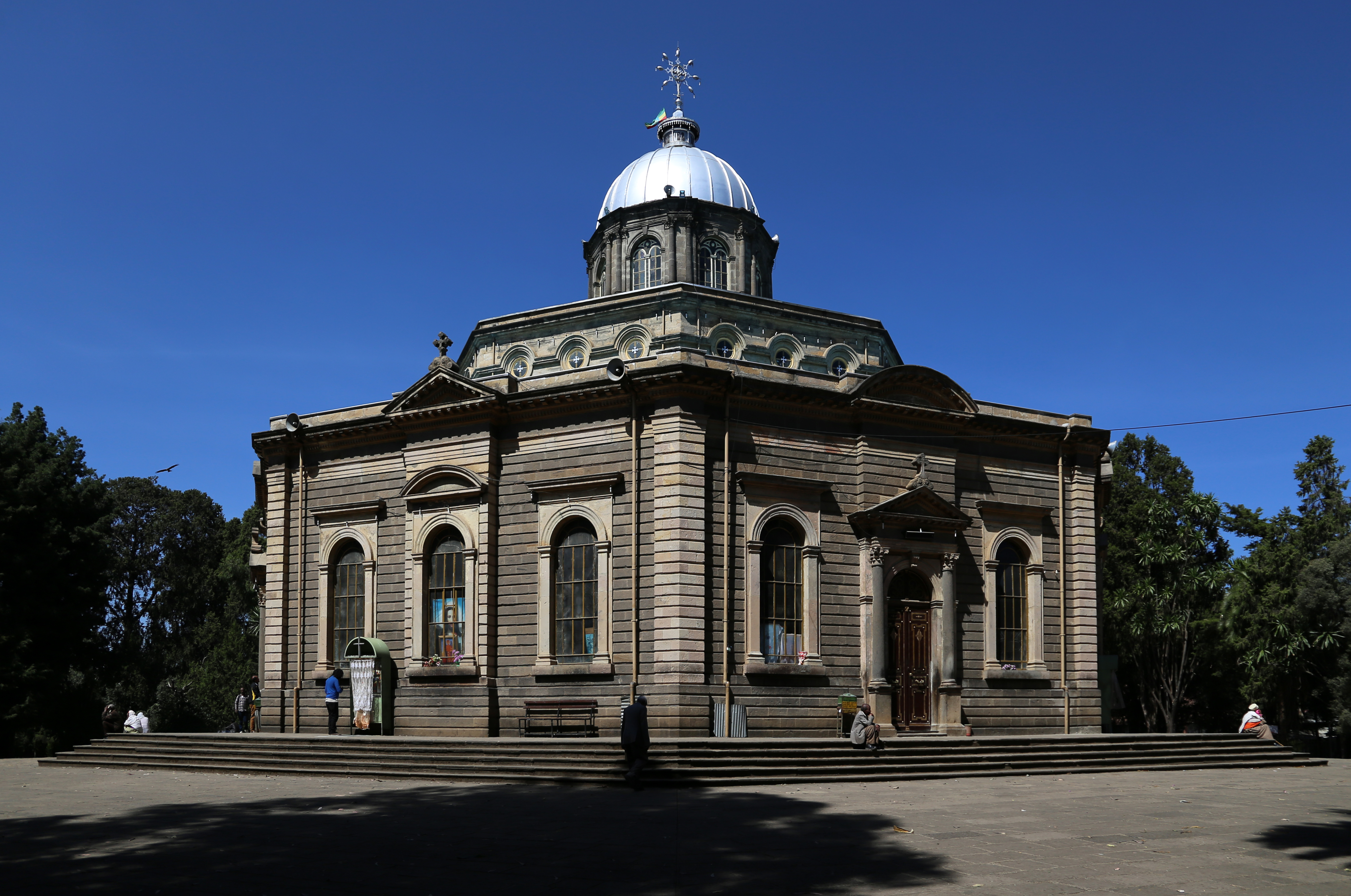
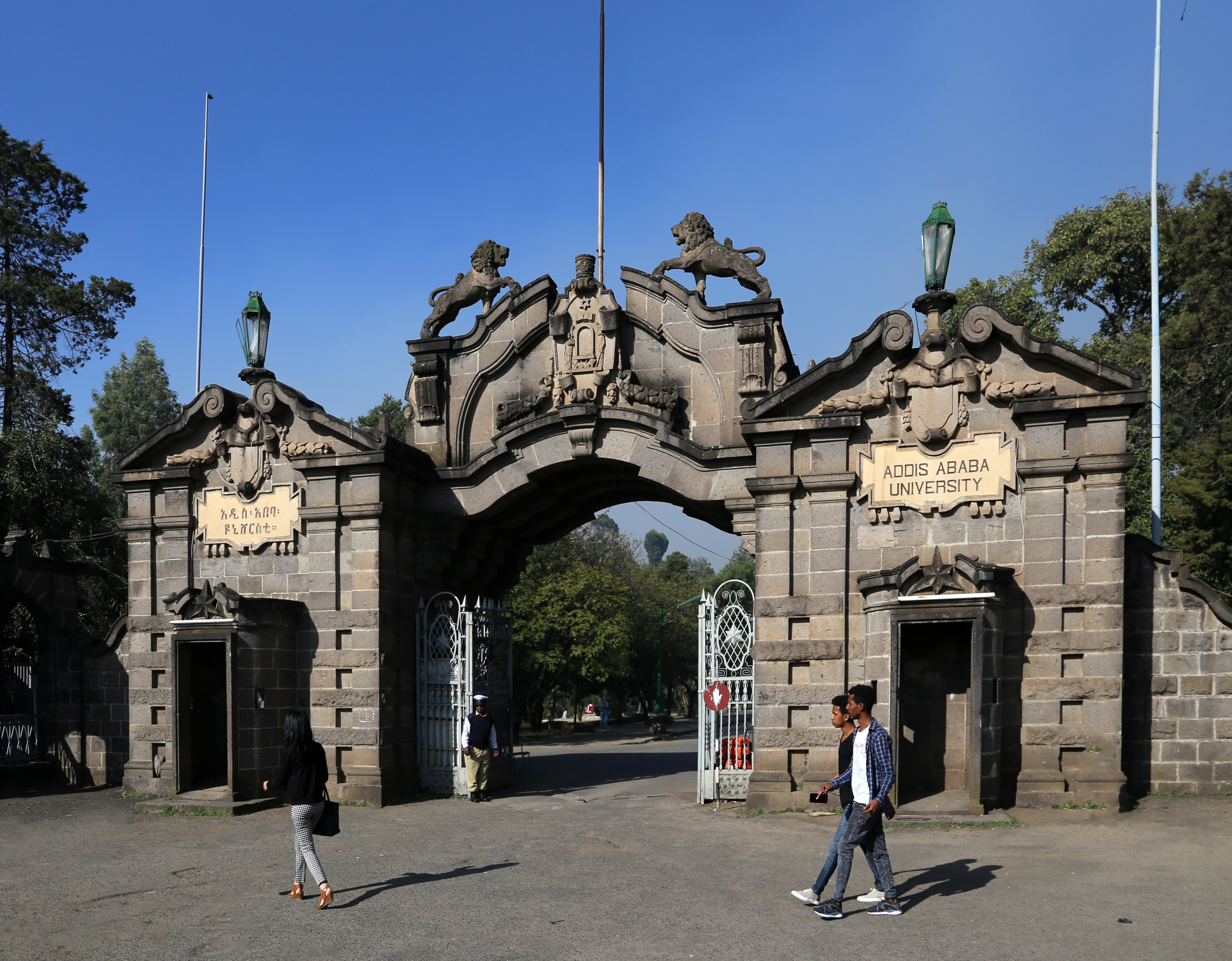
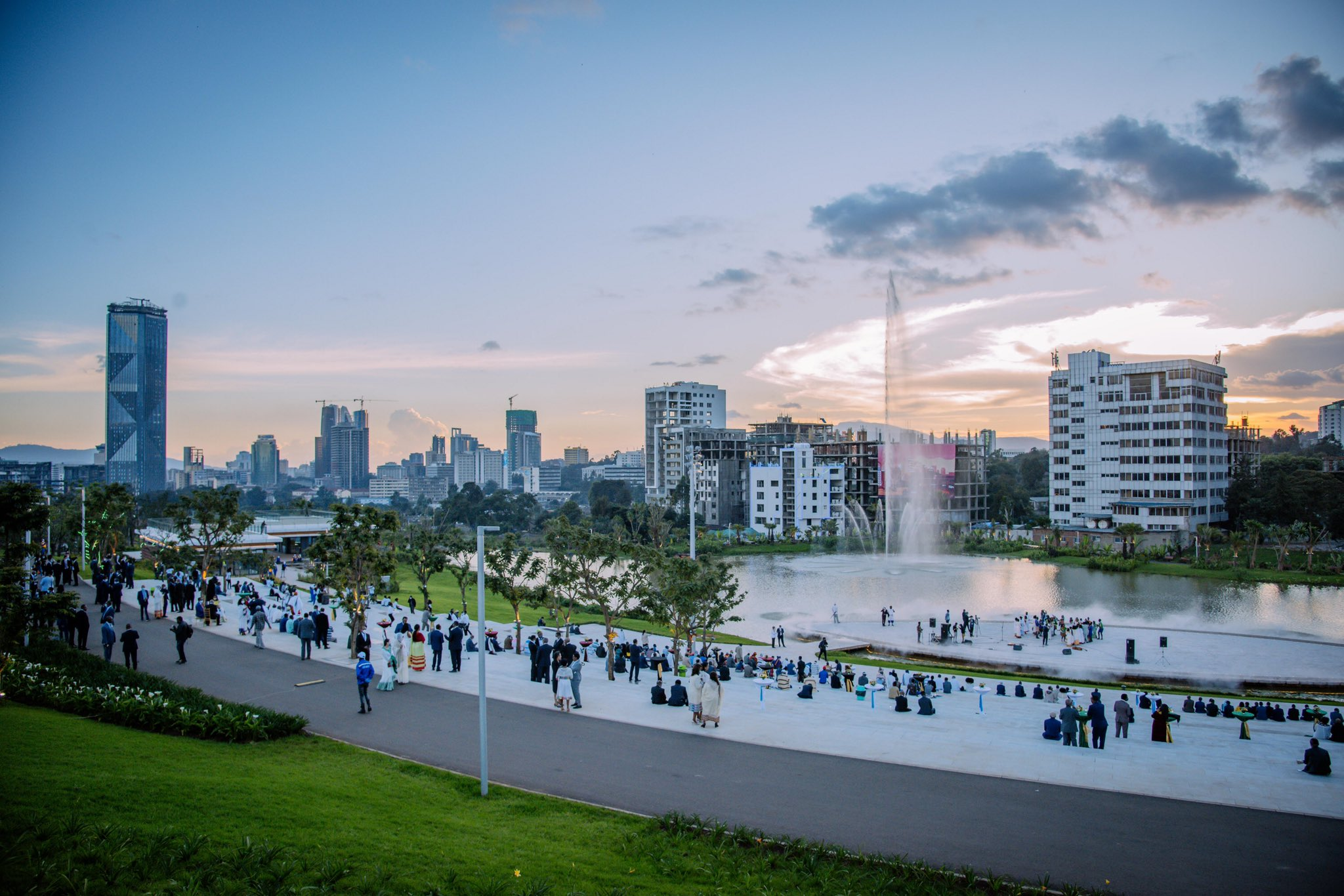
- Skyline of Addis Ababa's Meskel Square Monument to the Lion of Judah St. George's Cathedral Addis Ababa University Sheger Park

- Flag
- Nicknames: Barara, Adu Genet
- Addis Ababa highlighted inside of Ethiopia

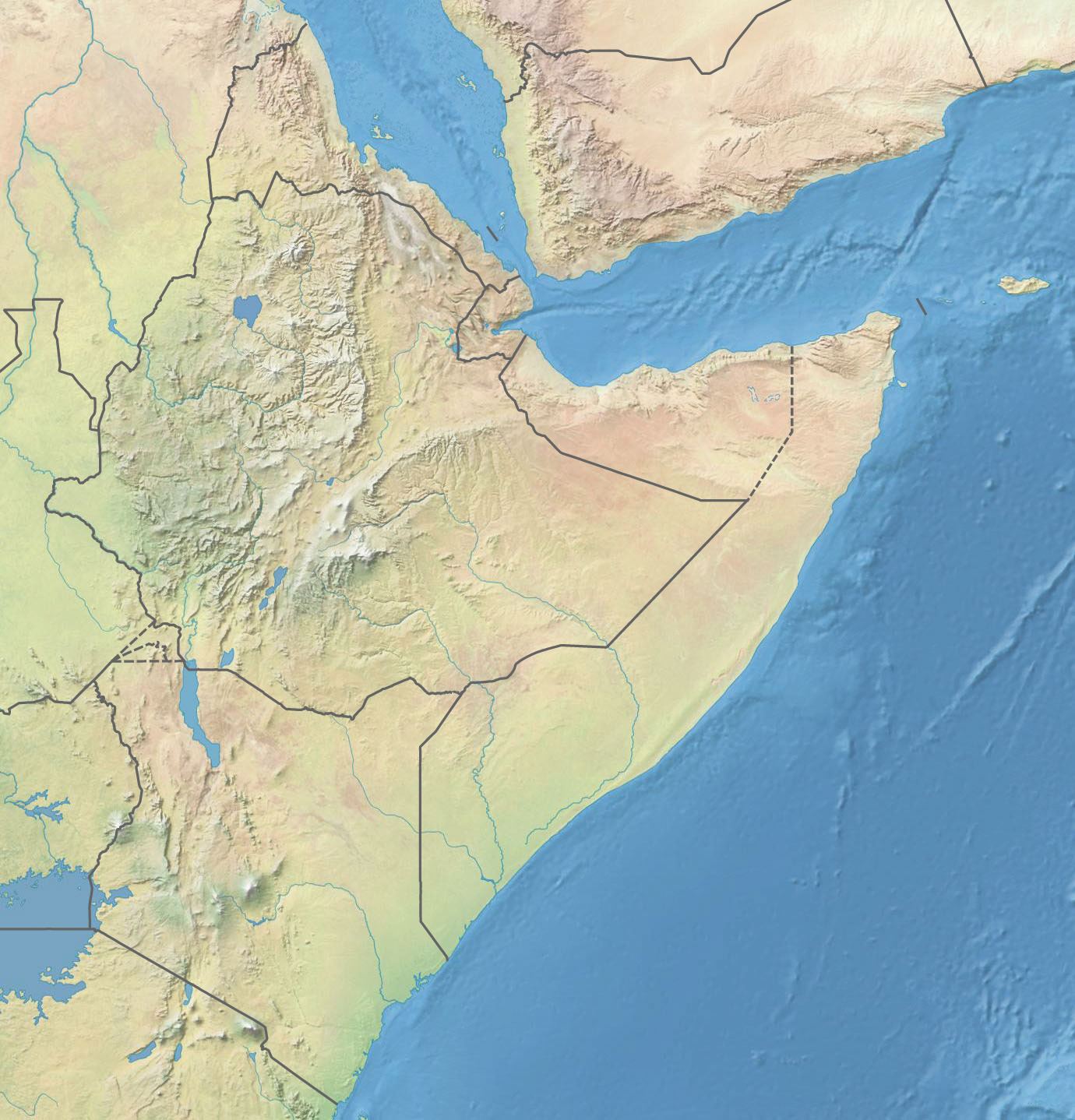
- Location within Ethiopia Location within Africa Addis Ababa (Africa)
- Coordinates: 9°2′9″N 38°45′9″E
- Country: Ethiopia
- Founded: 1886
- Incorporated: 1889
- Founder: Menelik II; Taytu Betul

Government
  - Body: Addis Ababa City Administration
  - Mayor: Adanech Abebe

Area
  - Land: 527 km^{2} (203 sq mi)
  - Metro: 810 km^{2} (310 sq mi)
- Elevation: 2,355 m (7,726 ft)

Population (2025)
  - Capital and chartered city: 6,287,000
  - Rank: 1st in Ethiopia; 10th in Africa
  - Density: 11,900/km^{2} (30,900/sq mi)
  - Metro (2025): 5,956,680
- Demonym(s): Addis Ababan, Addis Ababian
- Time zone: UTC+03:00 (EAT)
- Area code: (+251) 11
- HDI (2023): 0.717 high · 1st of 11
- Website: cityaddisababa.gov.et

Addis Ababa (/ˌædɪs ˈæbəbə/ AD-iss AB-ə-bə; Amharic: አዲስ አበባ [adˈdis ˈaβəβa], lit. 'new flower'; Oromo: Finfinnee, lit. 'fountain of hot mineral water') is the capital and largest city of Ethiopia. With an estimated population of 6,287,000 inhabitants as of 2025, it is the tenth largest city in Africa. At an elevation of 2,355 metres (7,726 ft), it is the fourth-highest capital city in the world and the highest capital in Africa. Addis Ababa is a highly developed and important cultural, artistic, financial and administrative center of Ethiopia.

The founding history of Addis Ababa dates back to the late 19th century by Menelik II, Negus of Shewa, in 1886 after finding Mount Entoto unpleasant two years prior. At the time, the city was a resort town; its large mineral spring abundance attracted nobilities of the empire and led them to establish permanent settlement. It also attracted many members of the working classes – including artisans and merchants – and foreign visitors. Menelik II then formed his imperial palace in 1887. Addis Ababa became the empire's capital in 1889, and subsequently international embassies were opened. Urban development began with the 20th century, without any prior planning.

Addis Ababa saw a wide-scale economic boom in 1926 and 1927, and an increase in the number of buildings owned by the middle class, including stone houses filled with imported European furniture. The middle class also imported newly manufactured automobiles and expanded banking institutions. During the Italian occupation, urbanization and modernization steadily increased through a masterplan; it was hoped Addis Ababa would be a more "colonial" city, and this continued after the occupation. Subsequent master plans were designed by French and British consultants from the 1940s onwards, focusing on monuments, civic structures, satellite cities and the inner-city. Similarly, the later Italo-Ethiopian masterplan (also projected in 1986) concerned only urban structures and accommodation services, but was later adapted for the 2003 masterplan.

Addis Ababa is a federally-chartered city in accordance with the Addis Ababa City Government Charter Proclamation No. 87/1997 in the FDRE Constitution. Called "the political capital of Africa" due to its historical, diplomatic, and political significance for the continent, Addis Ababa serves as the headquarters of major international organizations, such as the African Union and the United Nations Economic Commission for Africa.

The city lies a few kilometres west of the East African Rift, which splits Ethiopia into two, between the Nubian plate and the Somali plate. The city is surrounded by the Special Zone of Oromia, and is populated by people from different regions of Ethiopia. It is home to Addis Ababa University. The city has a high human development index, and is known for its vibrant culture, strong fashion scene, high civic and political involvement of younger people, a thriving arts scene, and for being the heart of a country with one of the fastest economic growth rates in the world.

== History ==
=== Prehistory ===
A study based on DNA evidence from almost 1,000 people around the world suggests that early humans first travelled out of Africa via a place close to Addis Ababa, spreading from the region to the rest of the planet some time around 100,000 years ago. The research indicated that genetic diversity decreases steadily the further one's ancestors travelled from Addis Ababa.

=== Middle Ages ===
Mount Entoto, a high tableland to the north of current Addis Ababa, is one of a handful of sites put forward as a possible location for a medieval imperial capital known as Barara. This permanent fortified city was established during the early to mid-15th century and it served as the main residence of several successive emperors up to the early 16th-century reign of Libne Dengel. The city was depicted standing between Mount Zuqualla and Menegasha on a map drawn by the Italian cartographer Fra Mauro in around 1450, and it was razed and plundered by Ahmad ibn Ibrahim while the imperial army was trapped on the south of the Awash River in 1529, an event witnessed and documented two years later by the Yemeni writer Arab-Faqih. The suggestion that Barara was located on Mount Entoto is supported by the very recent discovery of a large medieval town overlooking Addis Ababa located between rock-hewn Washa Mikael and the more modern church of Entoto Maryam, founded in the late 19th century. Dubbed the Pentagon, the 30-hectare site incorporates a castle with 12 towers, along with 520 meters of stone walls measuring up to 5-meter high. Described a "metropolis", Barara is estimated to have had a population exceeding 160,000 people, comparable to the largest European towns in 1500 CE, Paris and Naples.

=== Pre-foundation inhabitants ===
The area that became Addis Ababa was inhabited by the Gafat people in the centuries before the city's foundation. The Gafat spoke a South Ethio-Semitic language distinct from both Amharic and Oromo, and by the 16th century their territory ran along the left bank of the Abbay river from the Wäläqa river in northern Shewa southward to the headwaters of the Awash River. The region of Éndägäbtän, which covers the area around the Awash source, was their domain from at least the 14th century. The Gafat comprised numerous subgroups, among them the Abädray, Ašmän, Šat, and Wänge, but never developed shared political institutions across these groups, which enabled the Christian monarchs to deal with them separately. From the late 16th century, Oromo groups moving northward through the region drove the local Gafat population across the Abbay into Gojjam. Those who remained were absorbed into the Oromo population. The Éndägäbtän territory later became part of the Männagäsha Awrajja in the pre-1974 administrative system, lying west of present-day Addis Ababa.

=== Foundation ===
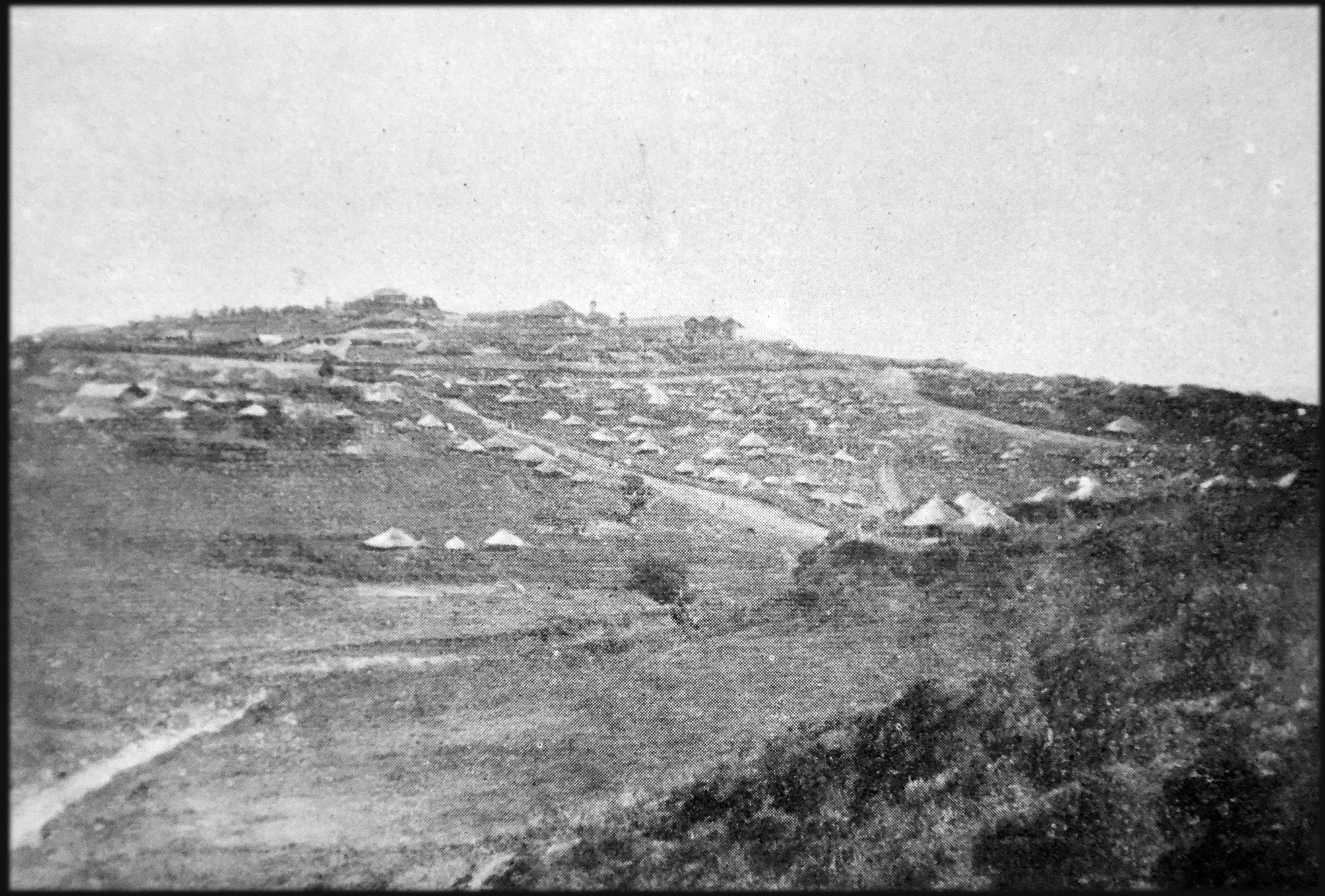
Distant view of Menelik Palace in 1900

==== Founding ====
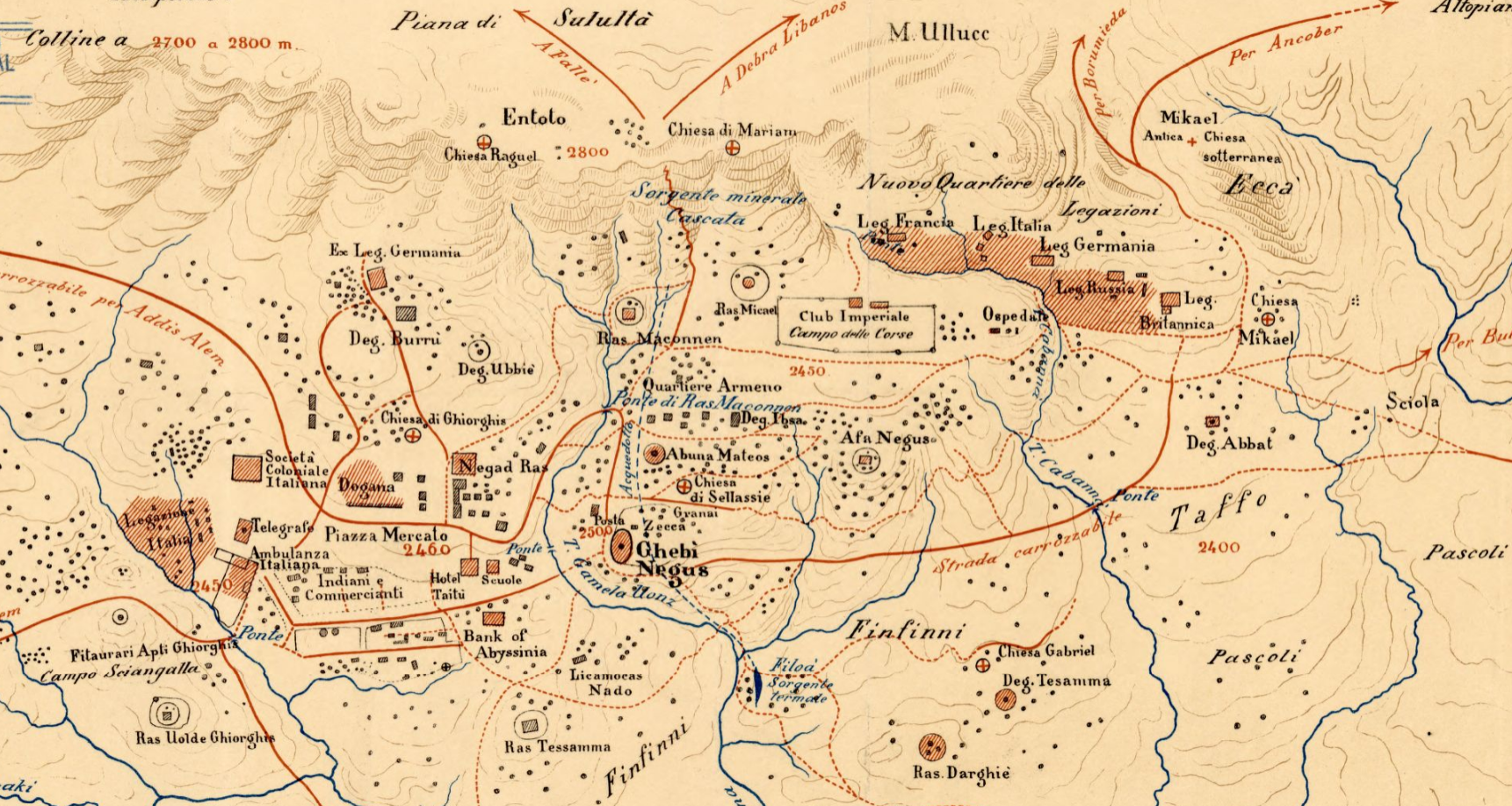
Italian map of Addis Ababa in 1909

In 1886, settlement began in the valley south of the mountain in a place called Finfinne, a name which refers to the presence of hot springs. The site was chosen by Empress Taytu Betul. Initially, she built a house for herself near the "Filwuha" hot mineral springs, where she and members of the Shewan Royal Court liked to take mineral baths. Empress Taytu persuaded Emperor Menelik II to move the capital from cold and windy Entoto to the plains below and named the new city Addis Ababa. By the next year large plots of land (Amharic: ሰፈር , sefer) had been allocated to the major nobility, other important personages and some churches. The local Oromo tribes had their lands confiscated and many were displaced. The city was originally founded as a katama (royal camp), with the sefer laid out mirroring an army on the march. The lands of Fitawrari Habte Giyorgis were furthest to the west, while the Imperial Palace of Menelik was in the centre, bracketed on each side by the leaders of the left (Qeñazmach) and right (Grazmach) wings of the army. The rear or area to the east of the palace was allocated to a Dejazmach or another prominent noble. Many of these original lands can still be traced back to the original military grants. Each sefer continued to be settled by each noble's retainers and slaves, usually brought from the lands he controlled. Among those ethnic groups, the Amhara, the Oromo, the Gurage, the Dorze and the Tigrayans would come in the largest numbers. The town grew by leaps and bounds. Not only for nobles, but also the site attracted numerous working classes including artisans, merchants, and foreign visitors.

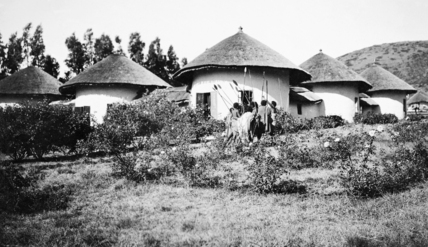
The earliest urban dwelling typically made up of hut cluster. Here is an example of British legation pictured in 1910.

Early residential dwelling was typically made of circular huts; walls were constructed with mud (Amharic: ጭቃ, cheka) and straw plastered on a wooden frame and thatched roofs. Addis Ababa's growth rate began with early rapid urbanization without preplanned intention. This was the time where nobilities embarked on concentrated permanent settlement, and altered by social patterns; i.e. each neighborhoods (sefer) was located on higher grounds, noncontiguous from adjacent settlements. The early social milieu contributed the contemporary admixture of a classic neighborhood. One of Emperor Menelik's contributions that are still visible today is the planting of numerous eucalyptus trees along the city streets.

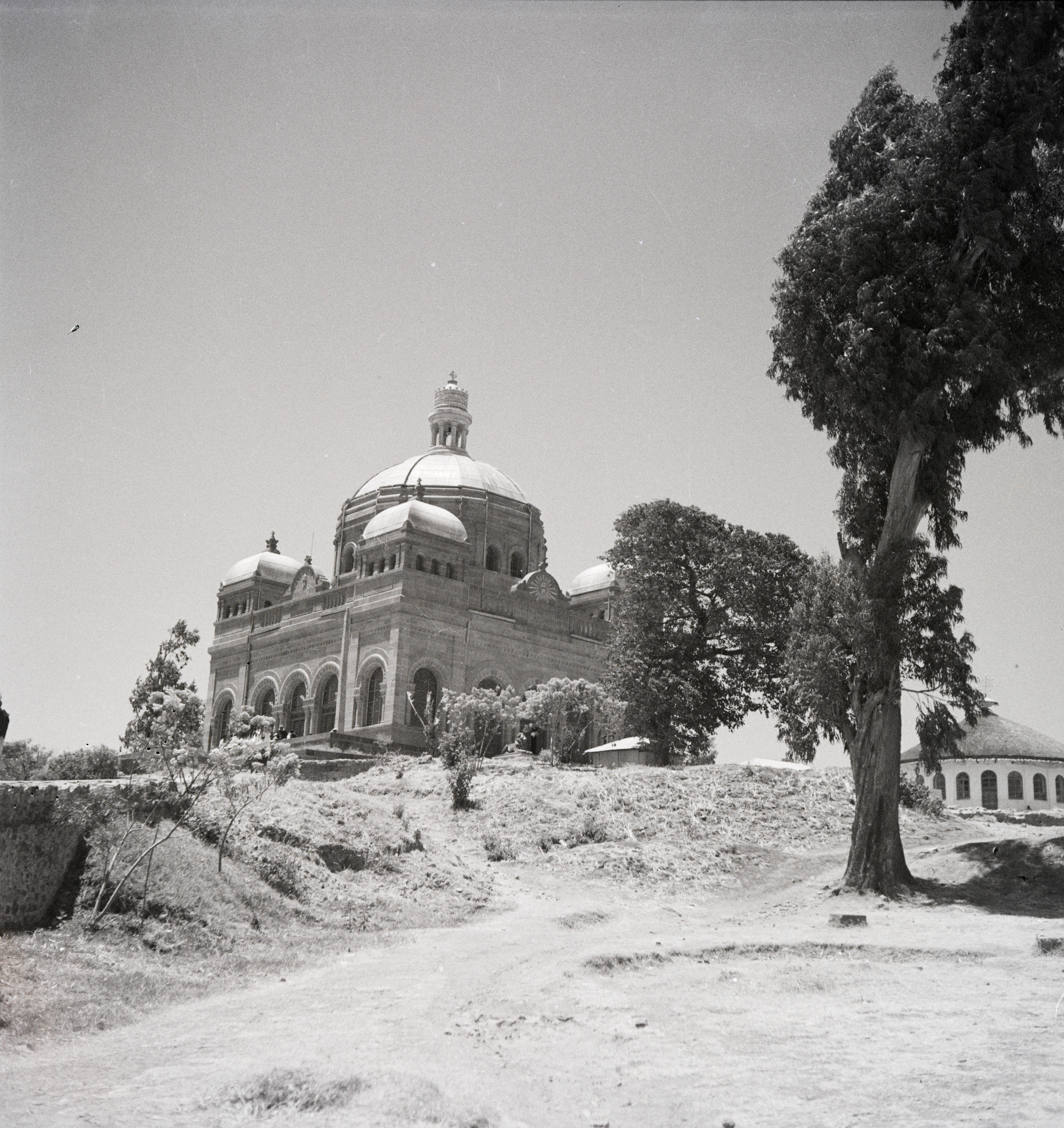
The Te'eka Negist Mausoleum at Menelik Palace in Addis Ababa, 1934.

Moreover, the city held strong social organization patterns prior to the Italian invasion. According to Richard Pankhurst (1968), the city's accelerated population growth was due to factors of provisional governors and their troops, the 1892 famine, and eventually the Battle of Adwa. Another includes the 1907 land act, municipal administration in 1909, and a railway and modernized transportation system boom beginning in the 20th century, culminating in continual growth. Additional supplements, for example the laying of Ethio-Djibouti Railways and topographical factors further led the city's boundary to expand southward.

=== 20th century ===
==== Pre-Italian occupation (1916–1935) ====
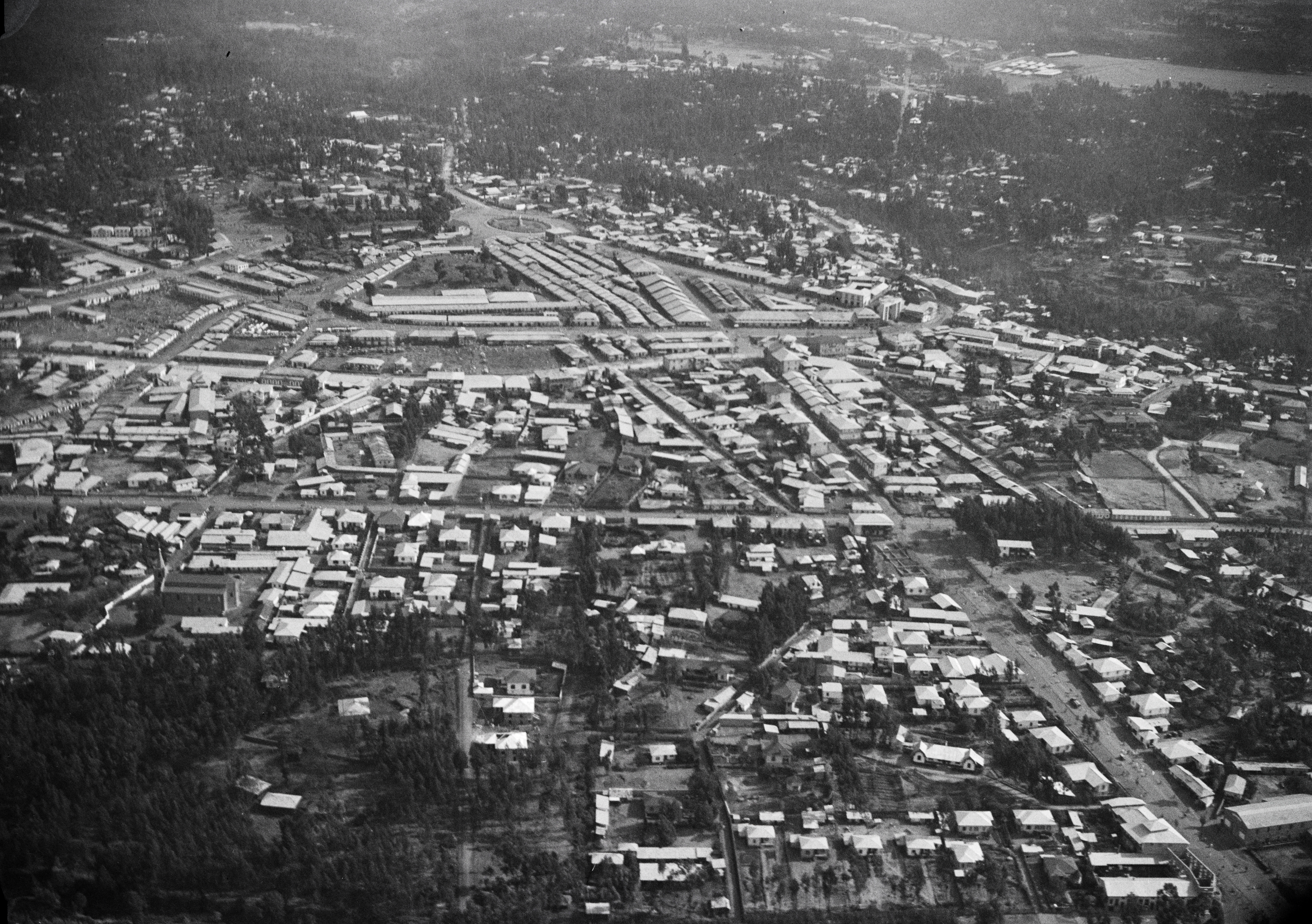
Addis Ababa in aerial view (1934)

Gebrehiwot Baykedagn took major administrative division post, and Addis Ababa–Djibouti railways in 1916, which also connects Addis Ababa with French Somaliland port of Djibouti. Ras Tafari Mekonnen, later became Emperor Haile Selassie I was the most powerful figure in the city following his appointment in 1917. He transformed the city by recognizing the importance of modernization and urbanization, and he distributed wealth to support emerging class. From this point, Ras Tafari gained a legitimate power as regency council in 1918.

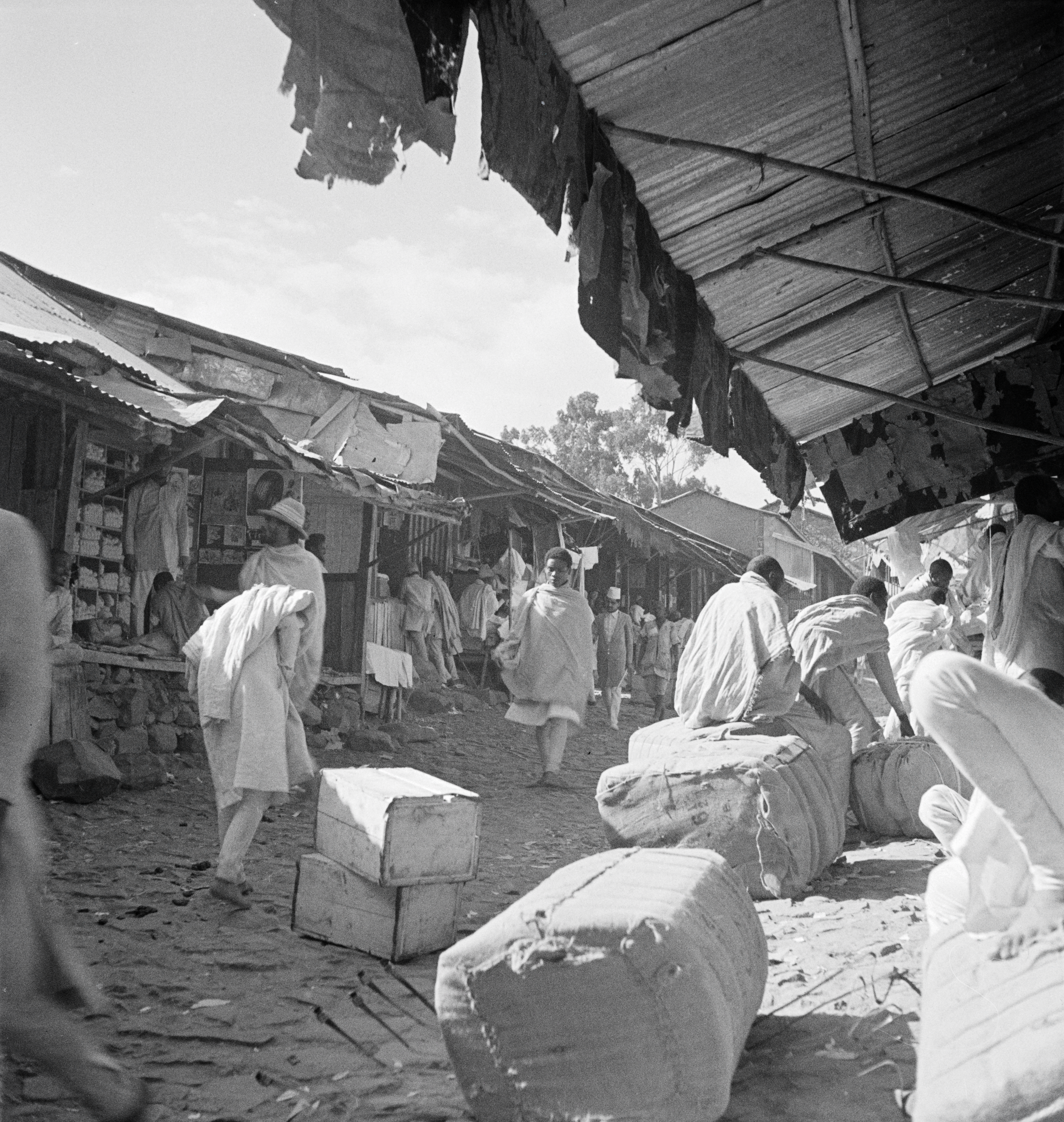
Marketplace in Addis Ababa (c. February 1934)

By 1926 and 1927, a large-scale economic revolution occurred, a surplus of coffee production began growing as a result of capital accumulation. Profiting from this wealth, the bourgeoisie benefited the city by constructing new, stone-fitted houses with imported European furniture and an importation of the latest automobiles, and expansion of banks across the locales. The total register of automobiles were 76 in 1926 and went to 578 in 1930. The first popular road transportation opened between Addis Ababa and Djibouti, about 156 km (97 mi) northward in the direction of Dessie. Initially intended to connect Italian occupied Assab with Addis Ababa in the Italo-Ethiopian Treaty of 1928, the road was considered for motor vehicle travel. The highway was important to the French railway of Djibouti and freight rate was very high with a lack of competition, and increase of cargo between Ethiopia and Assab.

In 1930, the Emperor was crowned and proceeded with new technologies and building infrastructure. Among them, he installed power lines and telephones, and erected several monuments (such as Meyazia 27 Square).

==== Italian occupation (1936–1941) ====
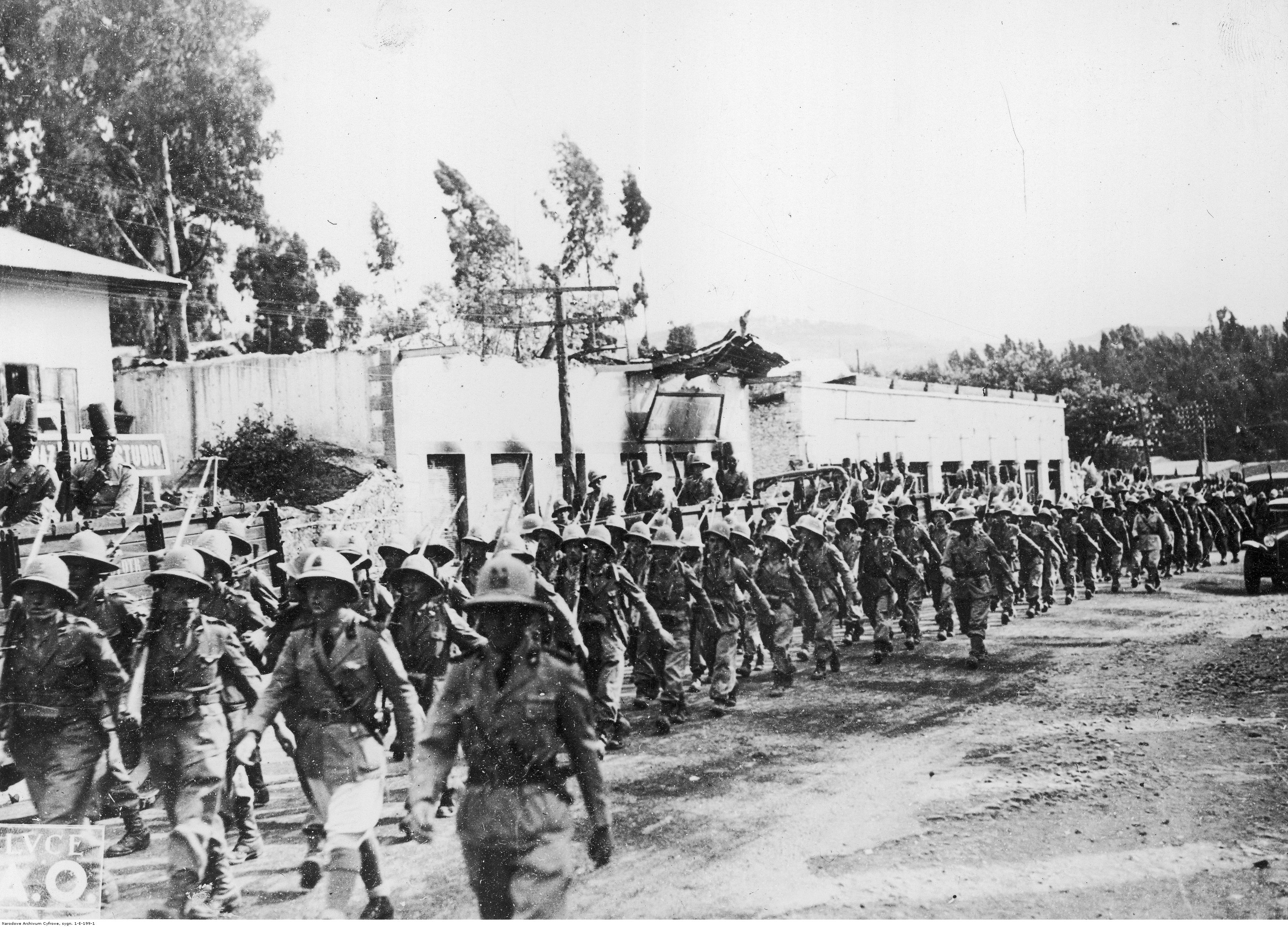
Military parade of Italian troops in Addis Ababa (1936)

Following all the major engagements of their invasion, the Italian troops from the colony of Eritrea entered Addis Ababa on 5 May 1936. Along with Dire Dawa, the city had been spared the aerial bombardment (including the use of chemical weapons such as mustard gas) practiced elsewhere in Ethiopia. This also allowed its railway to Djibouti to remain intact. After the occupation, the city served as the Duke of Aosta's capital for unified Italian East Africa until 1941, when it was abandoned in favour of Amba Alagi and other redoubts during the Second World War's East African Campaign. According to Soviet estimates, 15,000 Ethiopians casualties were victims of chemical weapons, especially by sulfur mustard.

The Italian ambition regarding Addis Ababa was to create a beautified colonial capital city along with a new master plan launched by seven architects such as Marcello Piacentini, Alessandro Bianchi, Enrico Del Debbio, Giuseppe Vaccaro, Le Corbusier, Ignazio Guidi and Cesare Valle. Despite contradictory and different ideas for each other, the plan was intended to focus on the general architectural plan of the city. Two preparations were approved from the master plan: the Le Corbusier and Guidi and Valle. During an invitation to Mussolini, the French Swiss architect Le Corbusier illustrated the master plan in a guideline sketch involving a traversing route monumental structure by a grand boulevard across the city from north to south, as he extracted from his 1930–1933 Radiant City concept. His two counterparts, Guildi and Valle prepared the master plan in summer 1936 likely emphasizing fascist ideology with monumental structure and no native Ethiopian participation in designing sector. Two parallel axis were drawn in European character connecting Arada/Giyorgis with the railway station to the south end five kilometres long and varied width spanning from 40 to 90 meters.

On 5 May 1941, the city was liberated by Major Orde Wingate and Emperor Haile Selassie for Ethiopian Gideon Force and Ethiopian resistance in time to permit Emperor Haile Selassie's return on 5 May 1941, five years to the day after he had left.

==== Post-Italian occupation (1941–1974) ====
In the aftermath, Addis Ababa suffered from economic stagnation and rapid population growth, the inner-city affected by urban morphology initiated by Italian occupation and the peripheral area were in urban sprawl. In 1946, Haile Selassie invited famous British master planner Sir Patrick Abercrombie with goals of modelling and beautifying the city to become the capital for Africa. By this organizing model, Abercrombie launched the master plan with neighborhood units surrounded by green parkways, and he was encouraged to draw ring roads characterized by radial shapes to channel traffic pathway from the central area.

His careful master plan of a major traffic route was completed by segregating neighborhood units, as he extracted from his 1943 London traffic problem. In 1959, the British consultant team named Bolton Hennessy and Partners commissioned an improvement of Abercrombie's 1954–1956 satellite towns. From the place, they did not incorporated outer area like Mekenissa and West of the old Air Port in the proposal, while Rapi, Gefersa, Kaliti and Kotebe proposed as outlet of Jimma, Ambo and Dessie respectively (the four regional highways). The Hennessy and Partners illustration would be physically larger to current size of Addis Ababa with surrounded satellite towns. In 1965, the French Mission for Urban Studies and Habitat led by Luis De Marien launched another master plan responsible to create monumental axis through Addis Ababa City Hall with an extension across Gofa Mazoria in the southern part of the city. Marien's difference to the previous Italian master plan was the use of single monumental axis while they used the double one.

Haile Selassie also helped to form the Organisation of African Unity in 1963, which was later dissolved in 2002 and replaced by the African Union (AU), which is also headquartered in the city, airports and industrial parks. The United Nations Economic Commission for Africa founded in 1958, also has its headquarters in Addis Ababa. Addis Ababa was also the site of the Council of the Oriental Orthodox Churches in 1965. Pankhurst (1962) noted in a survey of total land of 212 square kilometres, 58% owned by 1,768, owing to 10,000 square meters, and 12% were given to church whereas other small areas were still acquired in the name of posthumous nobilities such as Dejazemach Wube Haile Mariam, Fitawrari Aba Koran, and a bridge named "Fitawrari Habtegiorgis" after Habte Giyorgis Dinagde. According to the 1965 master plan, the city covered an area of 21,000 hectares and would increase to 51,000 hectares by 1984 master plan.

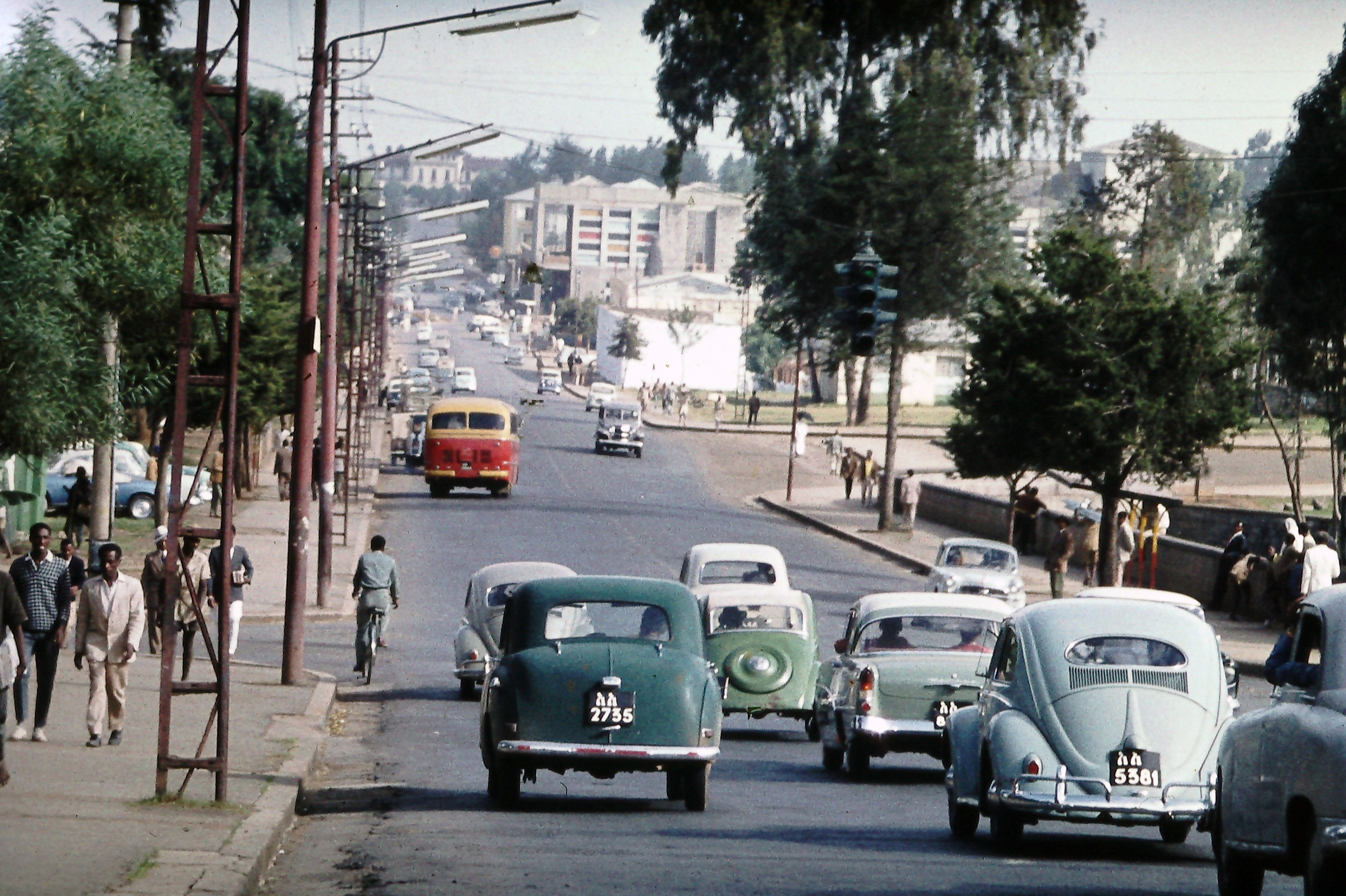
Churchill Road in 1960

In 1965, the first student march took place in response to the feudal imperial government of Haile Selassie, in which they chanted "Land for the Tiller", culminating in a Marxist–Leninist movement in Ethiopia. In addition, the 1973 oil crisis heavily impacted the city. 1,500 peasants in Addis Ababa marched to plead for food to be returned by police, and intellectual from Addis Ababa University forced the government to take a measure against the spreading famine, a report which Haile Selassie government denounced as "fabrication". Haile Selassie responded later "rich and poor have always existed and will, Why? Because there are those that work...and those that prefer to do nothing...Each individual is responsible for his misfortunes, his fate." Students around the city gathered to protest in February 1974; eventually Haile Selassie was successfully deposed from office in 1974 by a group of police officers. Later, the group named themselves Derg, officially "Provisional Military Administrative Council" (PMAC). The city had only 10 woredas.

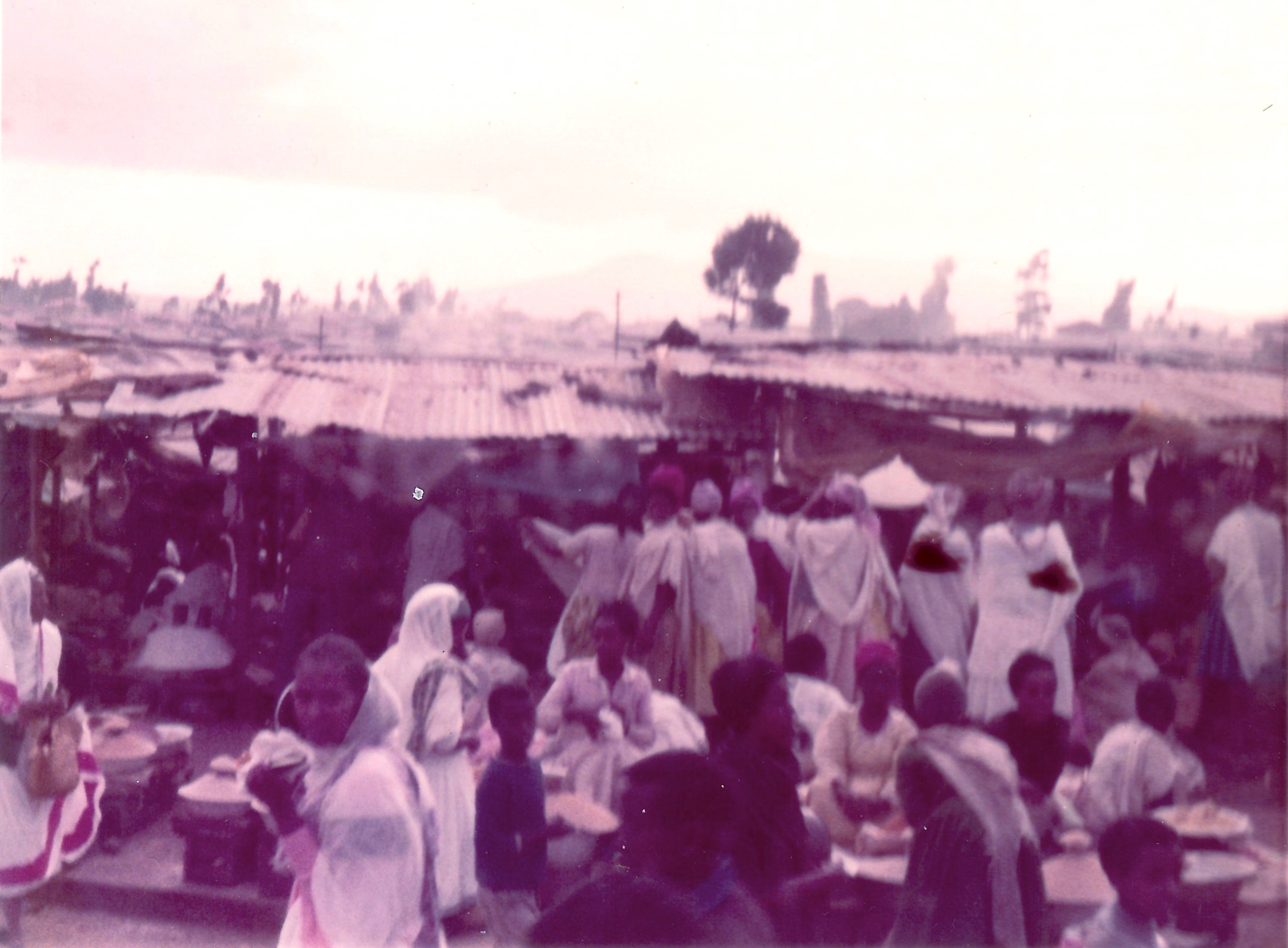
Marketplace on 3 October 1973

==== The Derg administration (1974–1991) ====
After the Derg came to power, roughly two-third of housing stock transferred to rental housing. The population growth declined from 6.5% to 3.7%. In 1975, the Derg nationalized "extra" rental structures built by private stockholders. As a result, the Proclamationon No. 47/1975 issued weakened buildings with small amount of living was administered by kebele units, while rental houses with large quality fell under Agency for Rental Housing Administration (ARHA). If those rental properties value less than 100 birr (US$48.31), they would be put under kebele administration. The administrative divisions showed an increase of woredas to 25 and 284 kebeles.

Hungarian architect C.K. Polonyi was the first person to embark the city's master plan during the Derg period with assistance of the Ministry of Urban Development and Housing. He used two formula concentrating an integration Addis Ababa with suburbs of rural areas and developing inner-city. Polonyi also worked to redesign Meskel Square, which was renamed Abiyot Square by the time, implemented immediately after the name change.

In 1986, the Italo-Ethiopian master plan was set up by 45 Ethiopian professionals along with 75 Italian experts with 207 sectorial reports documented as references. The plan dealt with a balanced urban system and services in urban area such as water supply. Akaki incorporated to Addis Ababa to supply industrial and freight terminal services. The bureaucratic rule of the Derg postponed the master plan for eight years until 1994, which caused failure of basic issues in public service and unplanned development.

==== Federal Democratic Republic (since 1991) ====
On 28 May 1991, the Ethiopian People's Revolutionary Democratic Front (EPRDF), a coalition party in course of overthrowing the Derg, seized Addis Ababa. They entered Menelik II Avenue and ordered a curfew for 24 hours. According to a witness, residents of Addis Ababa were ignorant and not terrified by the event, as the military told them everything was safe. The military went to central locations of the city (such as Hilton Hotel) and displayed banners "Peace, Solidarity, Friendship". At 5:30 am, they took control of the presidential palace and large-scale tanks were seen entering the area.

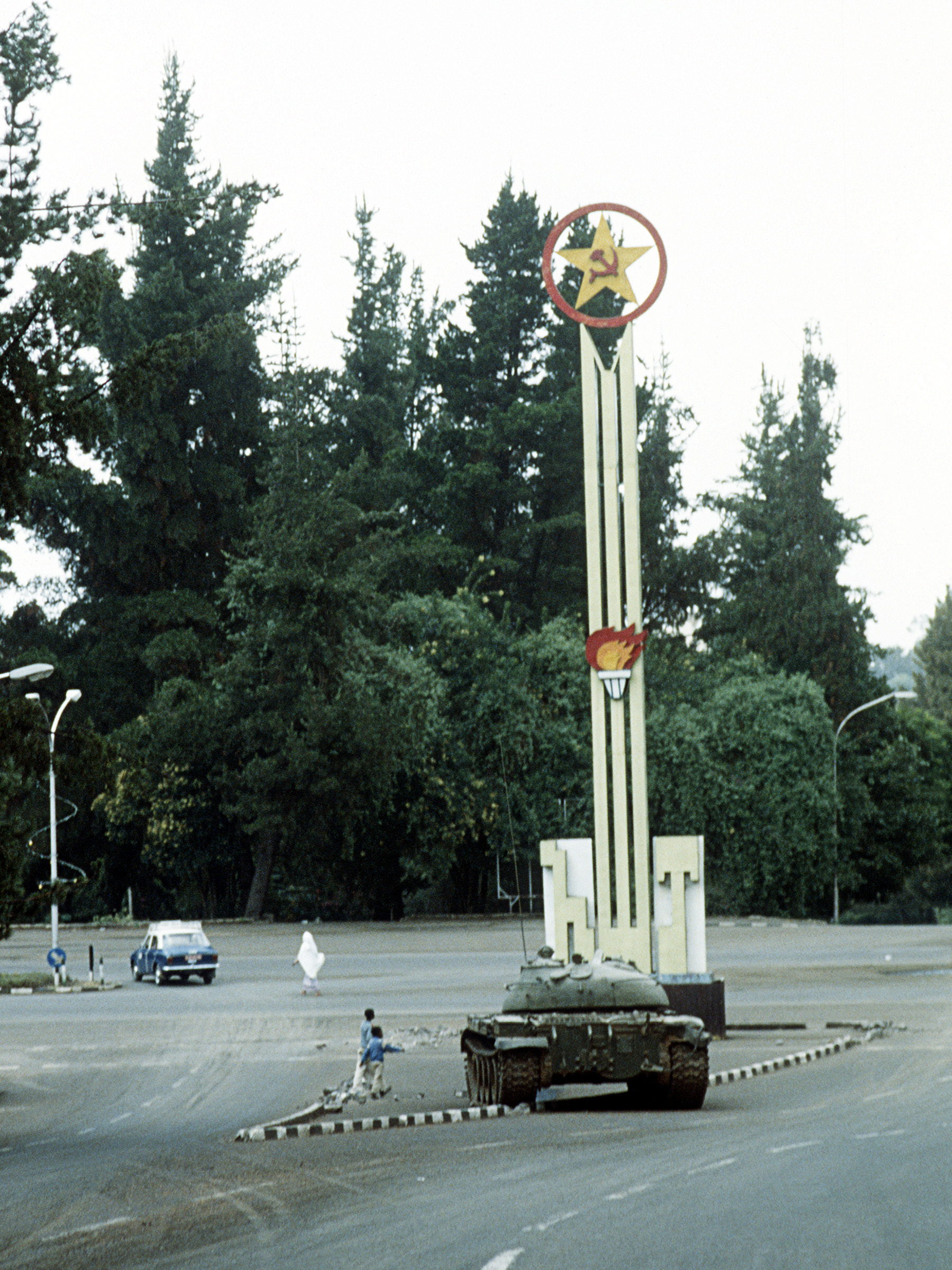
Tank in street of Addis Ababa shortly after the seizure of Ethiopian People's Revolutionary Democratic Front (EPRDF) from the Derg in 1991

A new constitution was adapted in 1994 and enacted a year later; while all cities in Ethiopia accountable rule by regional authority, Addis Ababa (Proclamation No 87/1997) and Dire Dawa (Proclamation No 416/2004) remained chartered cities, with mandates for self-governing and developmental centres. The Proclamation No. 112/1995 legitimized privatization of many government buildings, with a few exceptions, and the kebele buildings remained in tenure. The kebele dwelling and their largely unplanned settings continued to incorporated core areas of Addis Ababa.

=== 21st century ===
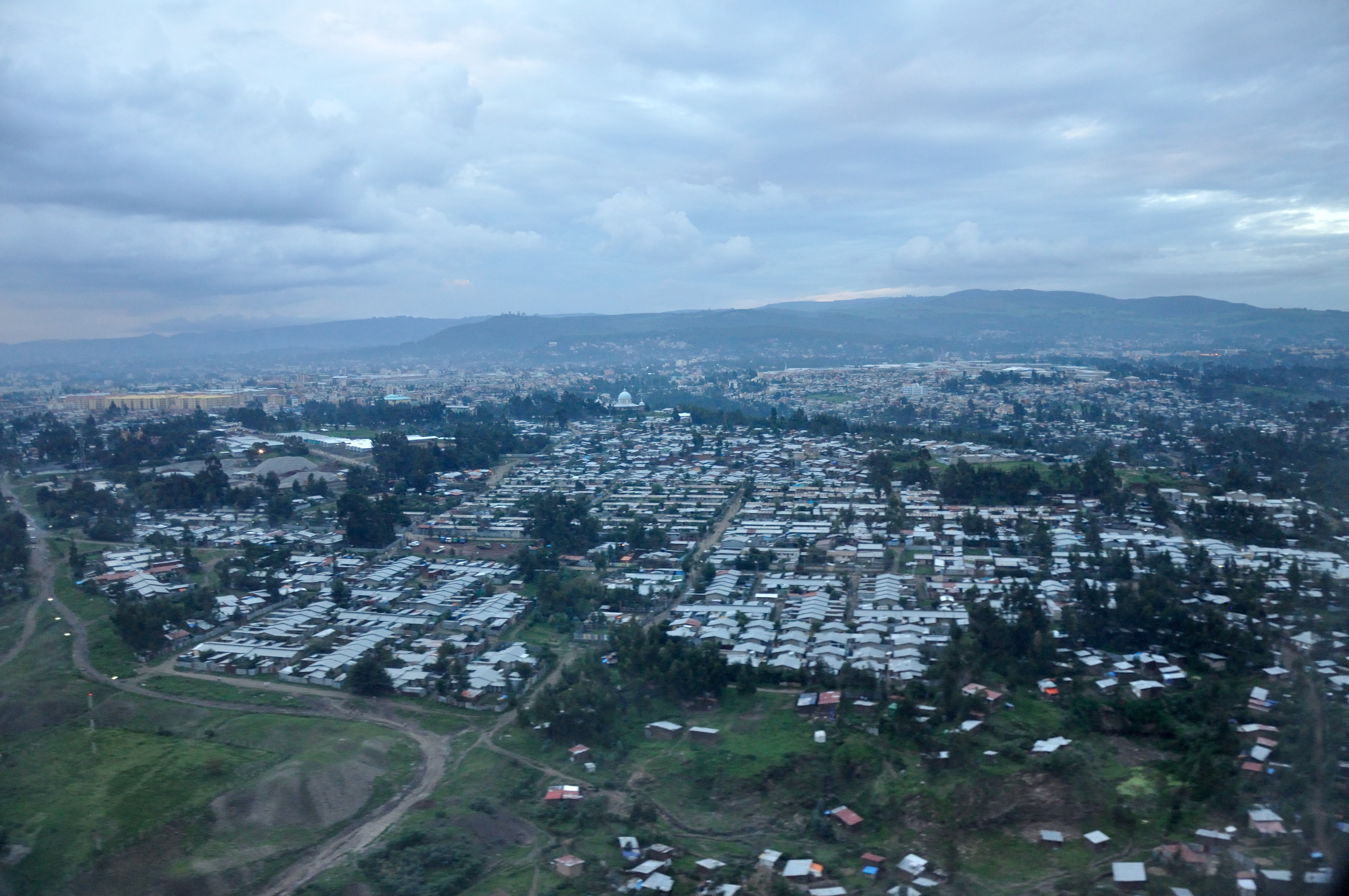
Addis Ababa landscape taken on 27 August 2009

From the end of 1998, new project was launched by Addis Ababa City Administration naming Office for Revision of Addis Ababa Master Plan (ORAAMP), covering from 1999 to 2003. The plan goal was to meet the standard of market economy with favourable political system resembles the revised 1986 master plan in terms of urban area.

==== 2014 Addis Ababa Master Plan ====
A controversial plan to expand the boundaries of Addis Ababa, by 1.1 million hectares into the Oromia special zone in April 2014, sparked the Oromo protests on 25 April 2014 against expansion of the boundaries of Addis Ababa. The government responded by shooting at and beating peaceful protesters. This escalated to full blown strikes and street protests on 12 November 2015 by university students in Ginchi town, located 80 km southwest of Addis Ababa city, encircled by Oromia Region. The controversial master plan was cancelled on 12 January 2016. By that time, 140 protesters were killed.

==== Recent history ====
United Nations Population Projections estimated the population of metro area of Addis Ababa to be 5,228,000 in 2022, a 4.43% increase from 2021. During Abiy Ahmed's premiership, Addis Ababa and its vicinities underwent Beautifying Sheger. This project is aimed to enhance the green coverage and beauty of the city. In 2018, Abiy initiated a project called "Riverside" planned to expand riverbanks for 56 kilometres (35 mi), from the Entoto Mountains to the Akaki River. In October 2022, the government launched Sheger City, an urban development model that contains 12 sub-cities, 36 districts and 40 rural kebeles with its seat located in Saris area in Addis Ababa. The project objective was to feed other satellite cities into Addis Ababa and contribute economic development within enclave. Several human rights groups as well as politicians criticized the process to build Sheger City due to inciting mass house demolitions that belonged to non-Oromo ethnic group, regional disparity by violating the constitutional rights of Oromo people.

== Relation with Oromia Regional State ==
Addis Ababa seen from the air, 2018

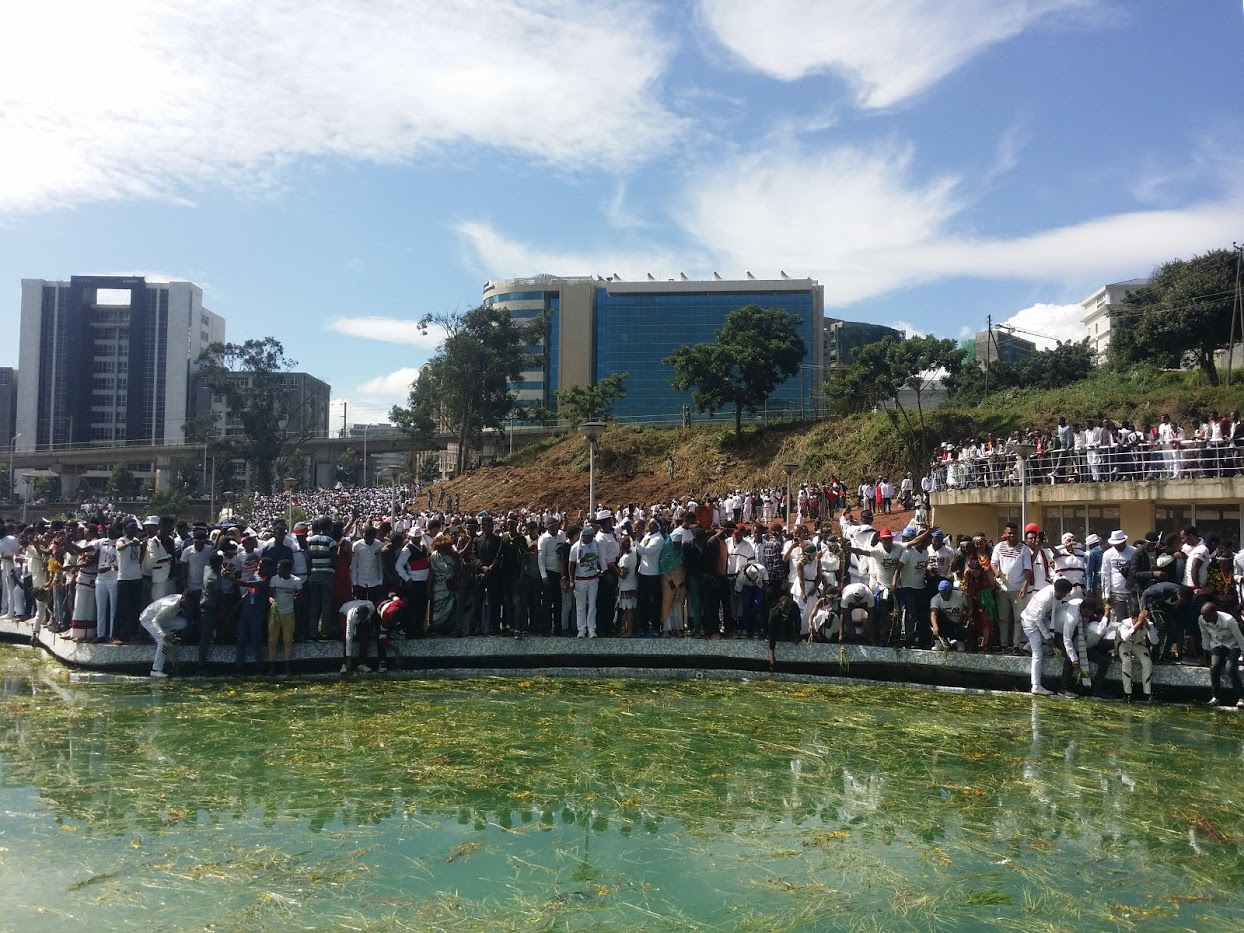
Thanksgiving Irreecha Festival in Addis Ababa

Addis Ababa is located in the heart of the Oromia state and the major ecosystem services to the city are provided by Oromia state. The city was abandoned by the Oromo since the late 19th century due to its conquest by Menelik. Oromos were physically removed from the vicinity of the city during the Haile Selassie and Derg eras. Article 49(5) of the Constitution of the Federal Democratic Republic of Ethiopia states:

"The special interest of the State of Oromia in Addis Ababa, regarding the provision of social services or the utilization of natural resources and other similar matters, as well as joint administrative matters arising from the location of Addis Ababa within the State of Oromia, shall be respected. Particulars shall be determined by law."

In 2000, Oromia's capital was moved from Addis Ababa to Adama. Because this move sparked considerable controversy and protests among Oromo students, the Oromo Peoples' Democratic Organization (OPDO), part of the ruling EPRDF coalition, on 10 June 2005, officially announced plans to move the regional capital back to Addis Ababa. Due to the historical and natural connection between the city and the Oromo people, the Oromia Government has asserted its ownership of Addis Ababa. Both the current mayor of Addis Ababa, Adanech Abebe, and the former mayor, Takele Uma Banti are from the former ruling party of Oromia.

== Geography ==
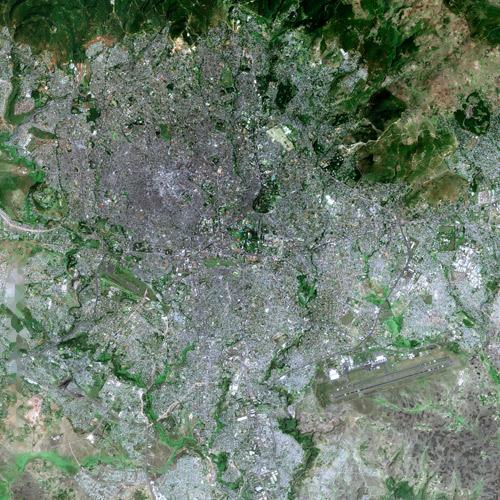
Addis Ababa seen from SPOT satellite

District map of Addis Ababa

Addis Ababa lies in the Ethiopian Highlands, bordering the western edge of the Great Rift Valley, at an elevation of 2,355 metres (7,726 ft) in what was a grassland. The city lies at the foot of Mount Entoto and forms part of the watershed for the Awash. From its lowest point, around Bole International Airport, at 2,326 metres (7,631 ft) above sea level in the southern periphery, Addis Ababa rises to over 3,000 metres (9,800 ft) in the Entoto Mountains to the north.

=== Subdivision ===
The city is divided into 10 boroughs, called subcities (Amharic: ክፍለ ከተማ, kifle ketema), and 99 wards (Amharic: ቀበሌ, kebele). The 10 subcities are:

Nr	Subcity	Area (km^{2})	Population	Density	Map
1	Addis Ketema	7.41	271,644	36,659.1	
2	Akaky Kaliti	118.08	195,273	1,653.7	
3	Arada	9.91	225,999	23,000	
4	Bole	122.08	328,900	2,694.1	
5	Gullele	30.18	284,865	9,438.9	
6	Kirkos	14.62	235,441	16,104	
7	Kolfe Keranio	61.25	546,219	7,448.5	
8	Lideta	9.18	214,769	23,000	
9	Nifas Silk-Lafto	68.30	335,740	4,915.7	
10	Yeka	85.46	337,575	3950.1	

*Lemi-Kura sub-city was added as the eleventh sub-city of Addis Ababa in 2020

=== Climate ===
Addis Ababa

Climate chart (precipitation, max. and min. temperature)
J	F	M	A	M	J	J	A	S	O	N	D
13 24 9	34 25 10	66 26 12	91 25 12	76 25 12	119 24 12	238 21 12	242 21 12	132 22 11	32 23 10	5.3 23 8	7.5 23 8
- █ Average max. and min. temperatures in °C
- █ Precipitation totals in mm
- Source: NMAE
Imperial conversion
J	F	M	A	M	J	J	A	S	O	N	D
0.5 75 47	1.3 78 50	2.6 78 53	3.6 78 54	3 78 54	4.7 74 53	9.4 70 53	9.5 70 53	5.2 71 52	1.3 74 49	0.2 74 47	0.3 74 46
- █ Average max. and min. temperatures in °F
- █ Precipitation totals in inches

Addis Ababa has a subtropical highland climate (Köppen: Cwb) with precipitation varying considerably by the month. The city has a complex mix of alpine climate zones, with temperature differences of up to 10 °C (18 °F), depending on elevation and prevailing wind patterns. The high elevation moderates temperatures year-round, and the city's position near the Equator means that temperatures are very constant from month to month. As such the climate would be maritime if its elevation was not taken into account, as no month is above 22 °C (72 °F) in mean temperatures.

Mid-November to January is a season for occasional rain. The highland climate regions are characterised by dry winters, and this is the dry season in Addis Ababa. During this season the daily maximum temperatures are usually not more than 23 °C (73 °F), and the night-time minimum temperatures will range from 5 °C to 10 °C and can drop to freezing. The short rainy season is from February to May. During this period, the difference between the daytime maximum temperatures and the nighttime minimum temperatures is not as great as during other times of the year, with minimum temperatures in the range of 10–15 °C (50–59 °F). At this time of the year, the city experiences warm temperatures and pleasant rainfall. The long wet season is from June to mid-September; it is the coldest time of the year. This period coincides with summer, but the temperatures are much lower than at other times of year because of the frequent rain and hail and the abundance of cloud cover and fewer hours of sunshine. This time of the year is characterised by dark, chilly and wet days and nights. The autumn which follows is a transitional period between the wet and dry seasons.

The highest temperature on record was 30.6 °C (87.1 °F) 26 February 2019, while the lowest temperature on record was 0 °C (32 °F), recorded on multiple occasions.

Climate data for Addis Ababa (1991–2020, extremes 1898–present)
Month	Jan	Feb	Mar	Apr	May	Jun	Jul	Aug	Sep	Oct	Nov	Dec	Year
Record high °C (°F)	28.8 (83.8)	30.6 (87.1)	30.0 (86.0)	30.2 (86.4)	29.6 (85.3)	29.0 (84.2)	29.1 (84.4)	28.0 (82.4)	25.6 (78.1)	27.1 (80.8)	29.7 (85.5)	26.5 (79.7)	30.6 (87.1)
Mean daily maximum °C (°F)	23.9 (75.0)	25.3 (77.5)	25.8 (78.4)	25.4 (77.7)	25.3 (77.5)	23.6 (74.5)	21.2 (70.2)	20.9 (69.6)	21.9 (71.4)	23.3 (73.9)	23.3 (73.9)	23.1 (73.6)	23.6 (74.5)
Daily mean °C (°F)	16.3 (61.3)	17.6 (63.7)	18.6 (65.5)	18.8 (65.8)	18.8 (65.8)	17.5 (63.5)	16.5 (61.7)	16.4 (61.5)	16.6 (61.9)	16.5 (61.7)	15.9 (60.6)	15.5 (59.9)	17.1 (62.8)
Mean daily minimum °C (°F)	8.6 (47.5)	9.9 (49.8)	11.6 (52.9)	12.2 (54.0)	12.2 (54.0)	11.7 (53.1)	11.9 (53.4)	11.8 (53.2)	11.3 (52.3)	9.7 (49.5)	8.3 (46.9)	7.5 (45.5)	10.6 (51.1)
Record low °C (°F)	0.0 (32.0)	0.0 (32.0)	0.0 (32.0)	2.5 (36.5)	4.0 (39.2)	4.2 (39.6)	5.4 (41.7)	5.7 (42.3)	3.9 (39.0)	0.0 (32.0)	0.0 (32.0)	0.0 (32.0)	0.0 (32.0)
Average rainfall mm (inches)	13.0 (0.51)	33.7 (1.33)	66.3 (2.61)	91.2 (3.59)	76.0 (2.99)	118.9 (4.68)	238.3 (9.38)	241.8 (9.52)	132.2 (5.20)	32.2 (1.27)	5.3 (0.21)	7.5 (0.30)	1,056.4 (41.59)
Average rainy days (≥ 0.1 mm)	3	5	7	10	10	20	27	26	18	4	1	1	132
Average relative humidity (%)	52	51	53	59	55	68	78	80	75	57	53	53	62
Mean monthly sunshine hours	266.6	206.2	241.8	210.0	238.7	174.0	111.6	133.3	162.0	248.0	267.0	288.3	2,547.5
Mean daily sunshine hours	8.6	7.3	7.8	7.0	7.7	5.8	3.6	4.3	5.4	8.0	8.9	9.3	7.0
Source 1: Météo Climat Ethiopian Meteorological Institute (rainfall)
Source 2: World Meteorological Organisation (rainy days 1981–2010), Deutscher Wetterdienst (humidity 1951–1990, and sun 1985–1998)

== Demographics ==
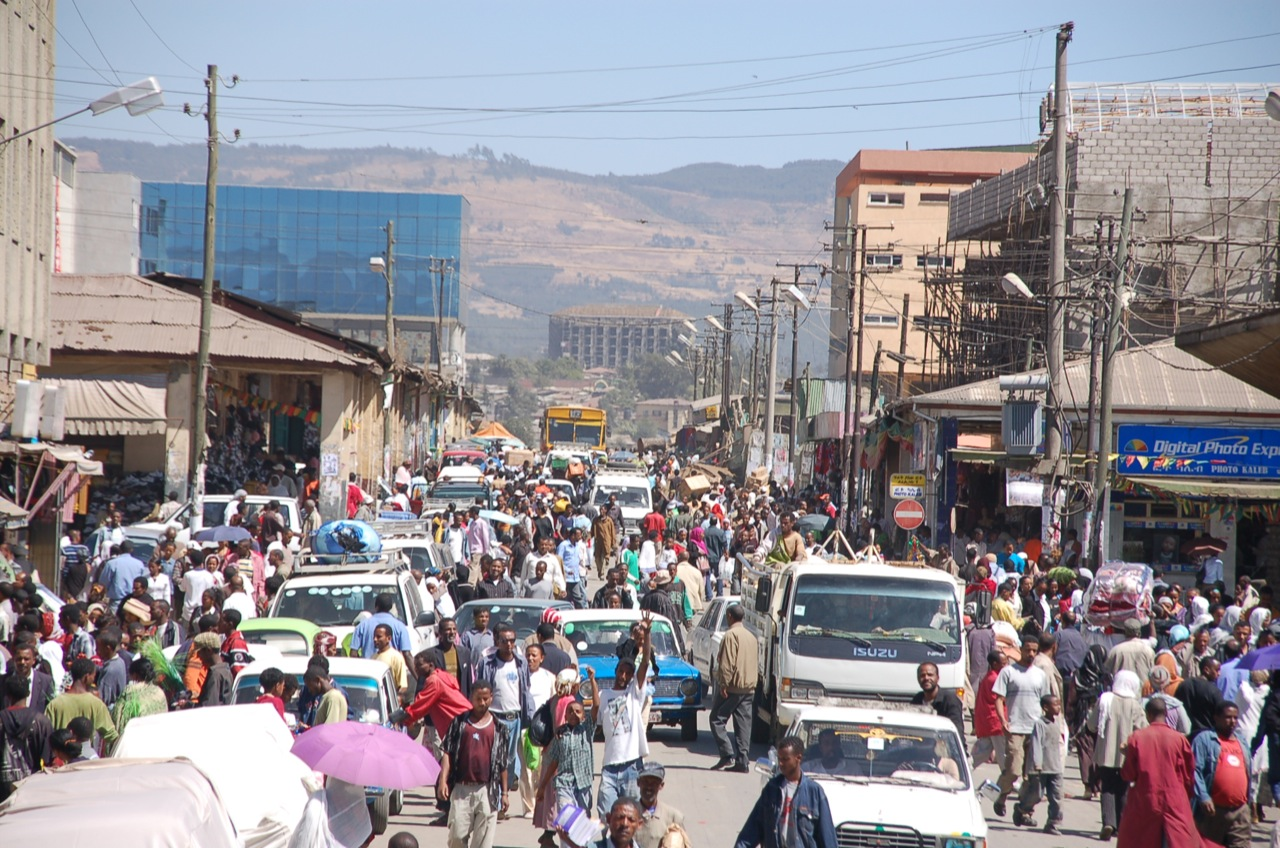
People in Addis Ababa

As of the 2007 population census conducted by the Ethiopian national statistics authorities, Addis Ababa has a total population of 2,739,551 urban and rural inhabitants. For the capital city 662,728 households were counted living in 628,984 housing units, which results in an average of 5.3 persons to a household. Although all Ethiopian ethnic groups are represented in Addis Ababa because it is the capital of the country, the largest groups include the Amhara (47.05%), Oromo (19.51%), Gurage (16.34%), Tigrayan (6.18%), Silt'e (2.94%), and Gamo (1.68%). Languages spoken as mother tongues include Amharic (70.99%), Afaan Oromo (10.72%), Gurage (8.37%), Tigrinya (3.60%), Silt'e (1.82%) and Gamo (1.03%). The religion with the most believers in Addis Ababa is Ethiopian Orthodox with 43% of the population, while 33% are Muslim, 20% Protestant, and 0.48% Catholic.

Ethnic groups of Addis Ababa (2007)
1. Amhara (47.0%)
2. Oromo (19.5%)
3. Gurage (16.3%)
4. Tigrayan (6.18%)
5. Silt'e (2.94%)
6. Gamo (1.68%)
7. Other (6.30%)
Religion in Addis Ababa (2007)
1. Ethiopian Orthodox (74.6%)
2. Muslim (16.2%)
3. P'ent'ay (7.80%)
4. Catholic (0.50%)
5. Traditional faiths (0.10%)
6. Other (0.80%)

In the previous census, conducted in 1994, the city's population was reported to be 2,112,737, of whom 1,023,452 were men and 1,089,285 were women. At that time, not all of the population were urban inhabitants; only 2,084,588 or 98.7% were. For the entire administrative council there were 404,783 households in 376,568 housing units, with an average of 5.2 persons per household. The major ethnic groups included the Amhara (48.27%), Oromo (19.24%), Gurage (13.54%; 9.40% Sebat Bet, and 4.14% Sodo), Tigrayan 7.65%, Silt'e 3.98%, and foreigners from Eritrea 1.34%. Languages spoken included Amharic (72.64%), Afaan Oromo (10.01%), Gurage (6.45%), Tigrinya (5.41%), and Silt'e 2.29%. In 1994 the predominant religion was also Ethiopian Orthodox with 82.0% of the population, while 12.67% were Muslim, 3.87% Protestant, and 0.78% Catholic.

Historical population
Year	Pop.	±%
1984	1,412,575	—
1994	2,112,737	+49.6%
2007	2,739,551	+29.7%
2023	3,945,000	+44.0%

=== Standard of living ===
According to the 2007 national census, 98.64% of the housing units of Addis Ababa had access to safe drinking water, while 14.9% had flush toilets, 70.7% pit toilets (both ventilated and unventilated), and 14.3% had no toilet facilities. In 2014, there were 63 public toilets in the city, with plans to build more. Values for other reported common indicators of the standard of living for Addis Ababa as of 2005 include the following: 0.1% of the inhabitants fall into the lowest wealth quintile; adult literacy for men is 93.6% and for women 79.95%, the highest in the nation for both sexes; and the civic infant mortality rate is 45 infant deaths per 1,000 live births, which is less than the nationwide average of 77; at least half of these deaths occurred in the infants' first month of life.

Outdoor and indoor air and surface and groundwater urban and environmental pollution is largely unregulated in Abbis Ababa. Wastewater is untreated and most is discharged into rivers. At 2017 the increase in air pollution due to anthropogenic emissions was found to have increased by around 62% since the 1970s, indicated by a 34% loss in visibility. A 2021 study found annual mean PM2.5 concentrations of 10 μg/m3A, 1.7 times higher than the WHO-recommended 24-hour guideline, to which chronic respiratory disease and an annual total of 502 deaths (4.44%) were attributable.

The city is partially powered by water turbines at the Koka Reservoir.

== Economy ==
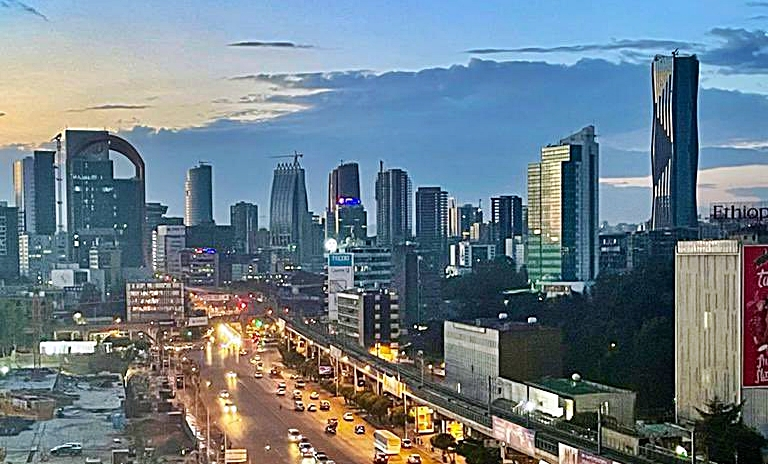
Addis Ababa skyline in 2021

The economic activities in Addis Ababa are diverse. According to official statistics from the federal government, some 119,197 people in the city are engaged in trade and commerce; 113,977 in manufacturing and industry; 80,391 homemakers of a different variety; 71,186 in civil administration; 50,538 in transport and communication; 42,514 in education, health and social services; 32,685 in hotel and catering services; and 16,602 in agriculture. In addition to the residents of rural parts of Addis Ababa, the city dwellers also participate in animal husbandry and the cultivation of gardens. 677 hectares (1,670 acres) of land is irrigated annually, on which 129,880 quintals of vegetables are cultivated. It is a relatively clean and safe city, with the most common crimes being pickpocketing, scams and minor burglary. The city has recently been in a construction boom with tall buildings rising in many places. Various luxury services have also become available and the construction of shopping malls has recently increased. According to Tia Goldenberg of IOL, area spa professionals said that some people have labelled the city, "the spa capital of Africa."

Ethiopian Airlines has its headquarters on the grounds of Addis Ababa Bole International Airport in Addis Ababa.

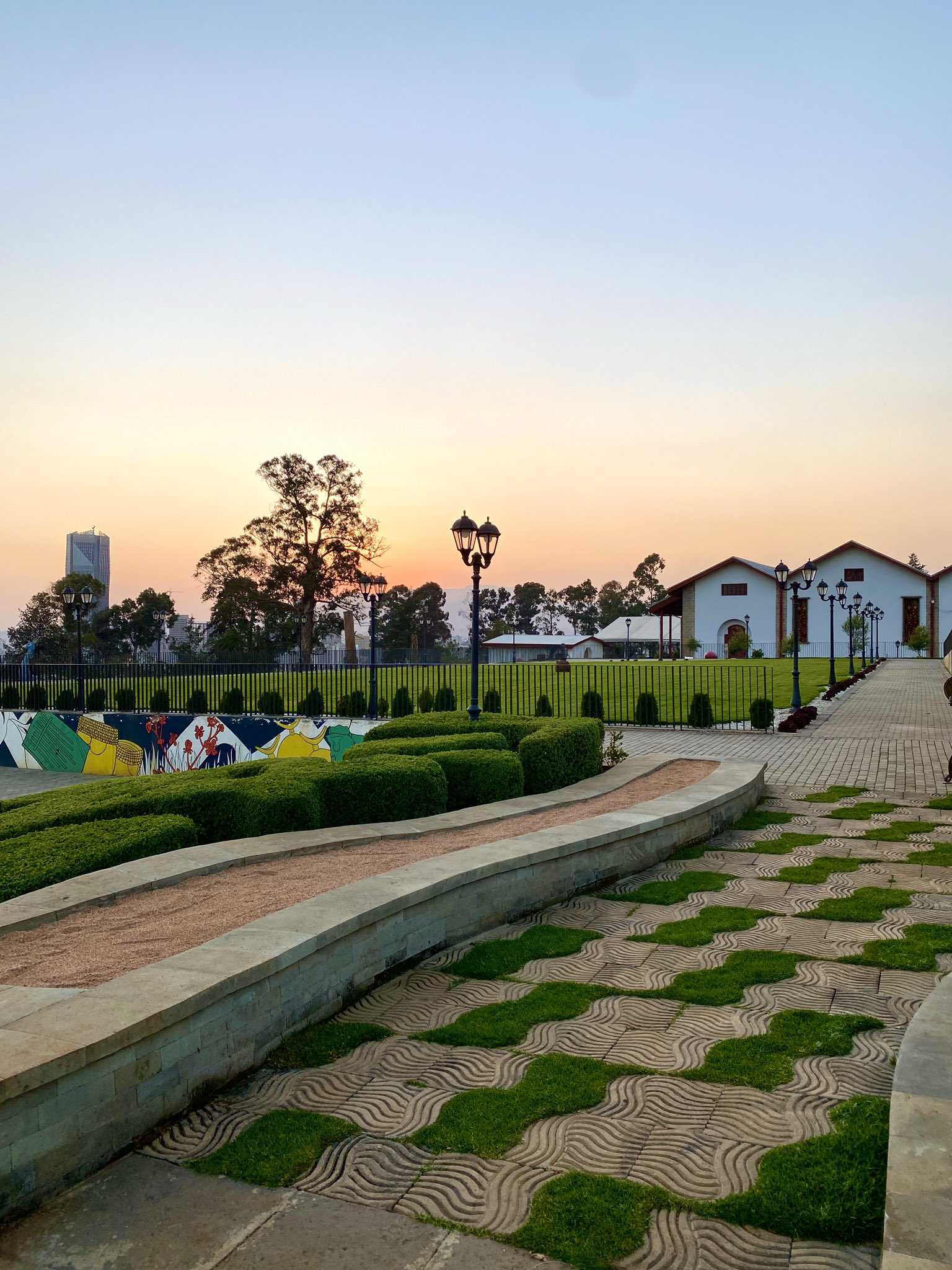
Unity Park zoo in Addis Ababa

=== Development ===
The city hosts the We Are the Future centre, a child care centre that provides children with a higher standard of living. The centre is managed under the direction of the mayor's office, and the international NGO Glocal Forum serves as the fundraiser and program planner and coordinator for the WAF child centre in each city. Each WAF city is linked to several peer cities and public and private partners to create a unique international coalition.

Launched in 2004, the program is the result of a strategic partnership between the Glocal Forum, the Quincy Jones Listen Up Foundation, and Mr Hani Masri, with the support of the World Bank, UN agencies and major companies.

=== Tourism ===
Tourism is a growing industry within Addis Ababa and Ethiopia as a whole. In July 2015, the European Council on Tourism and Trade named Ethiopia the best nation for inbound tourism. The COVID-19 pandemic and Tigray War caused a decrease in tourism.

==== Zoo ====
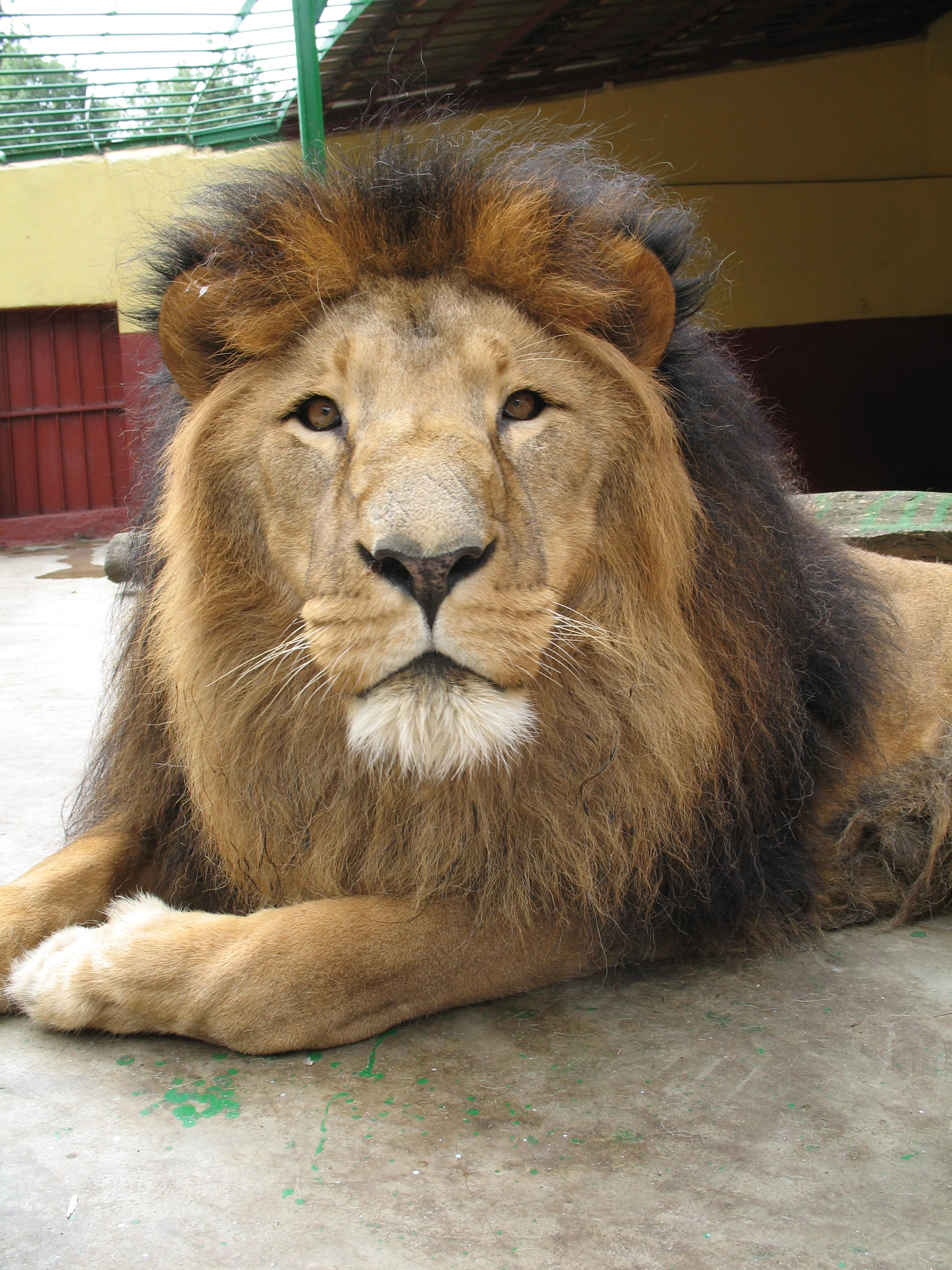
A male lion at Addis Ababa Zoo

Addis Ababa Zoo kept 15 lions in 2011. Their hair samples were used in a genetic analysis, which revealed that they were genetically diverse. It was therefore proposed to include them in a captive breeding programme.

== Law and government ==
=== Government ===
Under the Ethiopian Constitution of 1995, the city of Addis Ababa is one of the two federal cities that are accountable to the Federal Government of Ethiopia. The other city with the same status is Dire Dawa in the east of the country and both are federal cities. Earlier, following the establishment of the federal structure in 1991 under the Transitional Charter of Ethiopia, the City Government of Addis Ababa was one of the then-new 14 regional governments. However, that structure was changed by the federal constitution in 1995 and as a result, Addis Ababa does not have statehood status.

The administration of Addis Ababa city consists of the Mayor, who leads the executive branch, and the City Council, which enacts city regulations. However, as part of the Federal Government, the federal legislature enacts laws that are binding in Addis Ababa. Members of the City Council are directly elected by the residents of the city and the council, in turn, elects the Mayor among its members. The term of office for elected officials is five years. However, the Federal Government, when it deems necessary, can dissolve the City Council and the entire administration and replace it with a temporary administration until elections take place next. Residents of Addis Ababa are represented in the federal legislature, the House of Peoples' Representatives. However, the city is not represented in the House of Federation, which is the federal upper house constituted by the representatives of the member states. The executive branch under the Mayor comprises the City Manager and various branches of civil service offices.

Adanech Abebe is serving as the mayor of Addis Ababa since 2020, preceded by Takele Uma Banti. She is the first woman to hold mayorship since its creation in 1910. Before Takele, the Federal Government appointed Berhane Deressa to lead the temporary caretaker administration that served from 9 May 2006 to 30 October 2008 following the 2005 election crisis. In the 2005 national election, the ruling EPRDF party suffered a major defeat in Addis Ababa. However, the opposition who won in Addis Ababa did not take part in the government both on the regional and federal levels. This situation forced the EPRDF-led Federal Government to assign a temporary administration until a new election was carried out. As a result, Berhane Deressa, an independent citizen, was appointed.

Former mayors of Addis Ababa include Arkebe Oqubay (2003–06), Zewde Teklu (1985–89), Alemu Abebe (1977–85) and Zewde Gebrehiwot (1960–69).

=== Crime ===
Addis Ababa is considered to be extremely safe in comparison to the other cities in the region. However, there are a number of crimes within the city including theft, scams, mugging, robbery and others. Rural-urban migration and unemployment has been preliminary factors affecting the city by elevating crime rate.

The Addis Ababa Federal Police is the main department of the Federal Police established in 2003.

== Places of worship ==
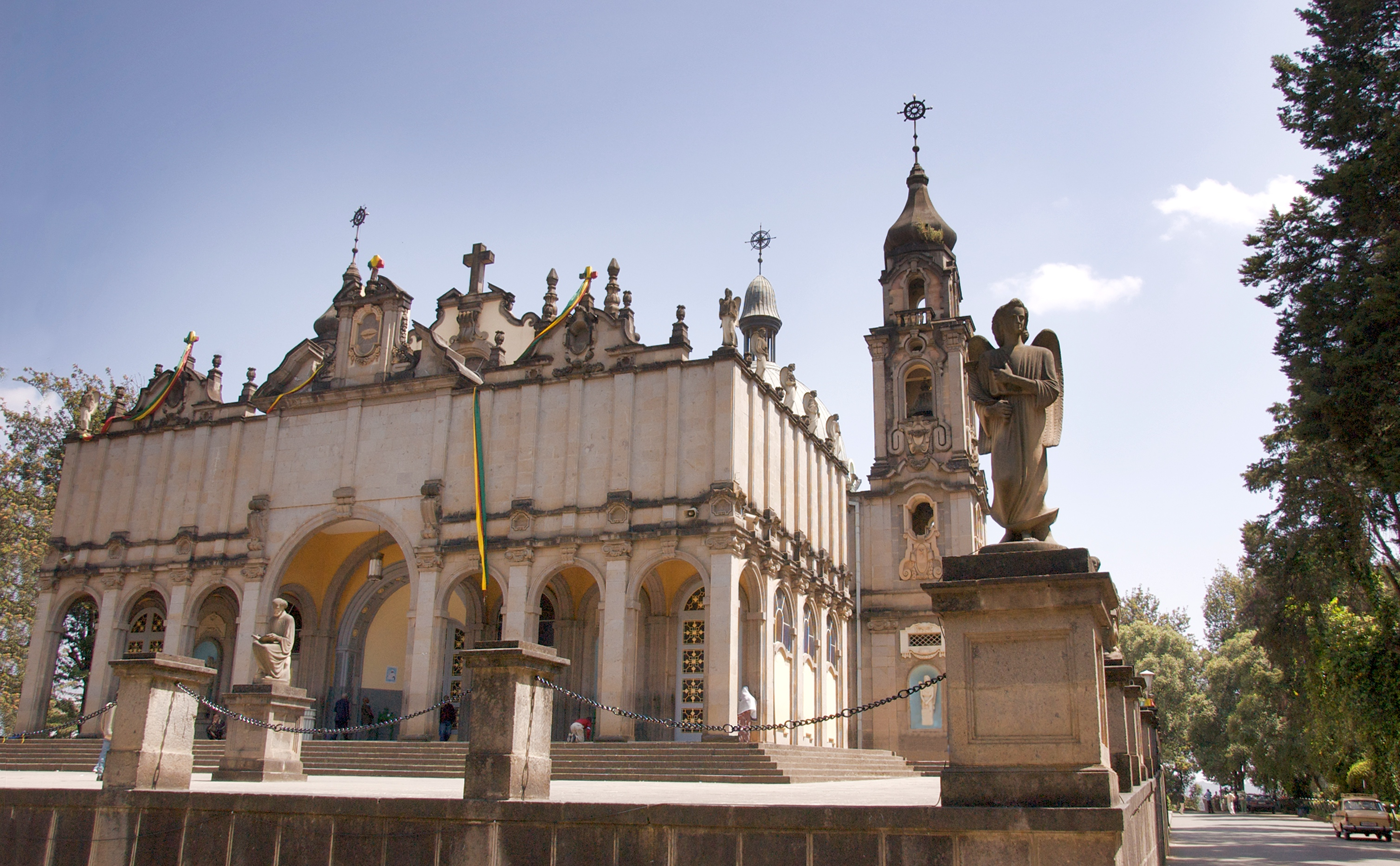
Holy Trinity Cathedral, the seat of the Ethiopian Orthodox Tewahedo Church

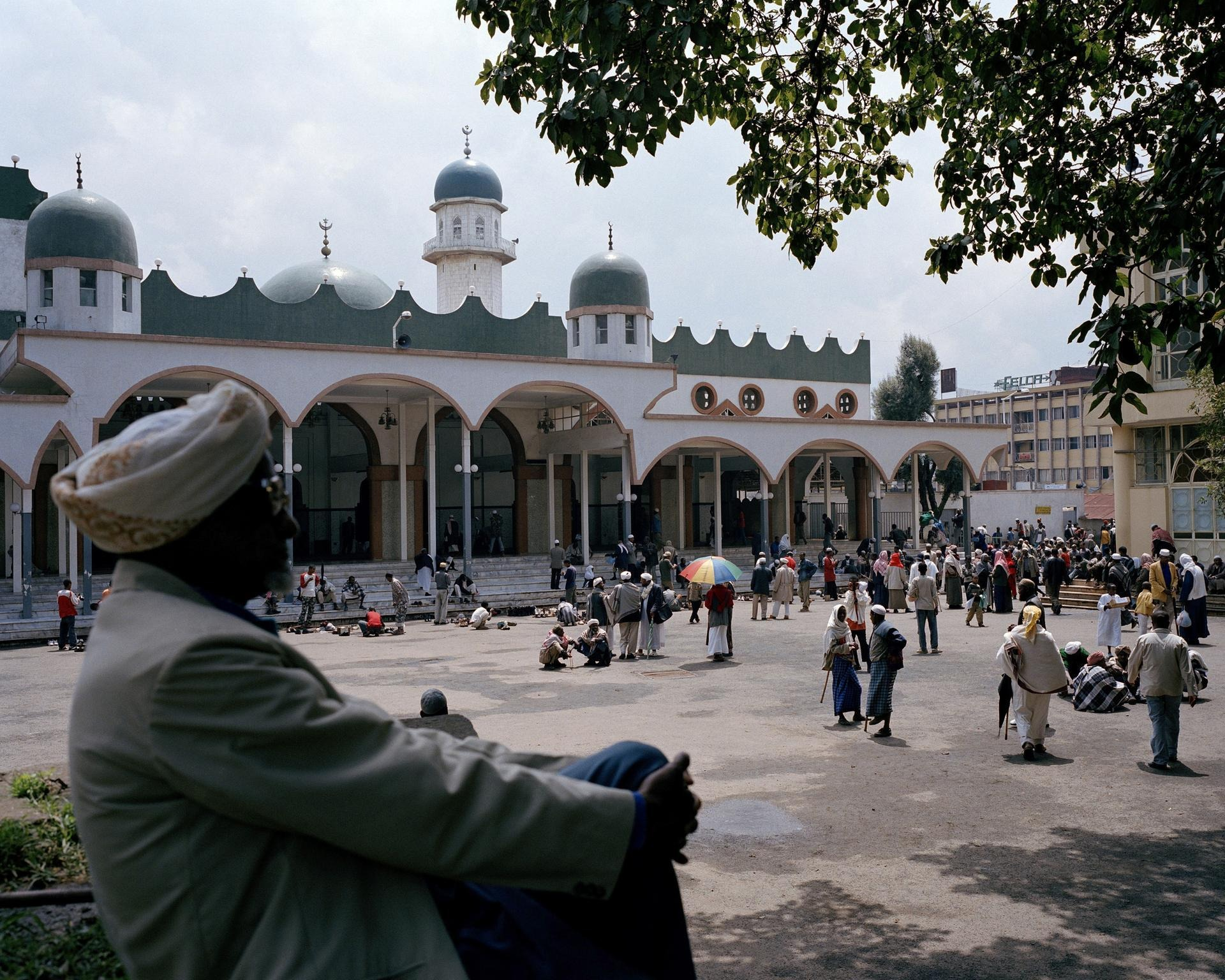
Grand Anwar Mosque is the largest mosque in Addis Ababa

Among the places of worship, there are predominantly Christian churches and temples: Seventh-day Adventist Church, Ethiopian Orthodox Tewahedo Church, Ethiopian Evangelical Church Mekane Yesus (Lutheran World Federation), Ethiopian Kale Heywet Church, Ethiopian Catholic Archeparchy of Addis Ababa (Catholic Church), Ethiopian Full Gospel Believers' Church and also Muslim mosques.

In most churches, Emperor Haile Selassie employed political propagandic panel that demonstrate his imperial power, cult of personality and ultranationalist views. Saint George's Cathedral has central of subjects involving incident of Second Italo-Ethiopian War that he struggled for independence. This church named after an Ark (tabot) carried during Battle of Adwa. It was once ruined by Fascist Italian government in 1937 but was immediately reconstructed after liberation of Ethiopia in 1941. The church, located at the northern end of Churchill Road—is unique octagonal architecture—has a museum of imperial weaponry including swords and tridents and giant helmets made from the manes of lions which was used during the Italian invasion. Holy Trinity Cathedral also sits in the city serving as the headquarters of the Ethiopian Orthodox Tewahedo Church. As the largest and highest cathedral in the country, Holy Trinity Cathedral was founded in commemoration of victory against the Italian invasion, and second most important place after the Church of Our Lady Mary of Zion in Axum. Before reign of Emperor Menelik II, the church was monastery. The church served burial of major prominent people in Ethiopia, also tombs of imperial family such as Haile Selassie and his wife Menen Asfaw, the third patriarch Abuna Tekle Haymanot and Abune Paulos. Former Ethiopian Prime Minister Meles Zenawi also interred to this church. Other include British Ethiopianist and suffragette Sylvia Pankhurst also entombed here. The Ba'etta Mariam Orthodox Church embodies Menelik Palace and Mausoleum and the biggest church around the place with smaller churches stand in front of it. It is frequently visited church. The other nearby church is Gebbi Gabriel which has unique decorated cross at the dome of the church and at its entrance.

Among mosques, the most notable is the Grand Anwar Mosque, which was located in Merkato, at the heart of the city. It was built in 1922 by the order of Italian government. Nur Mosque counted as an oldest Islamic temple recently rebuilt with Islamic architecture characterized by the use of domes, towers and piers.

== Architecture ==
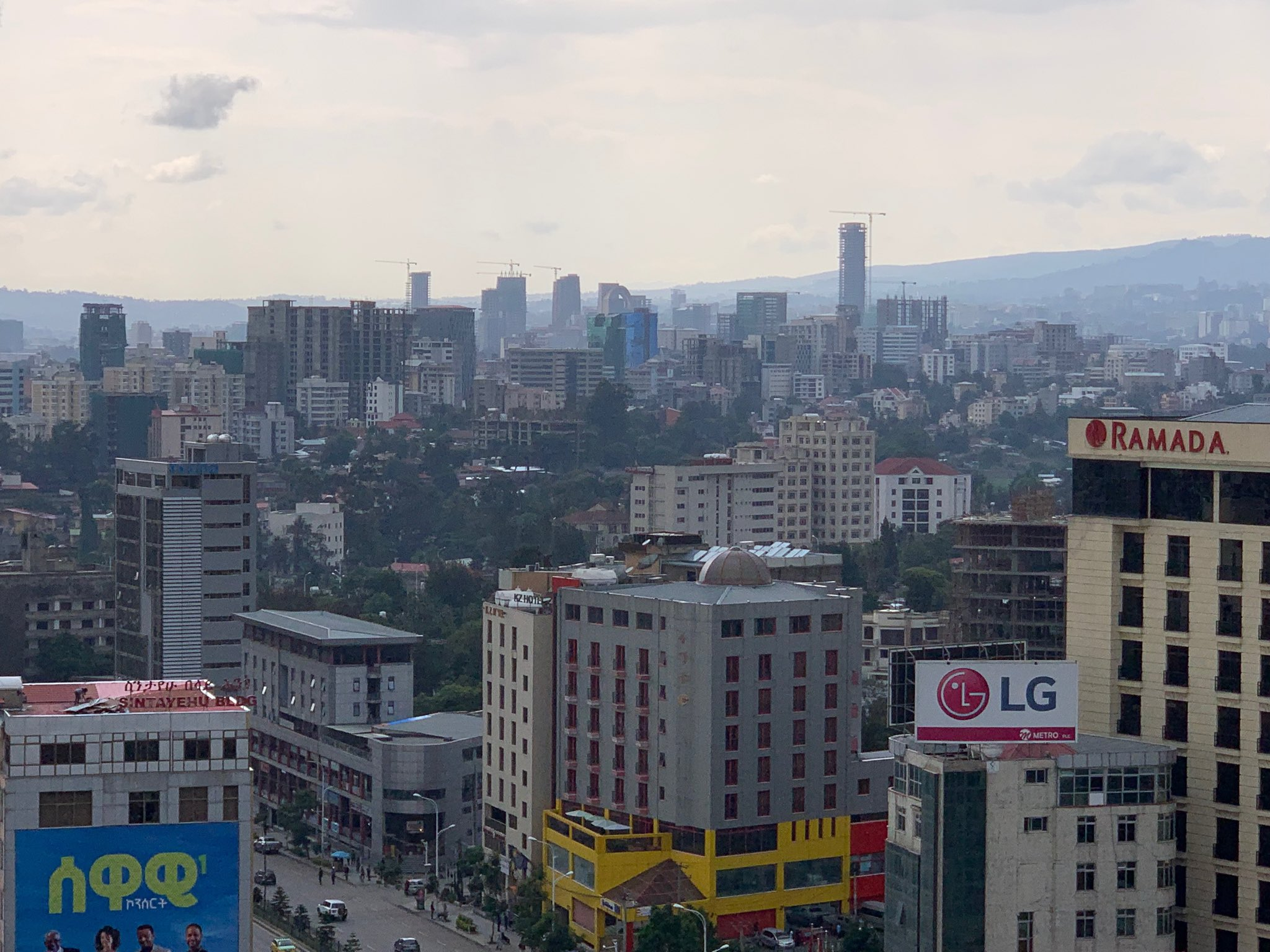
City view of Addis Ababa

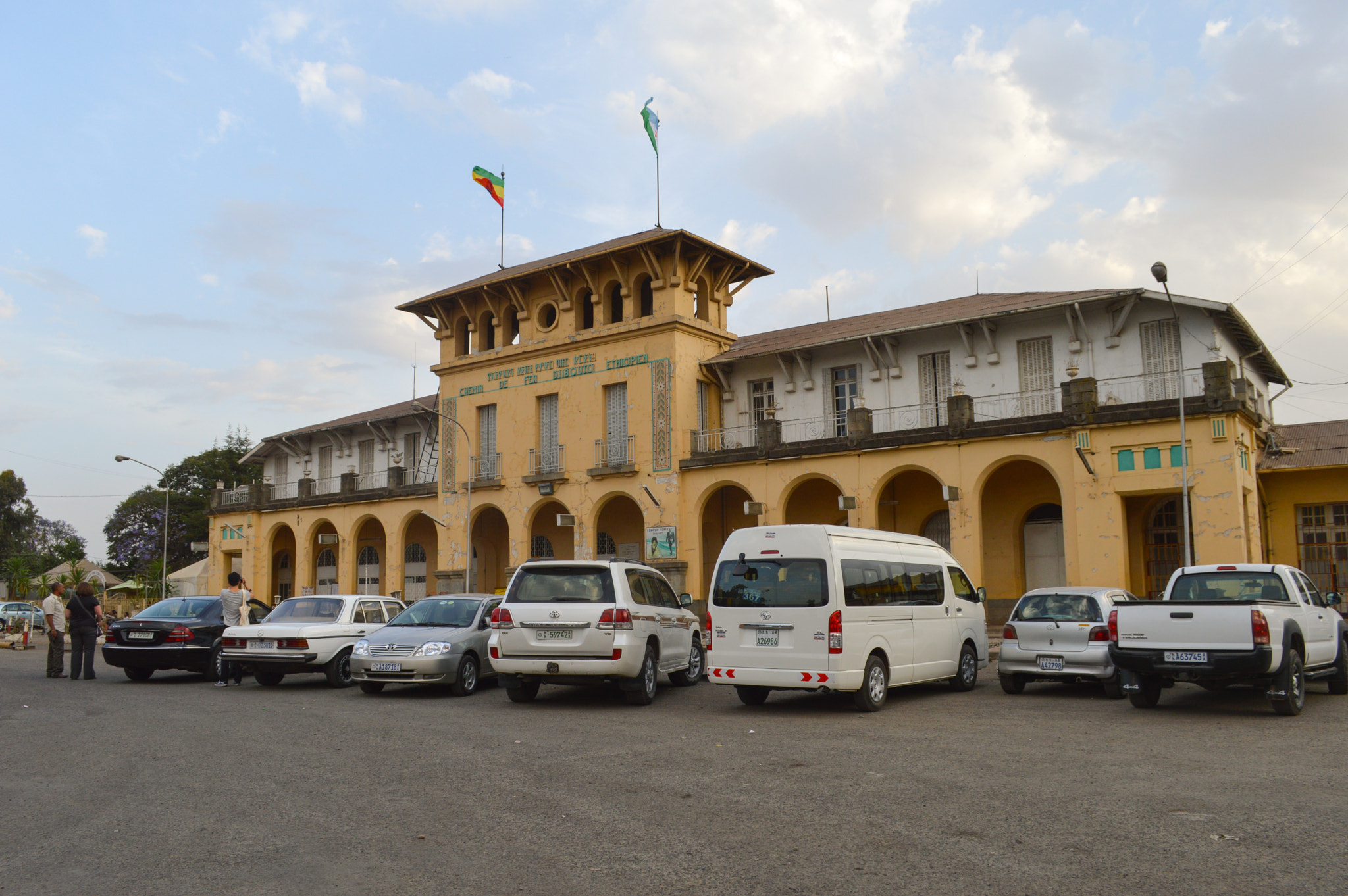
Old Train Station

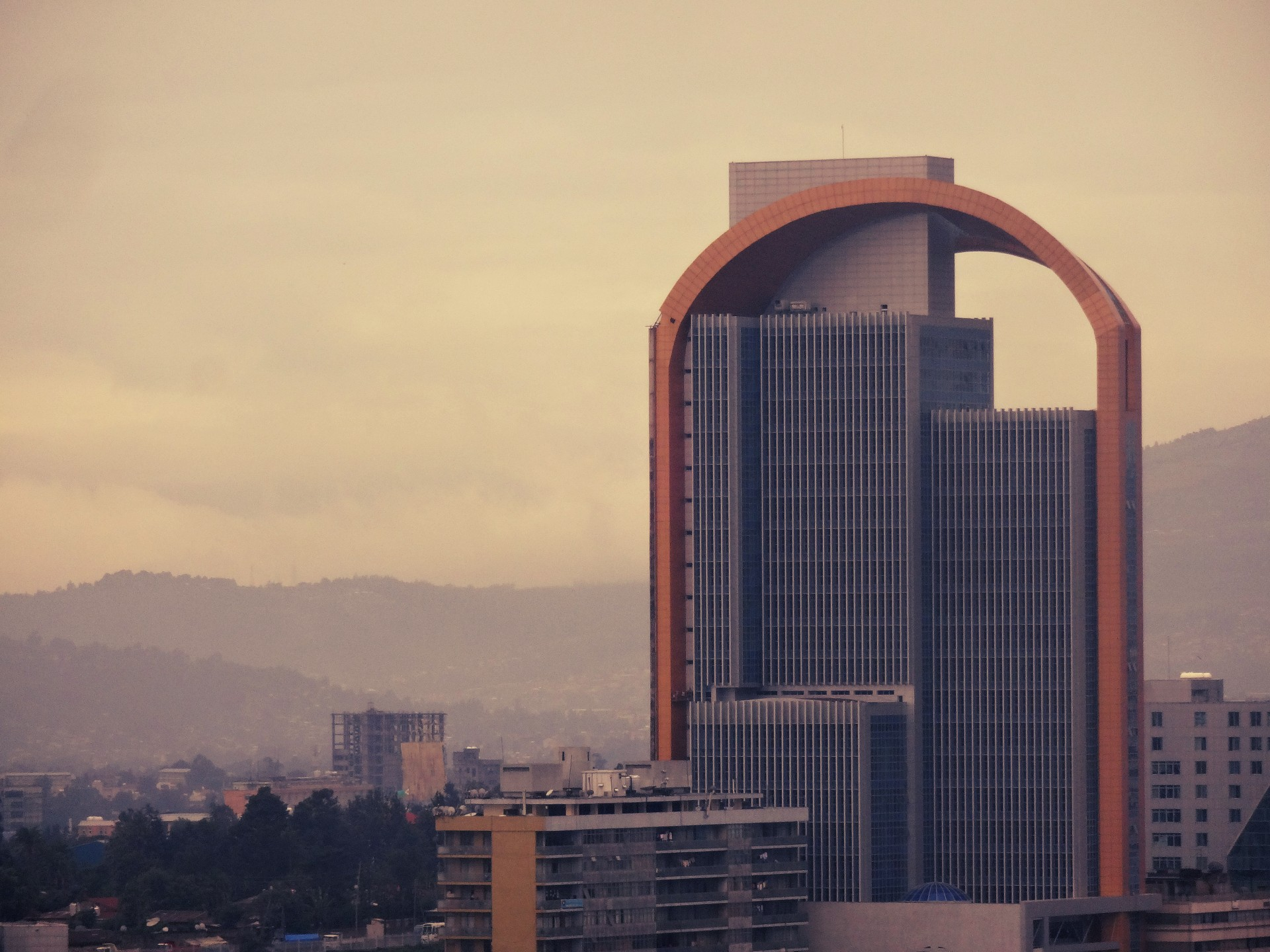
Wegagen Bank Headquarters

A financial district is under construction in Addis Ababa.

Former mayor Kuma Demeksa embarked on a quest to improve investment for the buildings in the city. Addis Ababa is the headquarters of the United Nations Economic Commission for Africa and the African Union.

Notable taller architecture in Addis Ababa includes the CBE headquarters, NIB international bank, Zemen bank, Hibret bank, Huda Tower, Nani Tower, Bank Misr Building, as well as the approved Angola World Trade Center Tower, Abyssinia Bank Tower, Mexico Square Tower, and the $200m AU Conference Center and Office Complex.

Notable buildings include St George's Cathedral (founded in 1896 and also home to a museum), Holy Trinity Cathedral (once the largest Ethiopian Orthodox Cathedral and the location of Sylvia Pankhurst's tomb) as well as the burial place of Emperor Haile Selassie and the Imperial family, and those who fought the Italian invasion during World War II.

In the Merkato district, which is the largest open market in Africa, is the Grand Anwar Mosque, the biggest mosque in Ethiopia built during the Italian occupation. A few meters to the southwest of the Anwar Mosque is the Raguel Church built after the liberation by Empress Menen. The proximity of the mosque and the church has symbolized the long peaceful relations between Christianity and Islam in Ethiopia. The Roman Catholic Cathedral of the Holy Family is also in the Merkato district. Near Bole International Airport is the new Medhane Alem (Savior of the World) Orthodox Cathedral, which is the second-largest in Africa.

The Entoto Mountains start among the northern suburbs. Suburbs of the city include Shiro Meda and Entoto in the north, Urael and Bole (home to Bole International Airport) in the east, Nifas Silk in the south-east, Mekanisa in the south, and Keraniyo and Kolfe in the west. Kolfe was mentioned in Nelson Mandela's Autobiography "A Long Walk to Freedom", as the place he got military training.

Addis Ababa has a distinct architectural style. Unlike many African cities, Addis Ababa was not built as a colonial settlement. This means that the city has not a European style of architecture. This changed with the Italian invasion of Ethiopia in 1936. The Piazza district in the city centre is the most evident indicator of Italian influence. The buildings are very much Italian in style and there are many Italian restaurants, as well as small cafes, and European-style shopping centres.

Parks include the Africa Park, which is situated along Menelik II Avenue and Unity Park at the Palace.

Other features of the city include the large Mercato market, the Jan Meda racecourse, Bihere Tsige Recreation Centre and a railway line to Djibouti.

The city is home to the Ethiopian National Library, the Ethiopian Ethnological Museum (and former Guenete Leul Palace), the Addis Ababa Museum, the Ethiopian Natural History Museum, the Ethiopian Railway Museum and National Postal Museum.

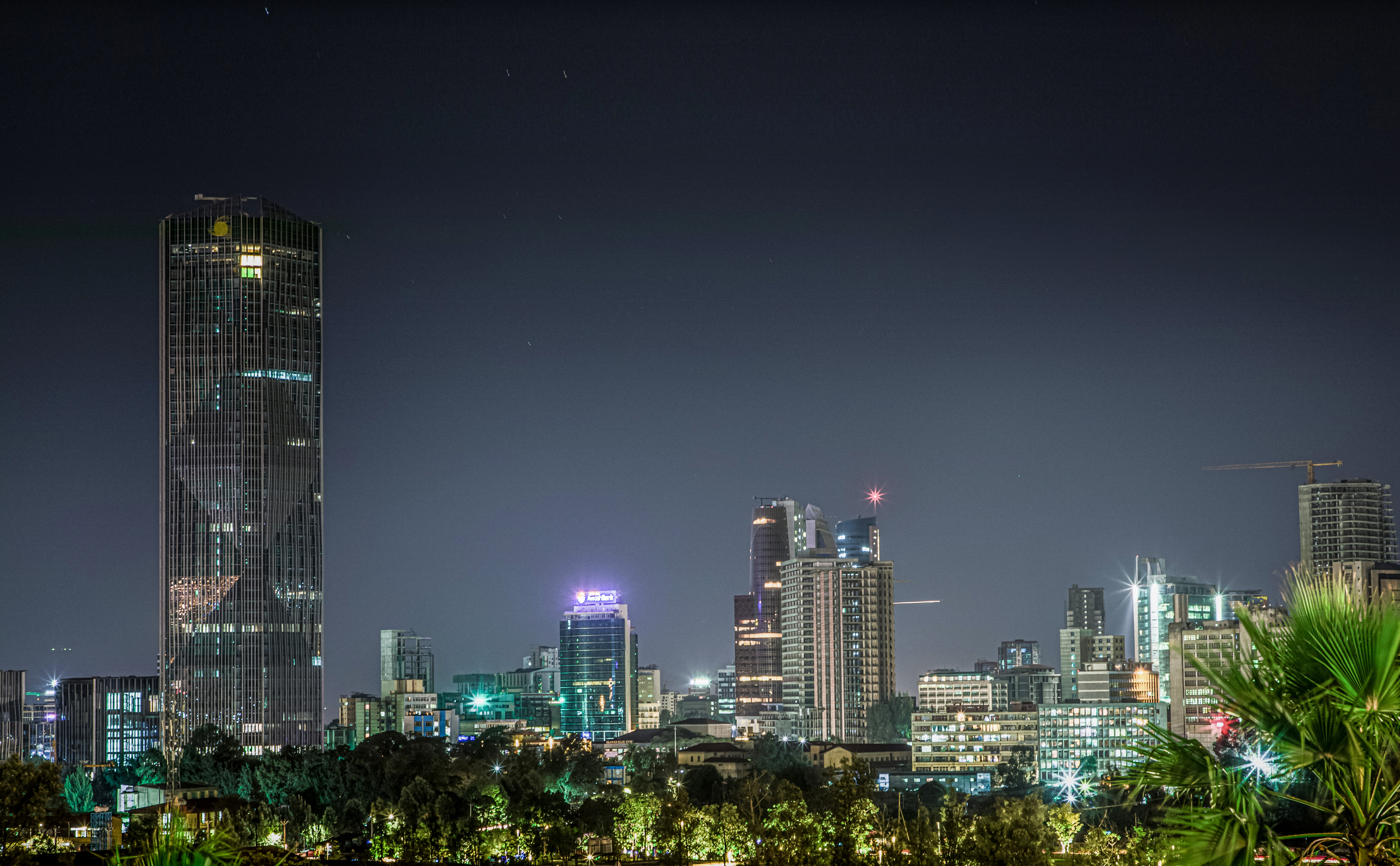
Addis Ababa skyline at night time, the Commercial Bank's Headquarters seen top left

There is also Menelik's old Imperial palace which remains the official seat of government, and the National Palace formerly known as the Jubilee Palace (built to mark Emperor Haile Selassie's Silver Jubilee in 1955) which is the residence of the President of Ethiopia. Jubilee Palace was also modelled after Buckingham Palace in the United Kingdom. Africa Hall is located across Menelik II avenue from this Palace and is where the United Nations Economic Commission for Africa is headquartered as well as most UN offices in Ethiopia. It is also the site of the founding of the Organisation of African Unity (OAU), which eventually became the African Union (AU). The African Union is now housed in a new headquarters built on the site of the demolished Akaki Prison, on land donated by Ethiopia for this purpose in the southwestern part of the city. The Hager Fikir Theatre, the oldest theatre in Ethiopia, is located in the Piazza district. Near Holy Trinity Cathedral is the art deco Parliament building, built during the reign of Emperor Haile Selassie, with its clock tower. It continues to serve as the seat of Parliament today. Across from the Parliament is the Shengo Hall, built by the Derg regime of Mengistu Haile Mariam as its new parliament hall. The Shengo Hall was the world's largest pre-fabricated building, which was constructed in Finland before being assembled in Addis Ababa. It is used for large meetings and conventions. Itegue Taitu Hotel, built-in 1898 (Ethiopian Calendar) in the middle of the city (Piazza), was the first hotel in Ethiopia.

Meskel Square is one of the noted squares in the city, serving as the site for the annual Meskel at the end of September annually when thousands gather in celebration.

The fossilized skeleton and a plaster replica of the early hominid Lucy (known in Ethiopia as Dinkinesh) is preserved at the National Museum of Ethiopia.

== Culture ==
Addis Ababa is a melting pot of different communities throughout the country's regions, along with Dire Dawa. In Addis Ababa, cultural assimilation is ubiquitous and widely known.

=== Arts and museums ===
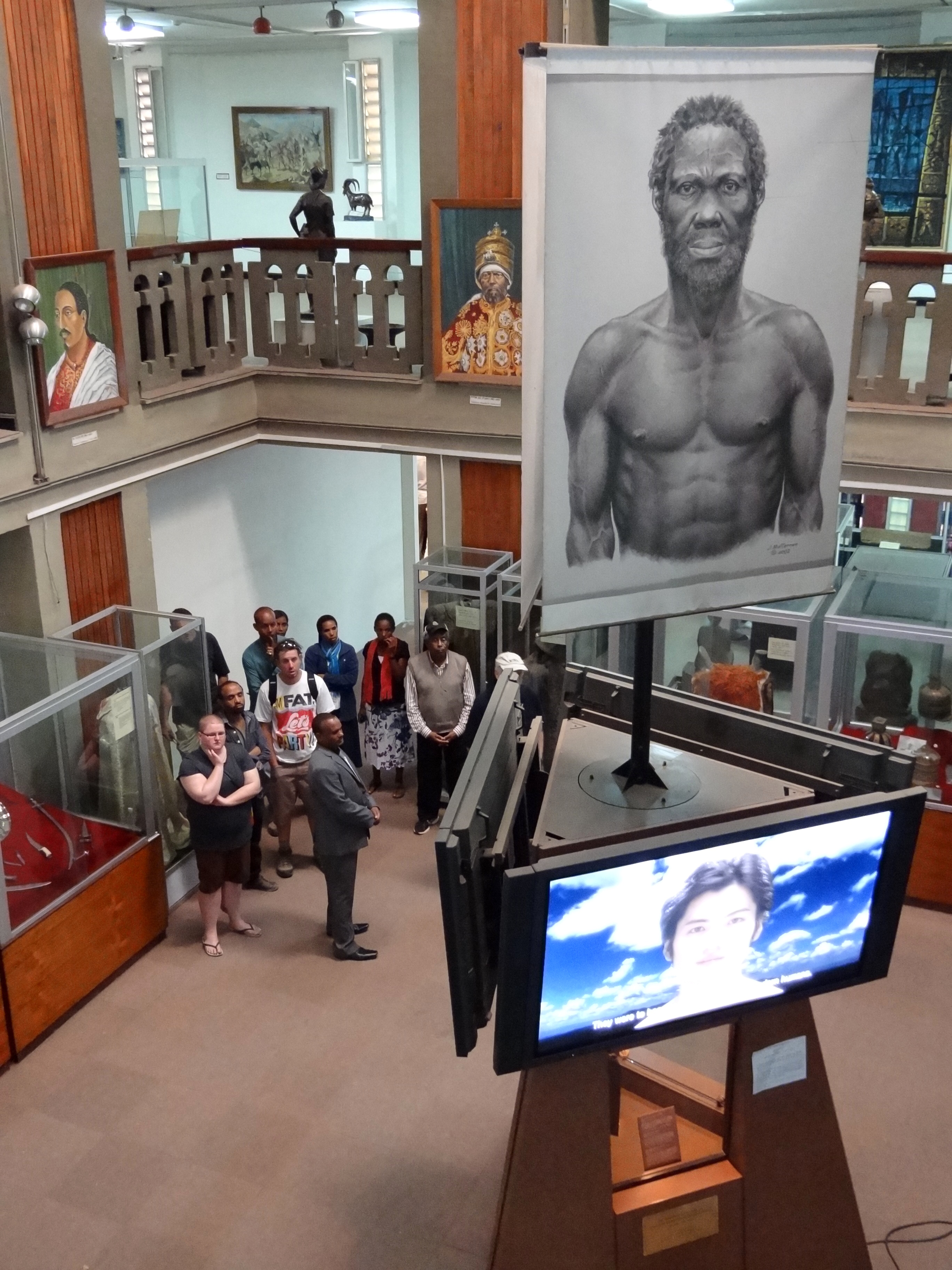
Central Exhibition Hall at National Museum of Ethiopia

The National Museum of Ethiopia hosts many artifacts and artistic treasures in Ethiopia. It is also home of archaeological exhibition. The partial specimen of Australopithecus afarensis, and its successor Selam are noteworthy among viewed galleries in the museum. The museum also has wide-range ceremonial costumes of Solomonic dynasty, which was initiated in 1936. Arts include mostly works of Afewerk Tekle, one of the most renowned gallery, and the depiction of meeting between Solomon and Queen of Sheba.

=== Theatres and cinemas ===
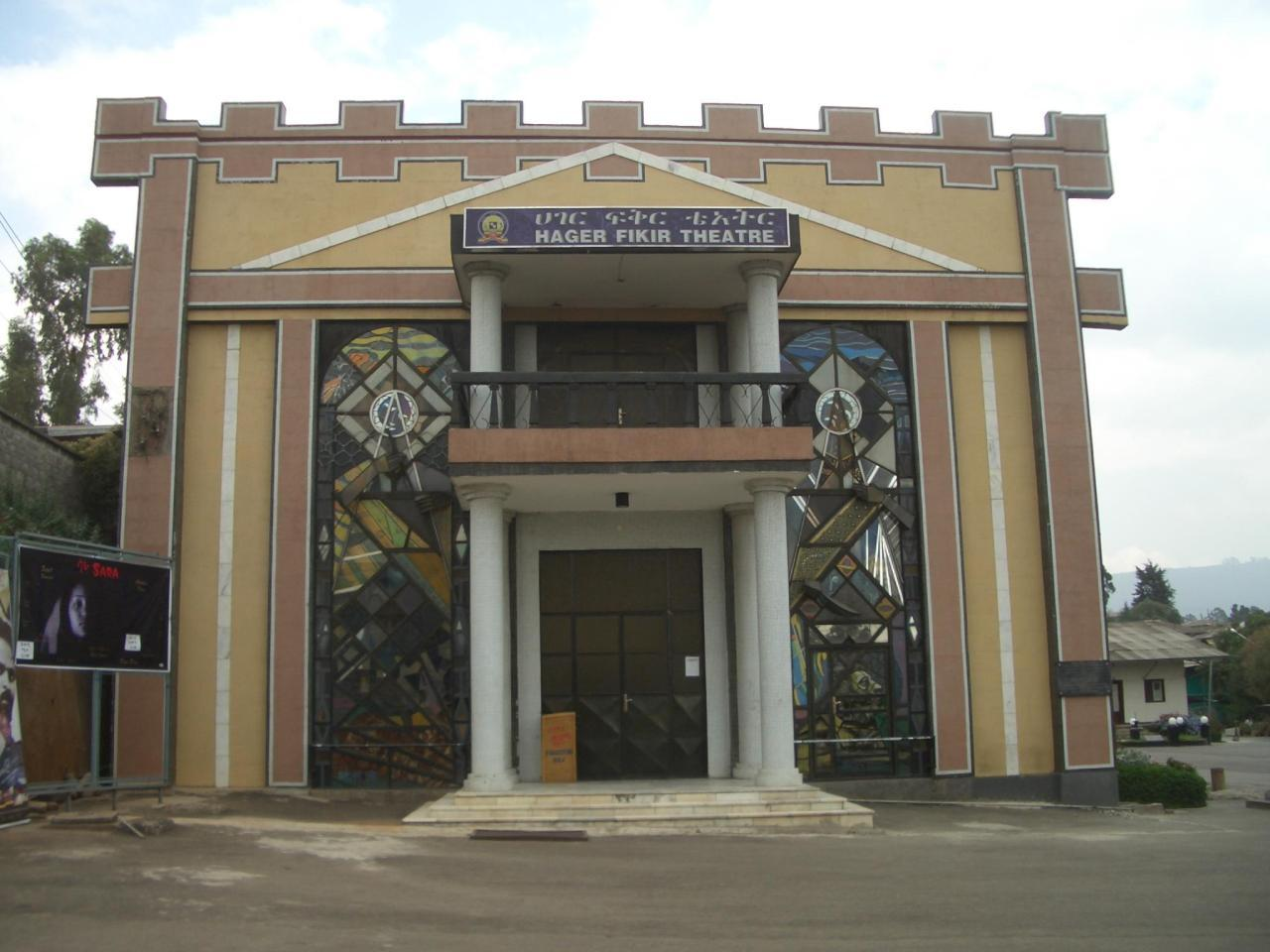
Hager Fikir Theatre in April 2006

The Ethiopian National Theatre entrance

Addis Ababa is home of many theatres, including the long run Hager Fikir Theatre, which served many prominent figures performance. In addition, the Ethiopian National Theatre is also located in the city's hub. It was founded by Emperor Haile Selassie in 1955, who eponymously renamed it. Historically, the Amhara culture dominated the country's art scene; rituals connected to priesthood based on Coptic church, most often using improvised art such as shinsheba and qene.

Tekle Hawariat introduced modern European dramas based on La Fontaine's fable around 1916. Mattewos Bekele and Iyoel Yohannes became famous playwright, and Makonnen Endalkachew's David and Orion and King David III was renowned by that time. In the Derg era, propagandic communist pieces often conceded and several new theatres were opened until the successive government under EPRDF altered new form of cultural life with continuation of development.

Notable modern cinemas including:

- Children Youth Theatre
- Agona Cinema
- Haile & Alem Inter
- Cinema Yoftahe
- Sebastopol
- Matin Multiplex

=== Science and technology ===
There are variety of scientific and research institutes in Addis Ababa. The Addis Ababa Science and Technology University has a goal of to bring "Ethiopia economically and industrialized state". The university was founded in 2011 under Directive of the Council of Ministers No. 216/2011. The city is home of various scientific organizations notably the Science and Technology Information Center. Addis Ababa has a science museum built by MadaTech's exhibition crew. The national museum is 250 square feet with 30 interactive images of scientific objects. The museum was launched by Jewish-American businessman Mark Gelfand, who spent his money more than in MadaTech and sought resurrection of science museum in all over of the world. Some prominent facilities of scientific and technology include the Ethiopian Biotechnology Institute, while the National Intelligence and Security Service also headquartered in Addis Ababa responsible for upholding national security of the country.

=== Media ===
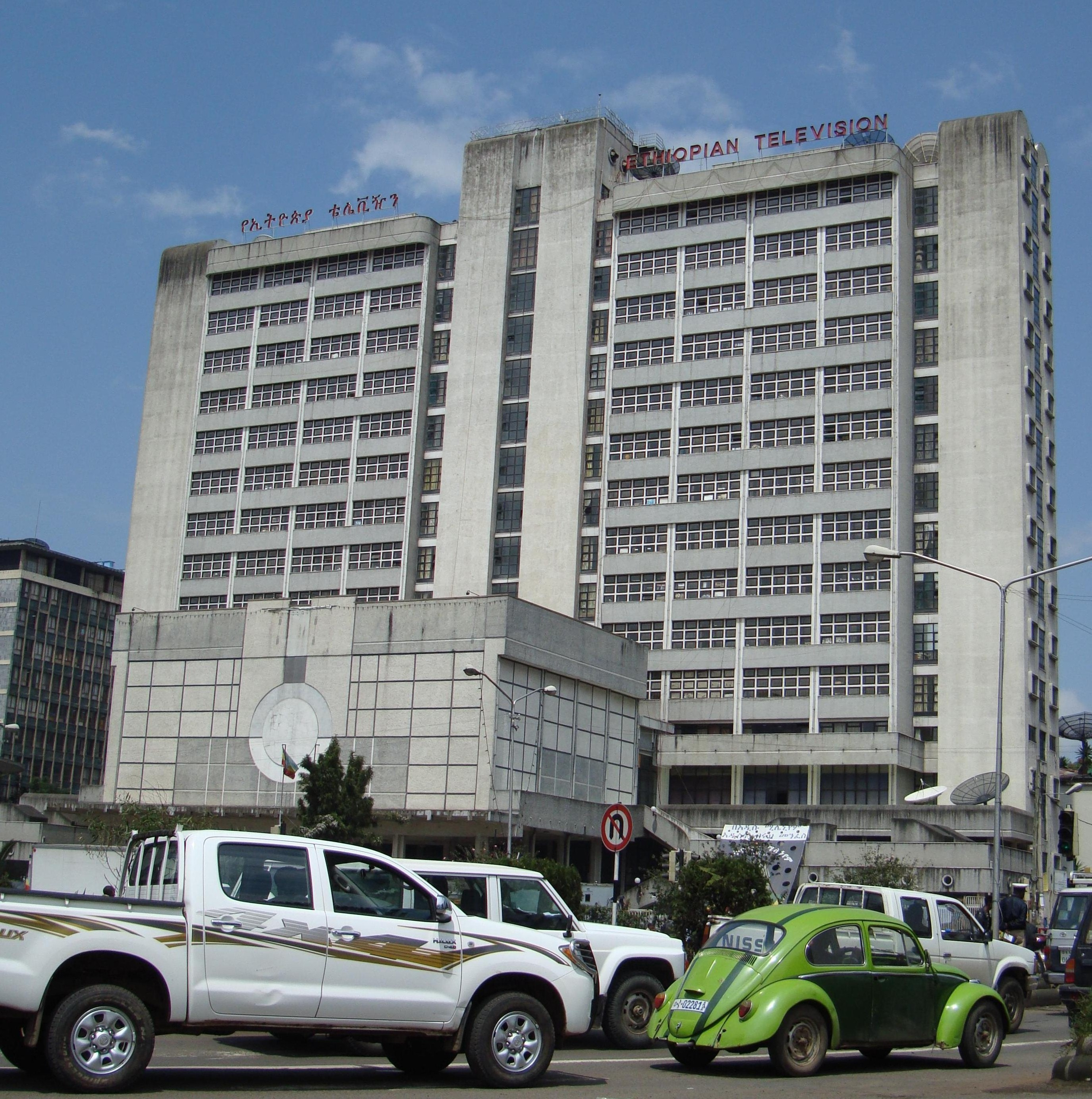
The Ethiopian Broadcasting Corporation headquarters in Addis Ababa

Addis Ababa has the largest mass media concentration in the country. Radio stations generally state-owned with 50 community licensed by the Ethiopian Broadcasting Authority, with four licensing opts for 29 local languages. The Ethiopian Broadcasting Corporation is a public broadcaster which has its headquarters in Addis Ababa. Private television commenced with the launch of EBS TV in 2008, and many private channels grew in the beginning of 2016. For example, Kana TV, Fana TV, LTV and JTV Ethiopia. As of October 2016, the Ethiopian Broadcasting Agency licensed with Fana Broadcasting Corporate, Walta Information Center and Arki Broadcasting Service and Ed Stelar Training as commercial FM stations. There were reached eight analogue and nine television stations in Ethiopia. Nine stations were available in Addis Ababa and were public owned.

== Sport ==
Addis Ababa serves major sporting events, notably the Jan Meda International Cross Country. It hosts four races, with senior and junior (under-20) for both sexes. The city is known for annual 10 km road event called the Great Ethiopian Run, created by athlete Haile Gebrselassie, Peter Middlebrook and Abi Masefield in late October 2000. Yet, course records were broken by Deriba Merga (28:18.61 in 2006) and Yalemzerf Yehualaw (31:55 in 2019) of both men and women respectively.

Addis Ababa is home to Addis Ababa Stadium, Abebe Bikila Stadium, named after Shambel Abebe Bikila, and Nyala Stadium. The 2008 African Championships in Athletics were held in Addis Ababa.

== Education ==
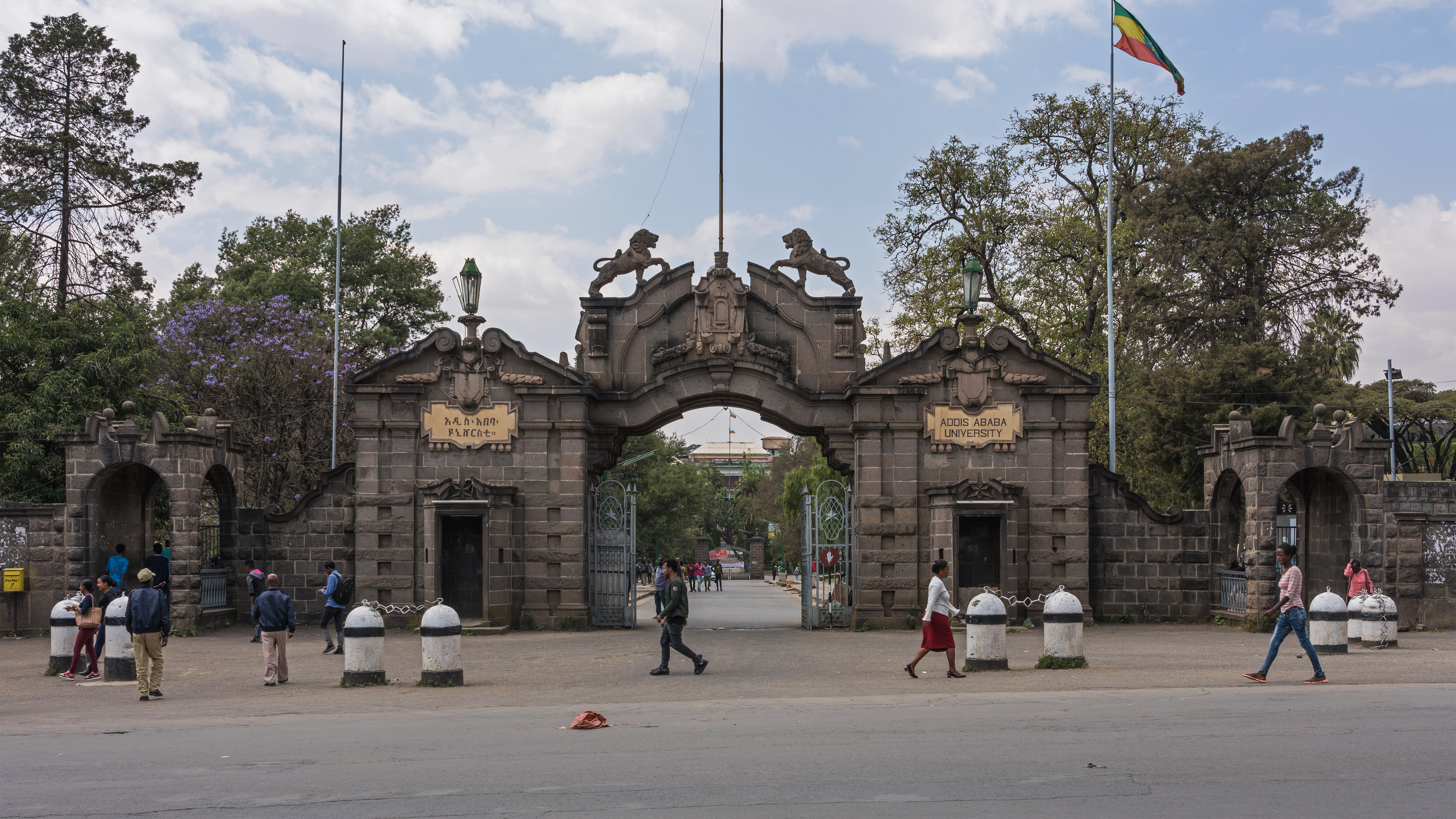
Addis Ababa University

Emperor Menelik II introduced modern secular education to Addis Ababa in the early 20th century, a significant shift from the centuries-old education system dominated by the Ethiopian Orthodox Church. In 1906, he opened the first public school in the city. While Menelik faced disapproval from the some who were accustomed to traditional educational practices, the Emperor encouraged the expansion of educational institutions and even went as far as preparing legislation to make school attendance compulsory for boys over 12 years old.

Addis Ababa University was founded in 1950 and was originally named "University College of Addis Ababa", then renamed in 1962 for the former Ethiopian emperor Haile Selassie I who had donated his Genete Leul Palace to be the university's main campus in the previous year. It is the home of the Institute of Ethiopian Studies and the Ethnological Museum. The city also has numerous public universities and private colleges including Addis Ababa Science and Technology University, Ethiopian Civil Service University, Admas University College, St. Mary's University, Unity University, Kotebe Metropolitan University and Rift Valley University.

In May 2002, a businesswoman named Zemi Yenus created a school for children with autism in the city, called the Joy Center. Within two years, it was moved to a larger building.

In 2022 the new Abrehot Library was completed on former parkland opposite the Parliament Building, becoming the largest library in Ethiopia. Research indicates that the increase in Addis Ababa's private education sector is a result of the demand for quality education. In 2002/2003, privately owned schools accounted for 98%, 78%, 53%, 41%, and 67% of preschool, primary, secondary, technical and vocational, and college institutions, respectively, compared to a survey from 1994. However, adequate school enrollment is often problematic, as parents frequently prefer to enroll their children in private schools rather than government-run institutions. Private primary schools tend to be more successful in terms of resourcing, business and financial management, and educational protocols, as they often have less bureaucratic administrations.

Growth of Private schools
School level	Year	
School level	1994/95	2001/02
Kindergarten (KGs)	52	292
Primary schools	–	287
Secondary schools	5	31
TVET schools	0	7
Colleges	0	10

== Transport ==
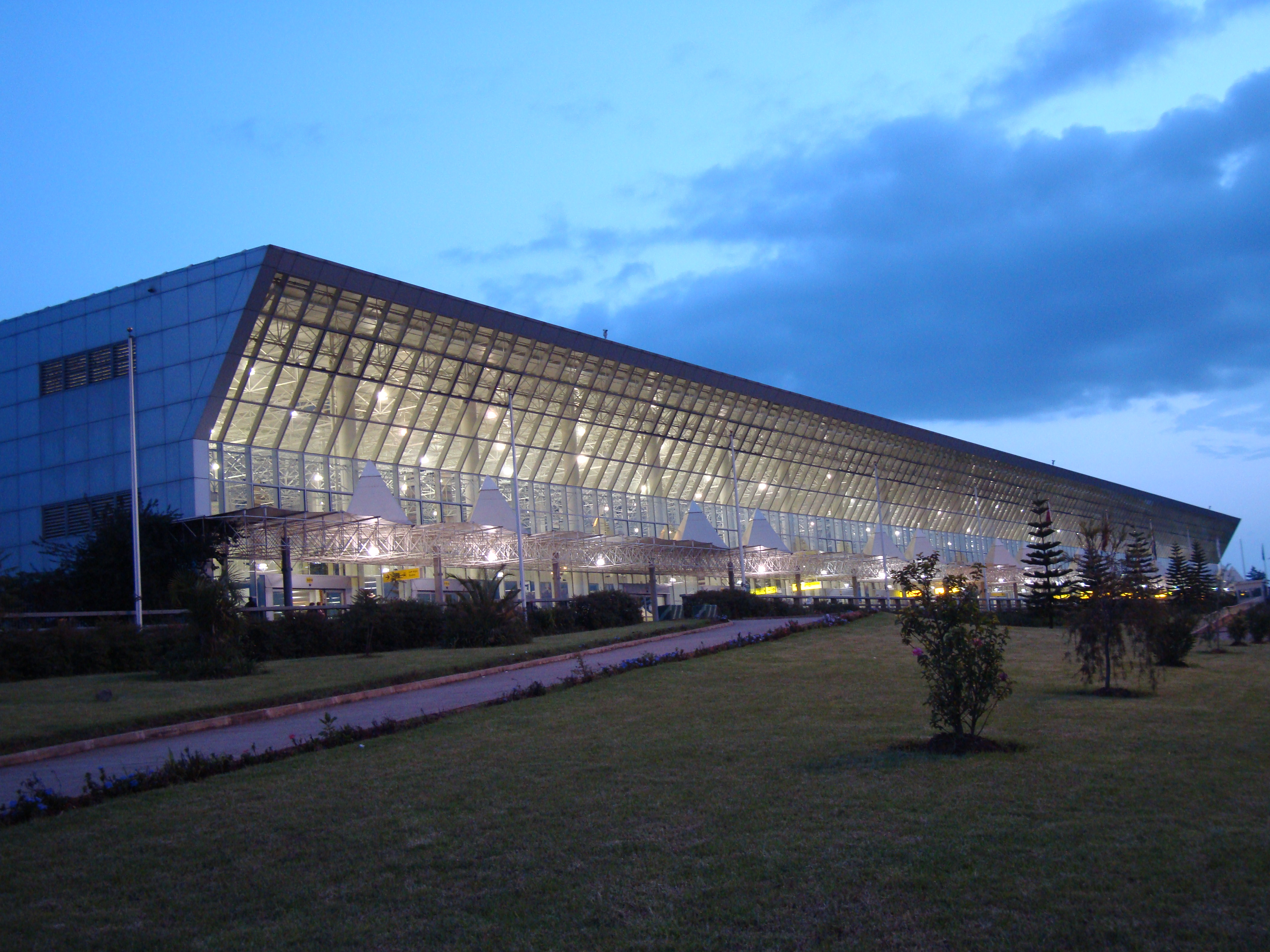
Bole International Airport

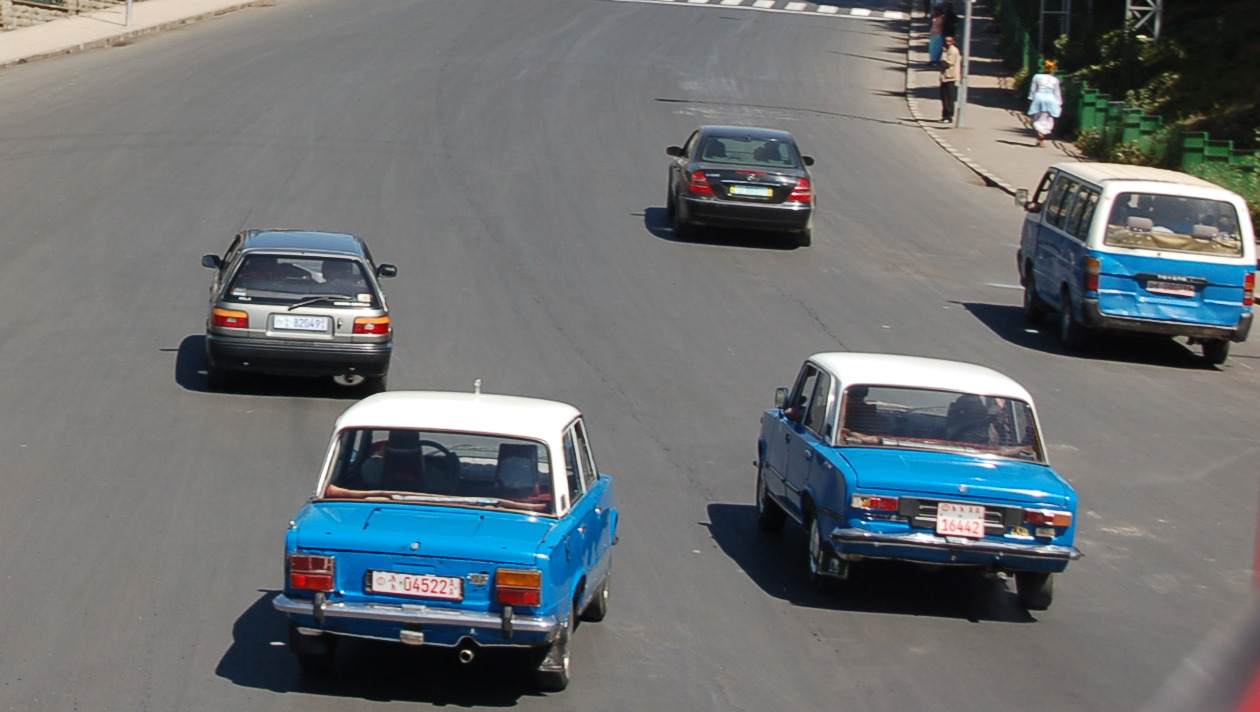
Blue and white taxi used to be the main public transport in Addis Ababa but now most of them are replaced with ride-hailing companies and those cabs have various colors.

Public transport is through public buses from three different companies (Anbessa City Bus Service Enterprise, Sheger, Alliance), light rail or blue and white taxis. The taxis are usually minibuses that can seat at most twelve people, which follow somewhat pre-defined routes. The minibus taxis are typically operated by two people, the driver and a weyala who collects fares and calls out the taxi's destination. Sedan taxis work like normal taxis and are driven to the desired destination on demand. In recent years, new taxi companies have appeared, which use other designs, including one large company using yellow sedan taxis and a few ride-hailing companies (Ride taxi, Feres, etc.) have become widely accessible in the city.

=== Road ===
The construction of the Addis Ababa Ring Road was initiated in 1998 to implement the city master plan and enhance peripheral development. The Ring Road was divided into three major phases that connect all the five main gates in and out of Addis Ababa with all other regions (Jimma, Bishoftu, Dessie, Gojjam and Ambo). For this project, China Road and Bridge Corporation (CRBC) was the partner of Addis Ababa City Roads Authority (AACRA). The Ring Road has greatly helped to decongest and alleviate city traffic.

Intercity bus service is provided by the Lion City Bus Services.

=== Air ===
The city is served by Addis Ababa Bole International Airport, where a new terminal opened in 2003.

=== Railway ===
Addis Ababa originally had a railway connection with Djibouti City, with a picturesque French-style railway station, but this route has been abandoned. The new Addis Ababa-Djibouti Railway started operation in September 2016, running parallel to the route of the original railway line.

=== Light rail ===
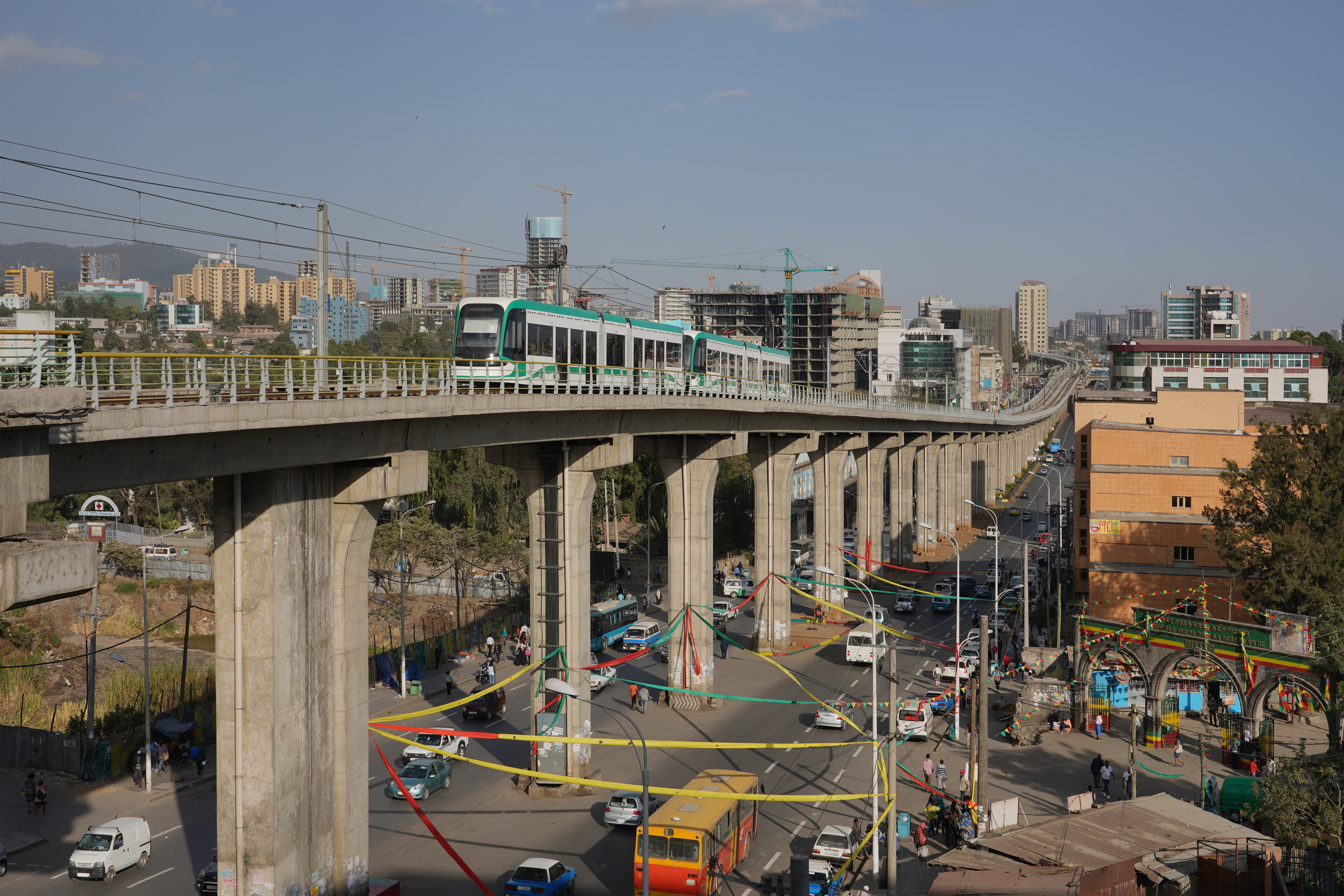
Addis Ababa Light Rail is the first light rail in sub-Saharan Africa

Addis Ababa opened its light rail system to the public on 20 September 2015. The system is the first of its kind in sub-Saharan Africa.

The Ethiopian Railway Corporation reached a funding agreement worth millions of dollars with the Export and Import Bank of China in September 2010 and the light rail project was completed in January 2015. The route is a 34.25-kilometre (21.28 mi) network with two lines; the operational line running from the centre to the south of the city. Upon completion, the east–west line will run from Ayat to the Torhailoch ring-road, and from Menelik Square to Merkato Bus Station, Meskel Square and Akaki.

== Twin towns – sister cities ==
Addis Ababa is twinned with:

- Ankara, Turkey
- Baku, Azerbaijan
- Beersheba, Israel
- Beijing, China
- Chuncheon, South Korea
- Harare, Zimbabwe
- Johannesburg, South Africa
- Khartoum, Sudan
- Kuala Lumpur, Malaysia
- Leipzig, Germany
- Lusaka, Zambia
- Lyon, France
- Nairobi, Kenya
- Washington, D.C., United States
- Windhoek, Namibia

== Gallery ==
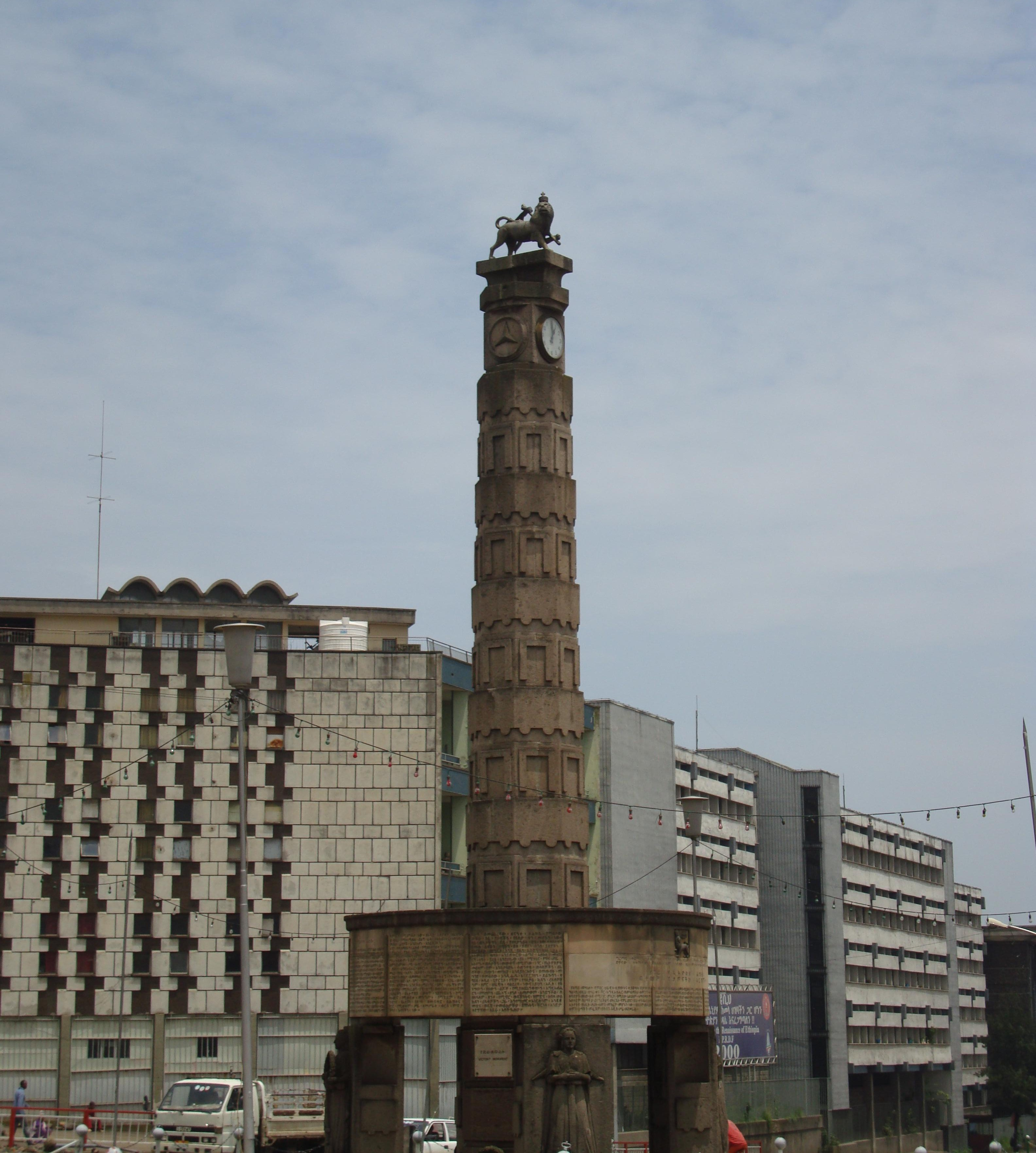
Arat Kilo monument

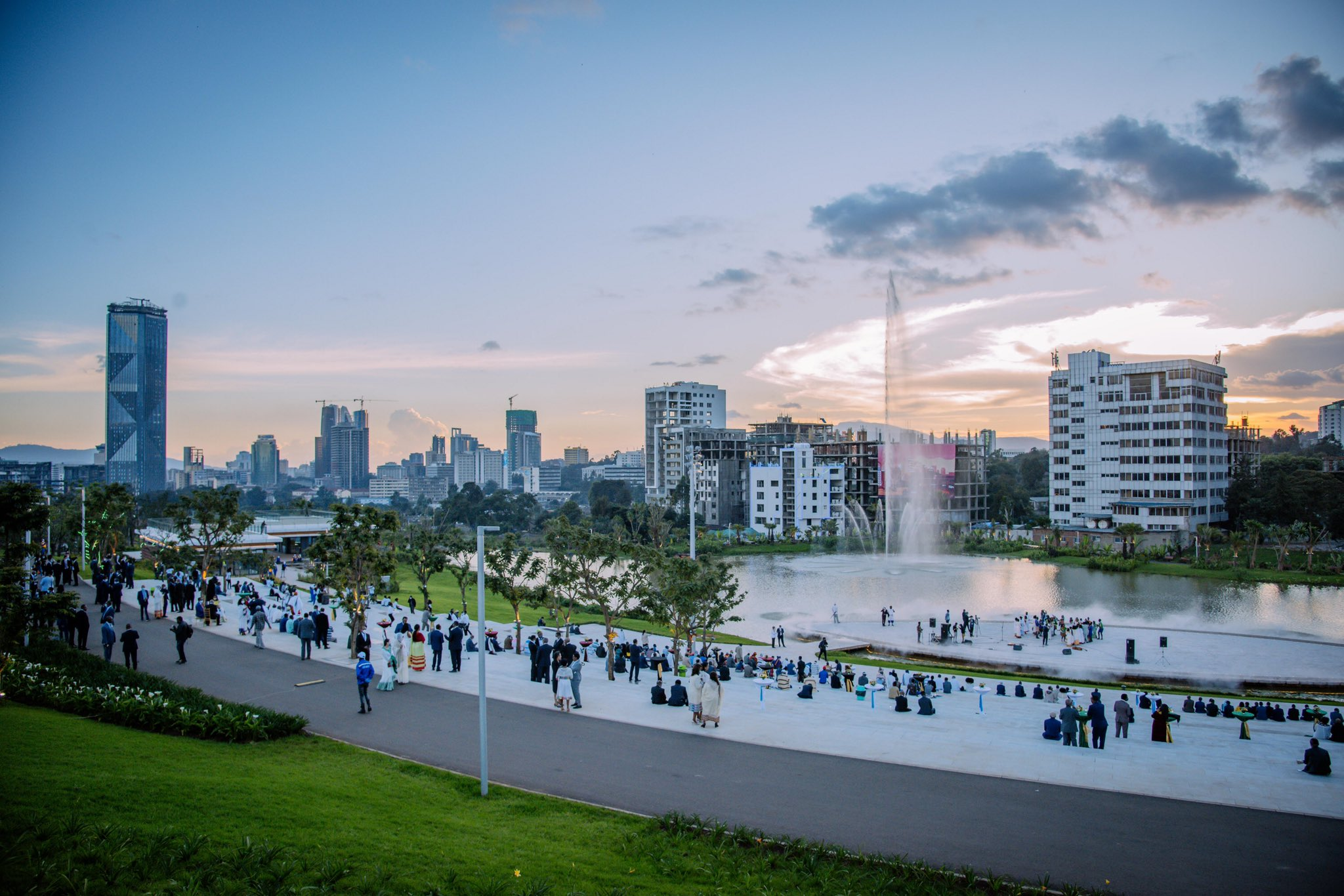
Addis Ababa Sheger Park

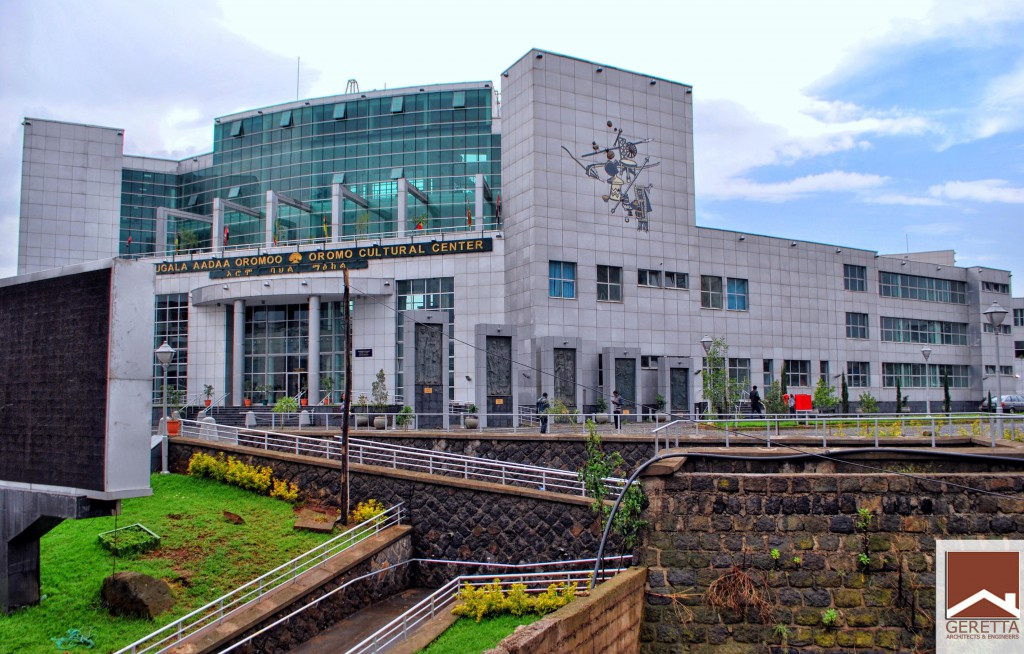
Oromia Cultural Center in Addis Ababa

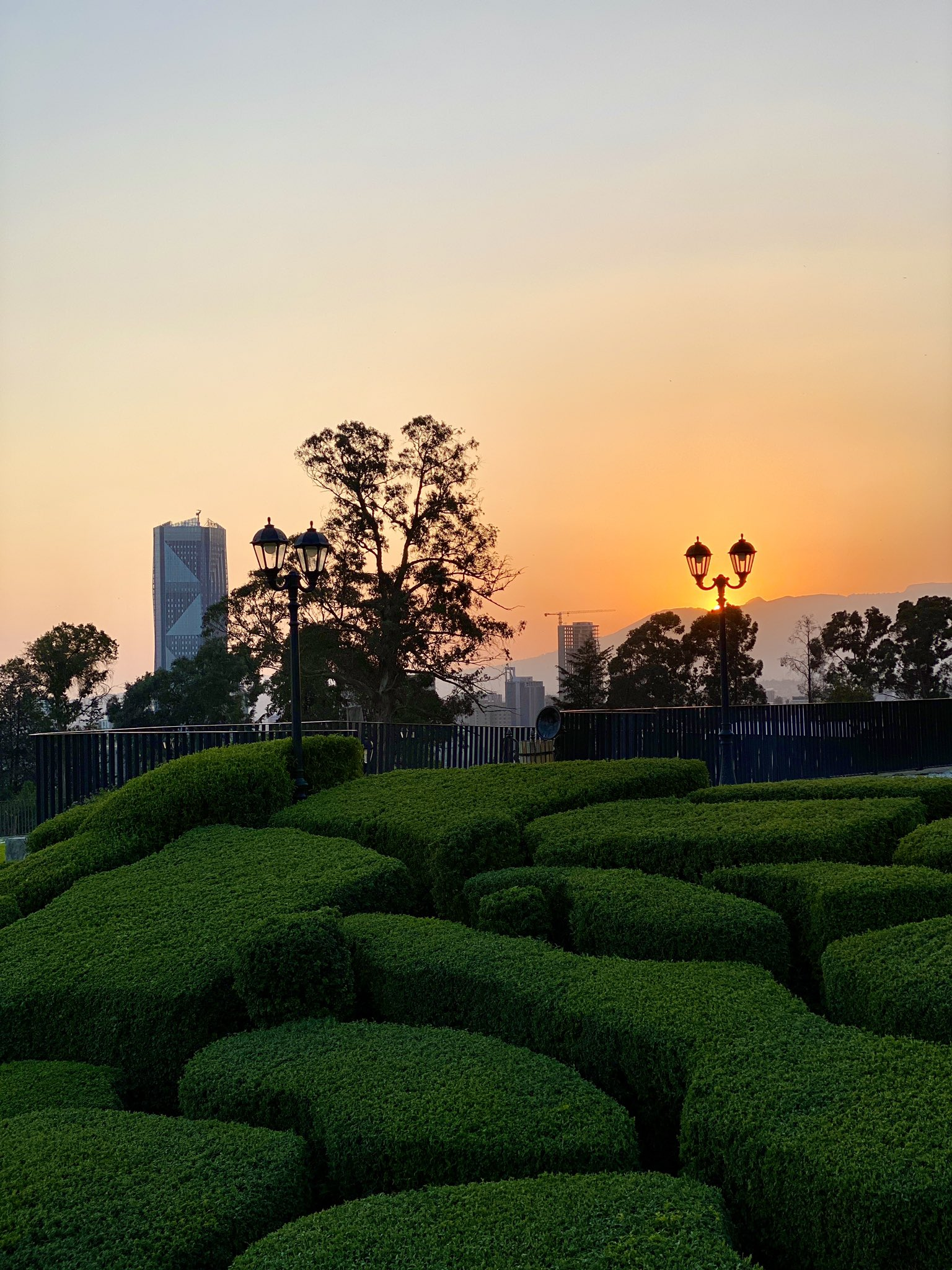
Unity Park Addis Ababa

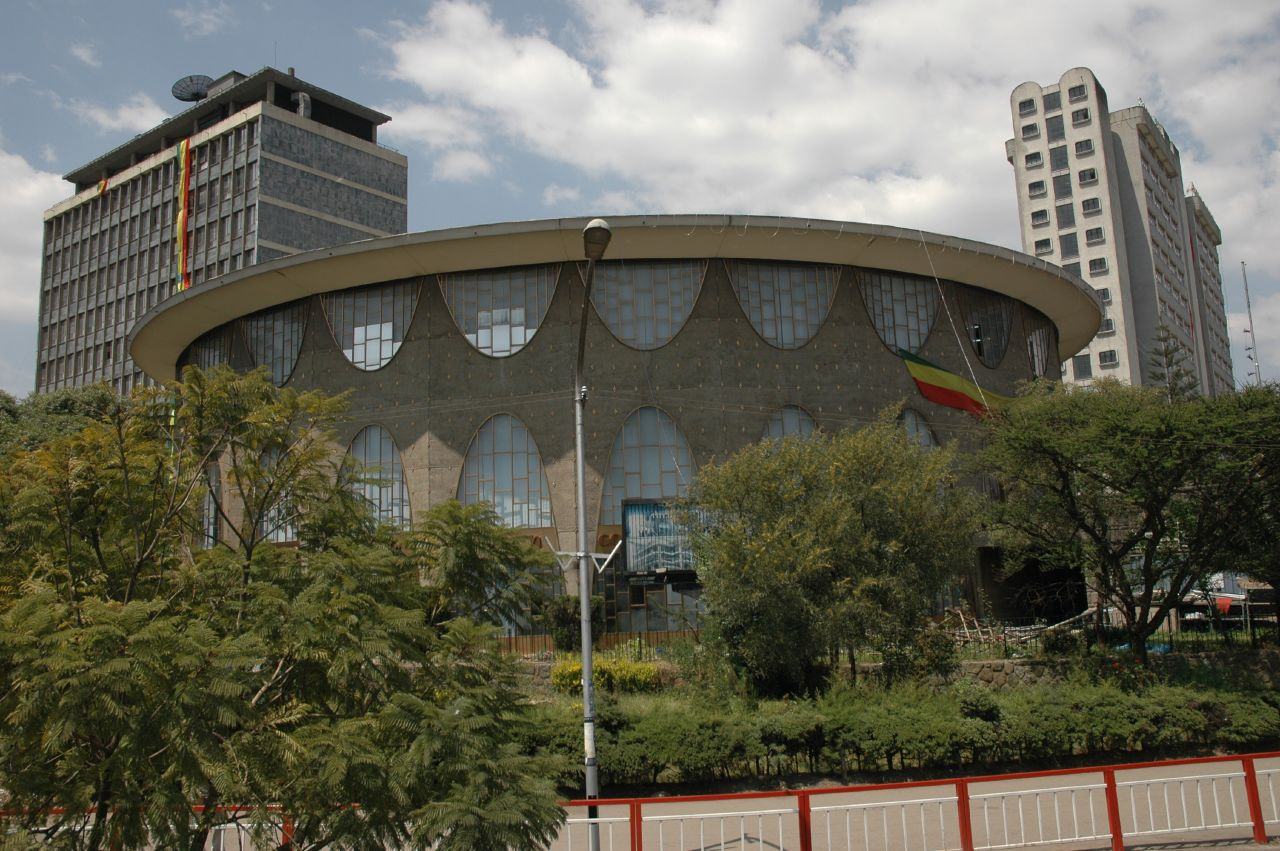
Commercial Bank of Ethiopia

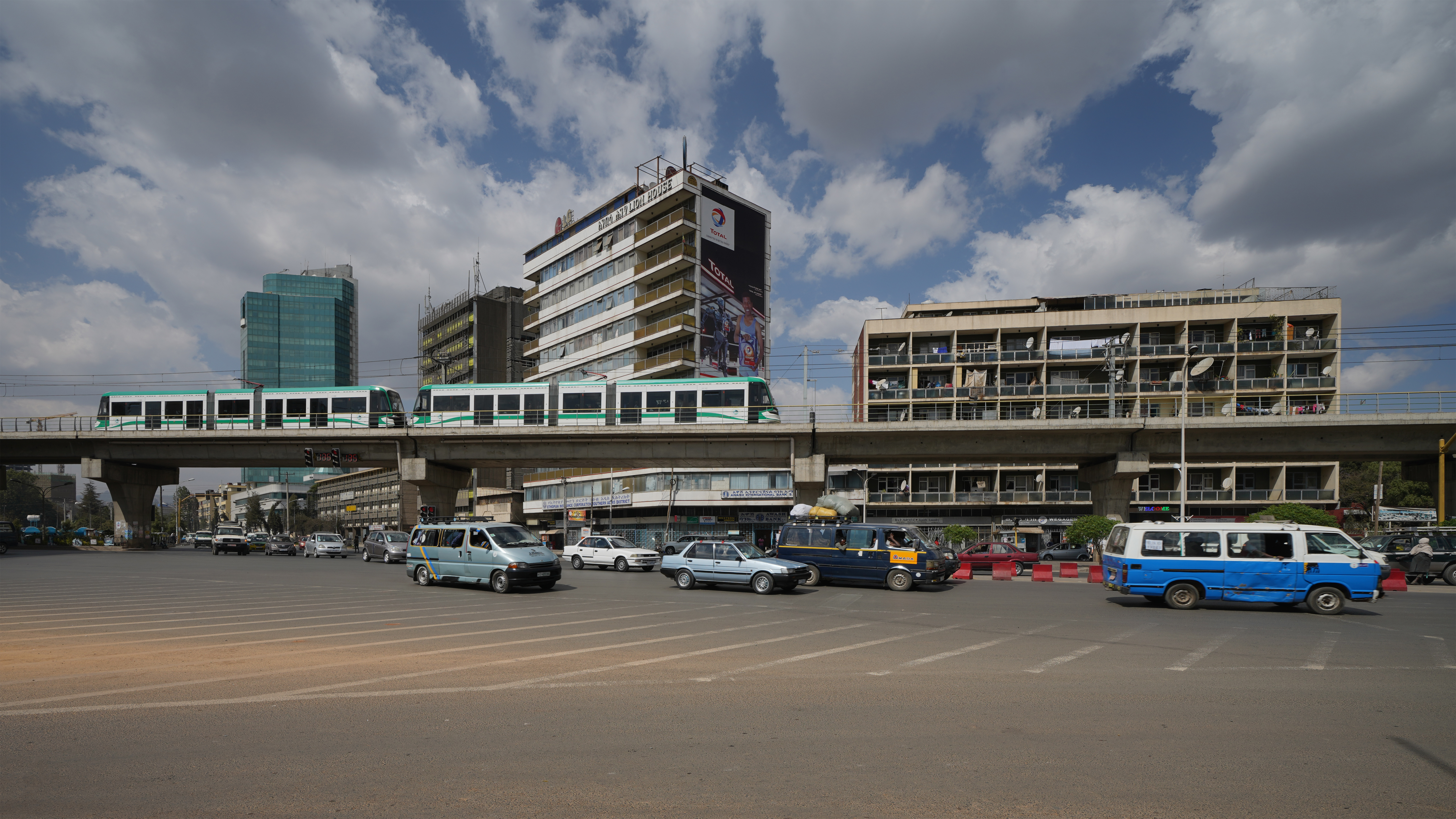
Meskel Square

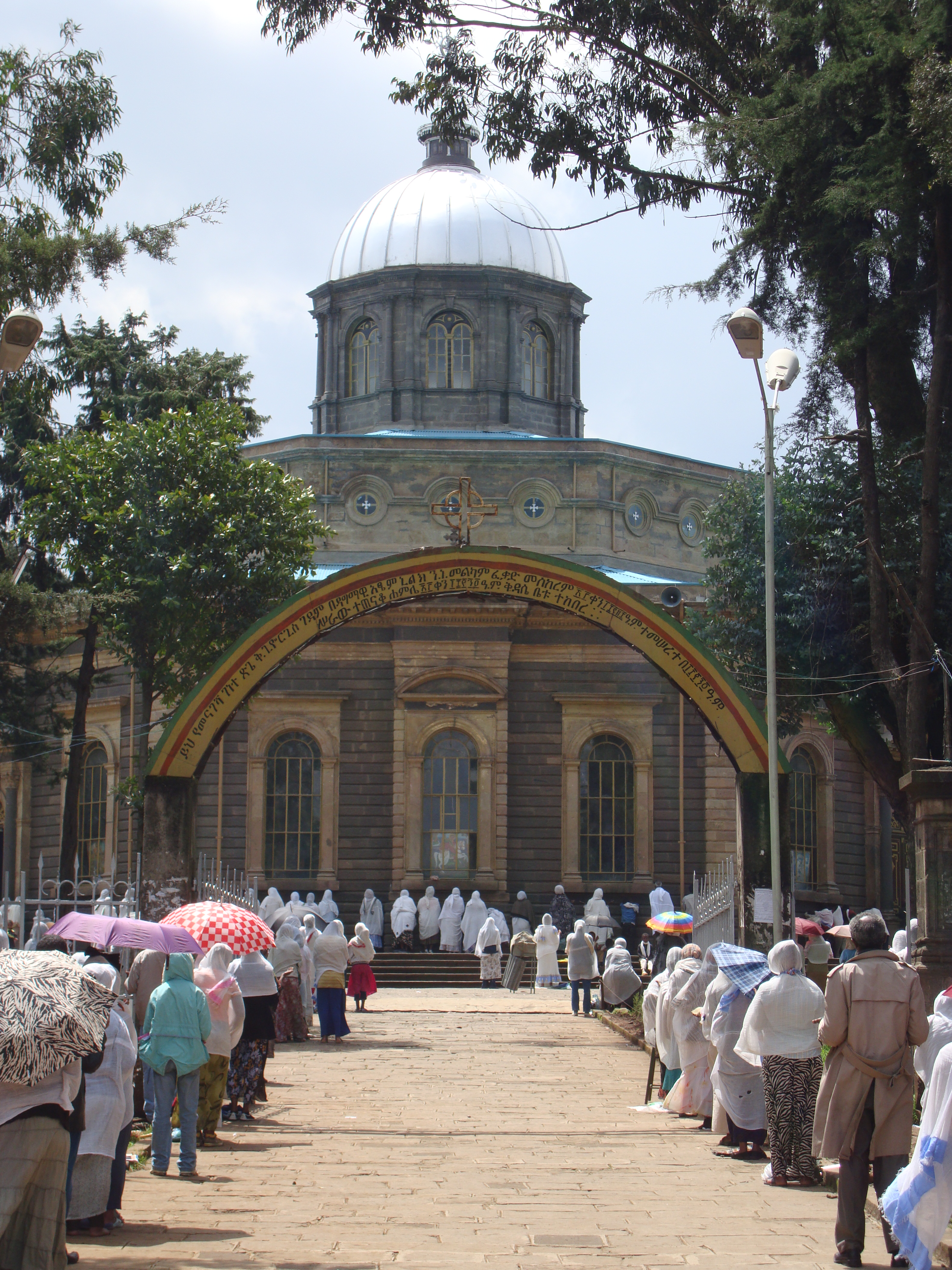
St George's Cathedral

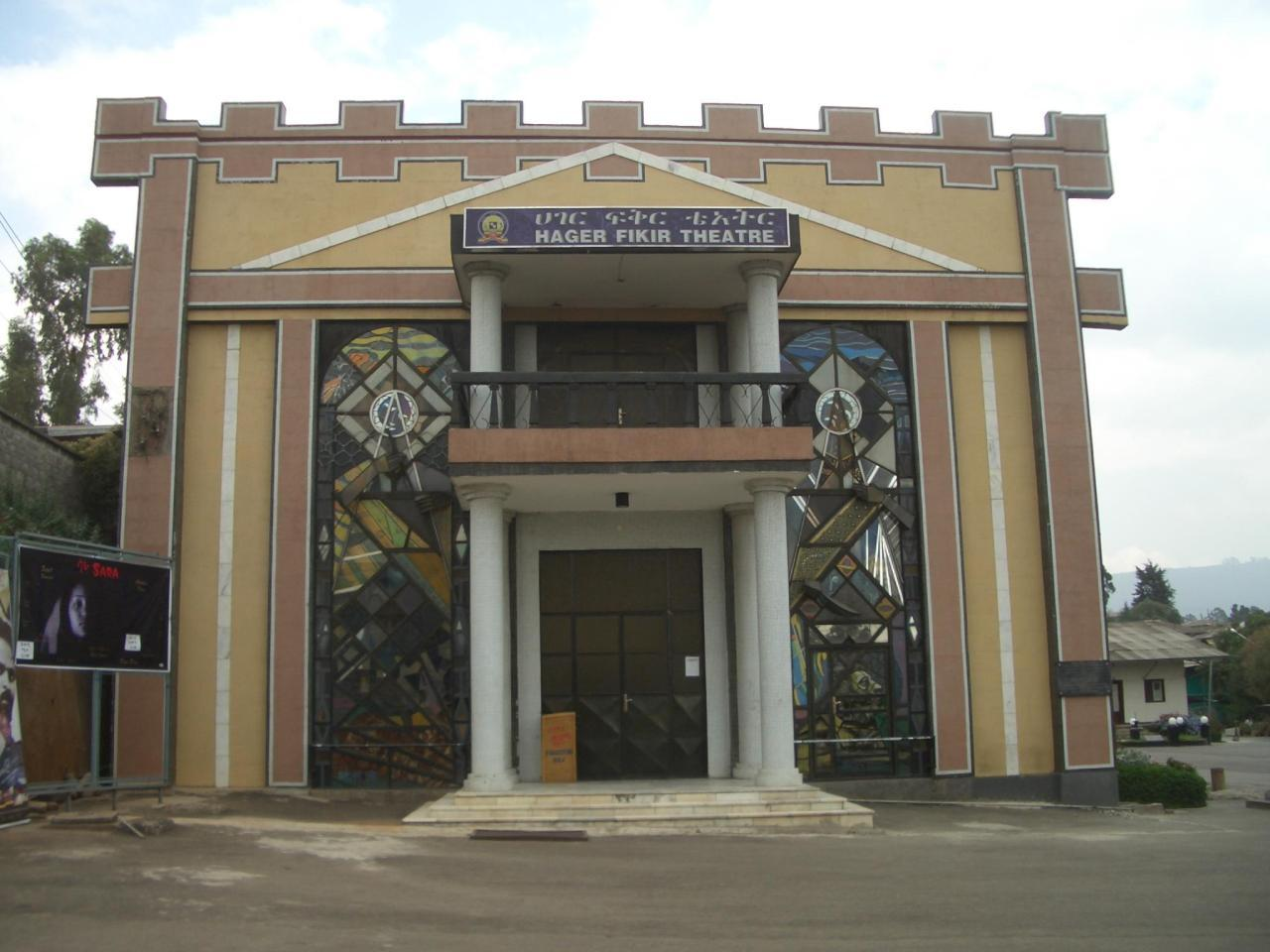
Hager Fikir Theatre (April 2006)

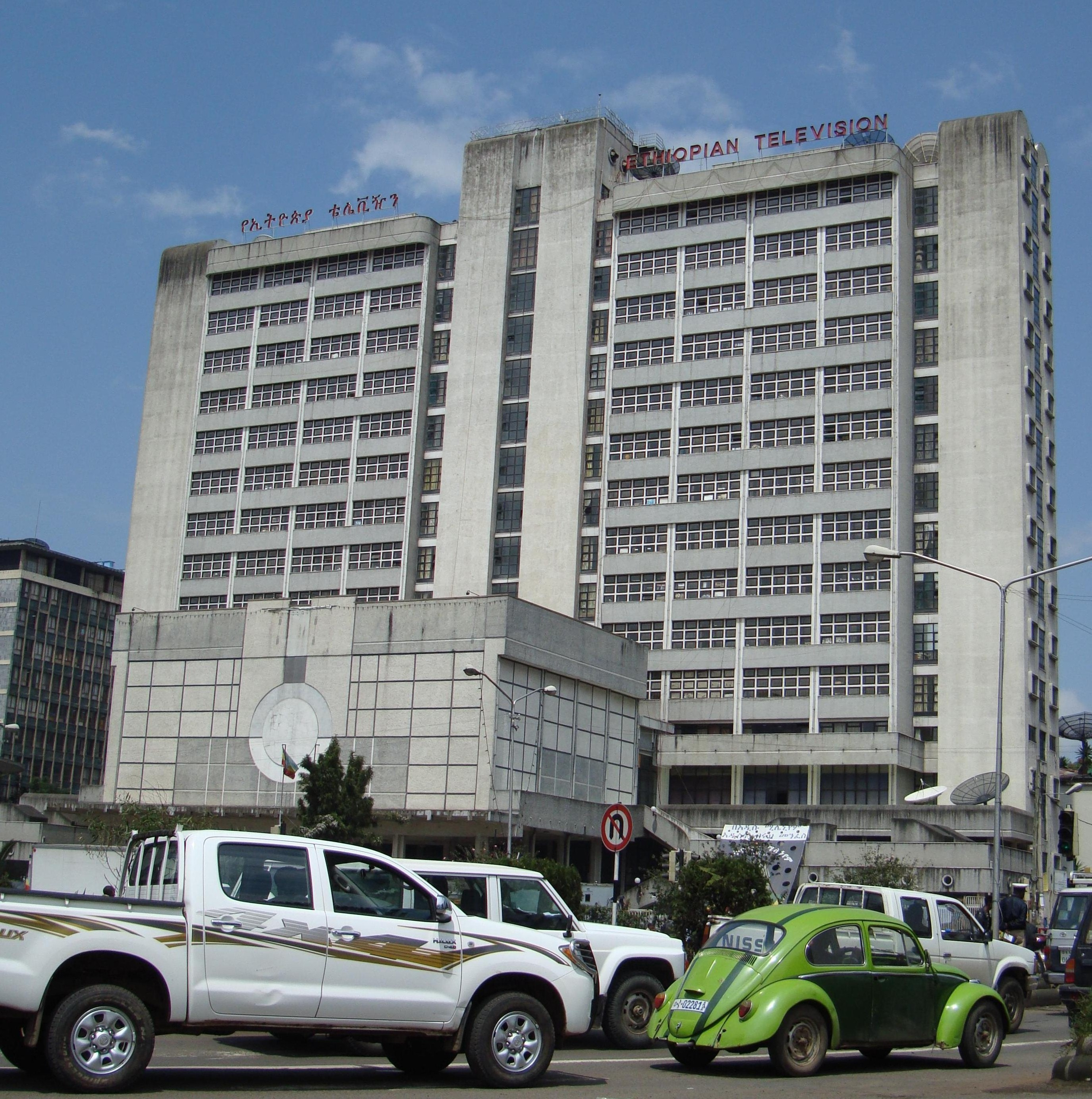
Ethiopian Radio and Television station

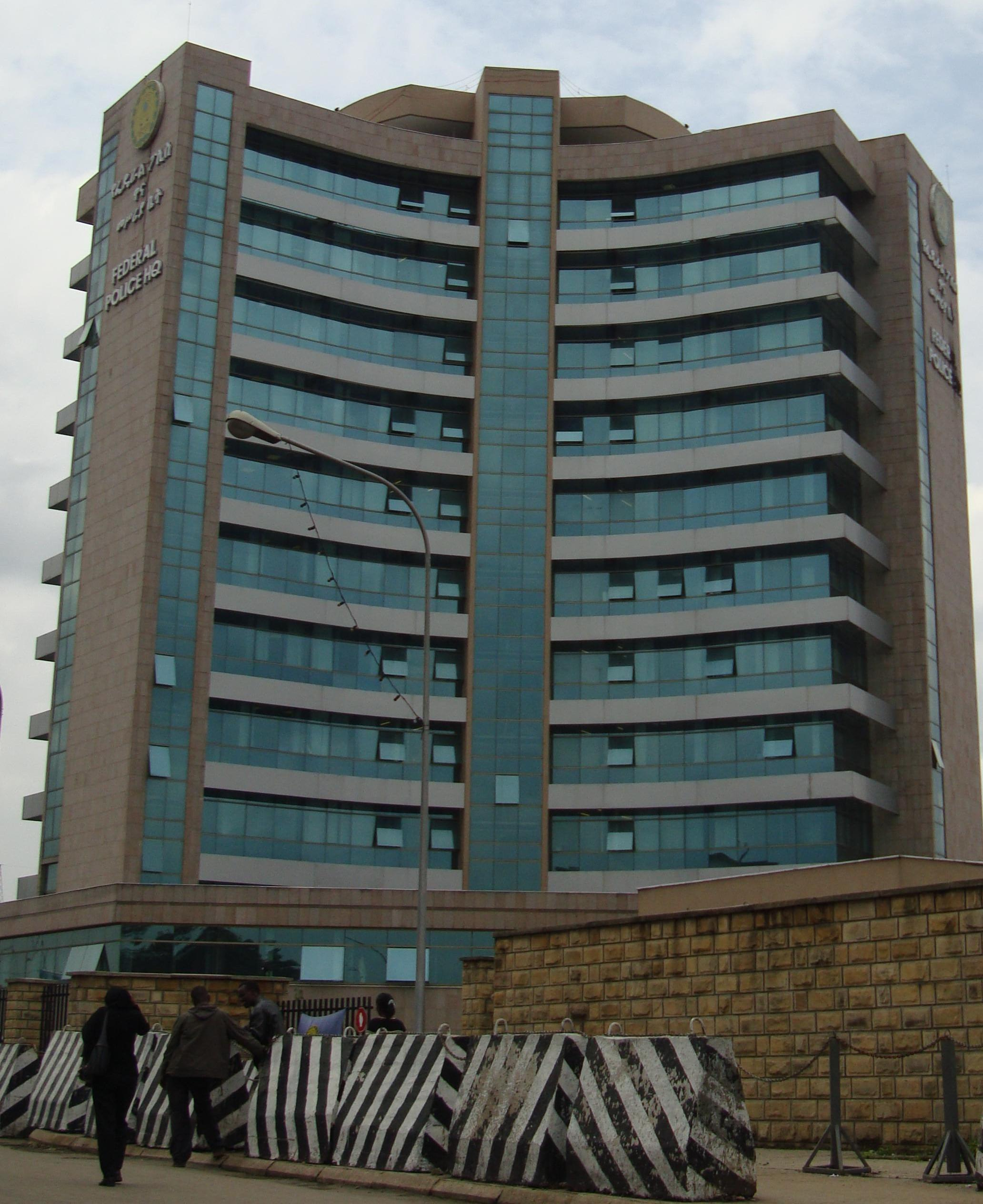
Headquarters of the Ethiopian Federal Police

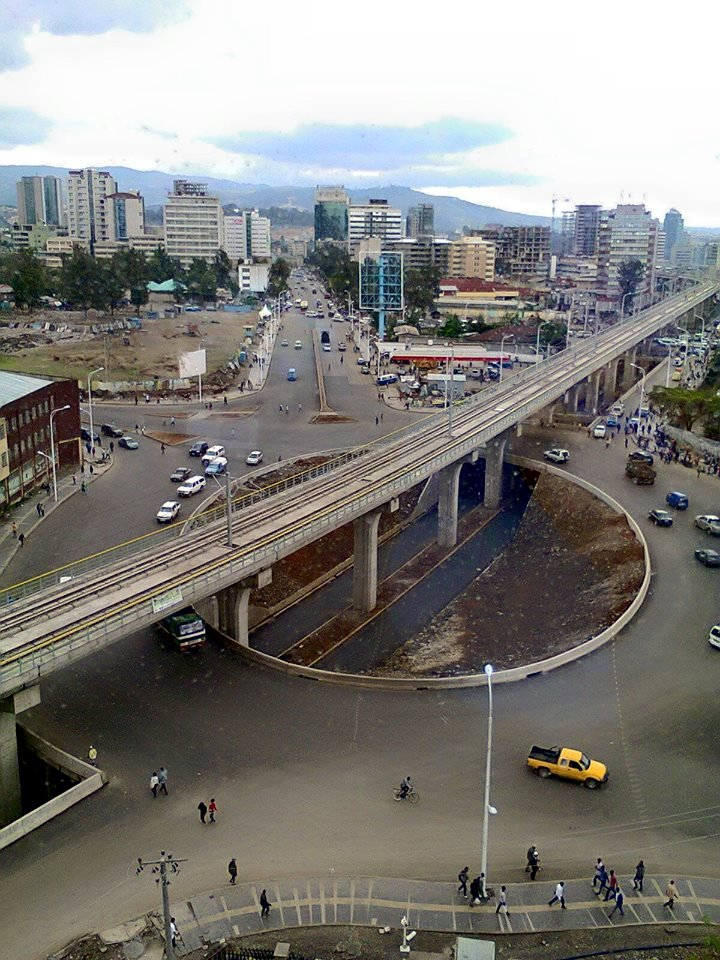
Light rail overpass at Mexico Square

== Notable people ==
- Ephraim Isaac: Scholar of Ancient Semitic Studies
- Mohammed Hussein Al Amoudi: richest person in Ethiopia (worth $8.1 billion)
- Haile Gebrselassie: Ethiopian long-distance runner
- Kenenisa Bekele: Ethiopian long-distance runner
- Yomif Kejelcha: Ethiopian long-distance runner
- Tedros Adhanom: Director-General of the World Health Organization (WHO)
- Saladin Said: Ethiopian soccer player
- Mahder Assefa: Actress
- Mulatu Astatke: Ethiopian Jazz musician
- Mahmoud Ahmed: Ethiopian singer
- Teddy Afro: Ethiopian singer
- Bethlehem Tilahun Alemu: Founder of Sole Rebels
- Eténèsh Wassié: Ethiopian azmari
- Ruth Negga: Actress
- Zemi Yenus: Autism awareness advocate

== See also ==
- ALERT (medical facility)
- Large Cities Climate Leadership Group
- Oromia Region
- Oromia Special Zone Surrounding Finfinne
- Zewditu Hospital
