= Ethiopian Patriots' Victory Day =

National holiday of Ethiopia on 5 May

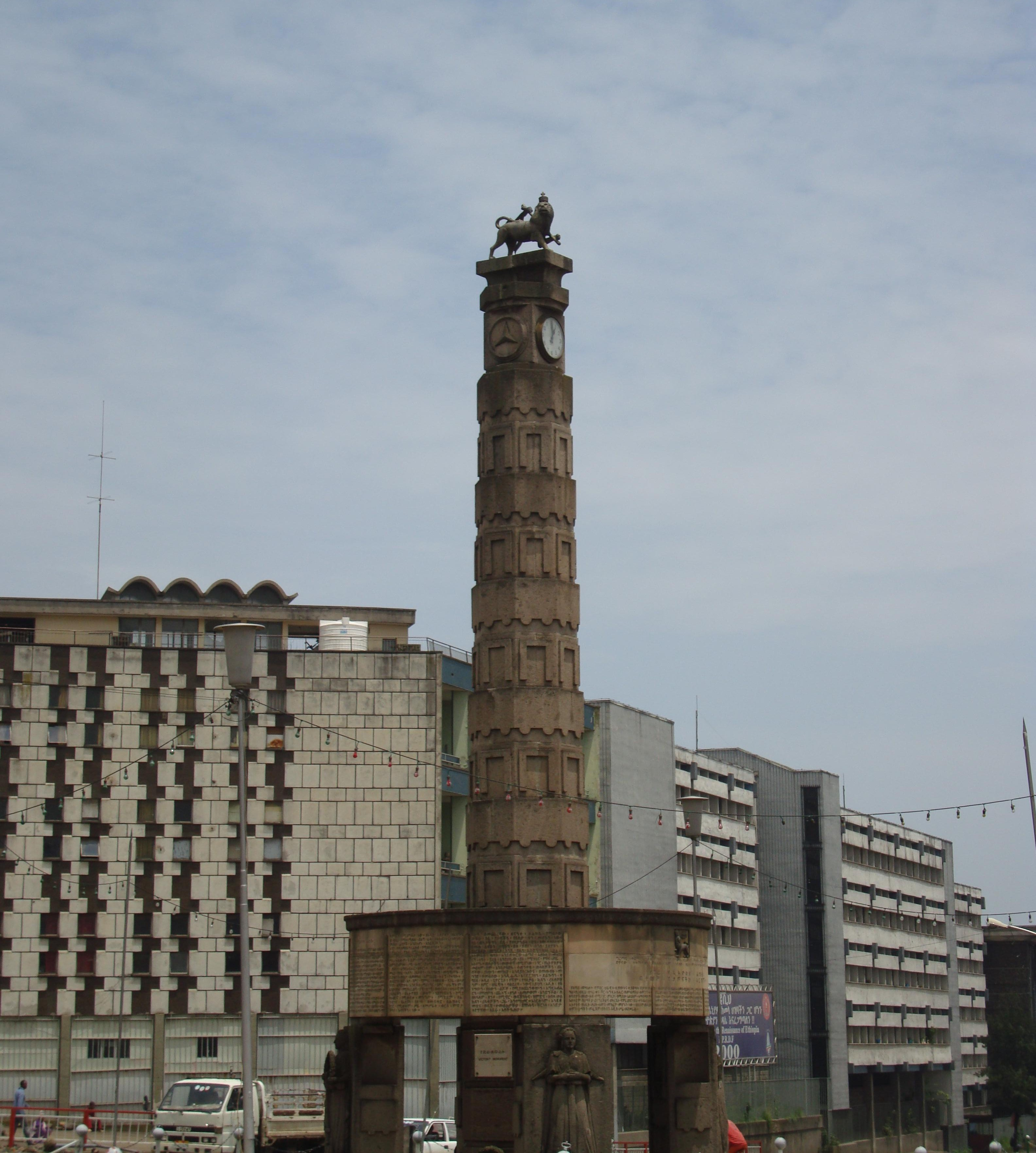
- Arat Kilo Monument in Meyazia 27 Square, Addis Ababa dedicated for this Day
- Type: National
- Significance: Victory of the Ethiopian resistance movement called Arbegnoch against occupying Italian forces in the Ethiopian Empire; Return of Emperor Haile Selassie to the throne which he had left for five years in-exile to England
- Celebrations: Parade; Government officials, members of Ethiopian Patriotic Association and city's residents gathered to pay tribute to Ethiopian victims who died during the occupation
- Date: 5 May
- Frequency: Annual

The Ethiopian Patriots' Victory Day (Amharic: የአርበኞች ድል ቀን), also called Meyazia 27, is a national holiday in Ethiopia celebrated on 5 May to commemorate the Ethiopian Arbegnoch resistance against Italy during the Second Italo-Ethiopian War (1935–1937). It also marks Haile Selassie's return to the throne and Italy's defeat following World War II.

In Addis Ababa, government leaders, diplomats, members of Ethiopian Patriotic Association, and city residents pay tribute to Ethiopian veterans serving in the War. and honor with laying a wreath into memorial monuments across the city. Parades by the Ethiopian Police Orchestra Brass Band occur to mark the occasion.
