= Unity Park =

Amusement park in Addis Ababa, Ethiopia

- አንድነት ፓርክ
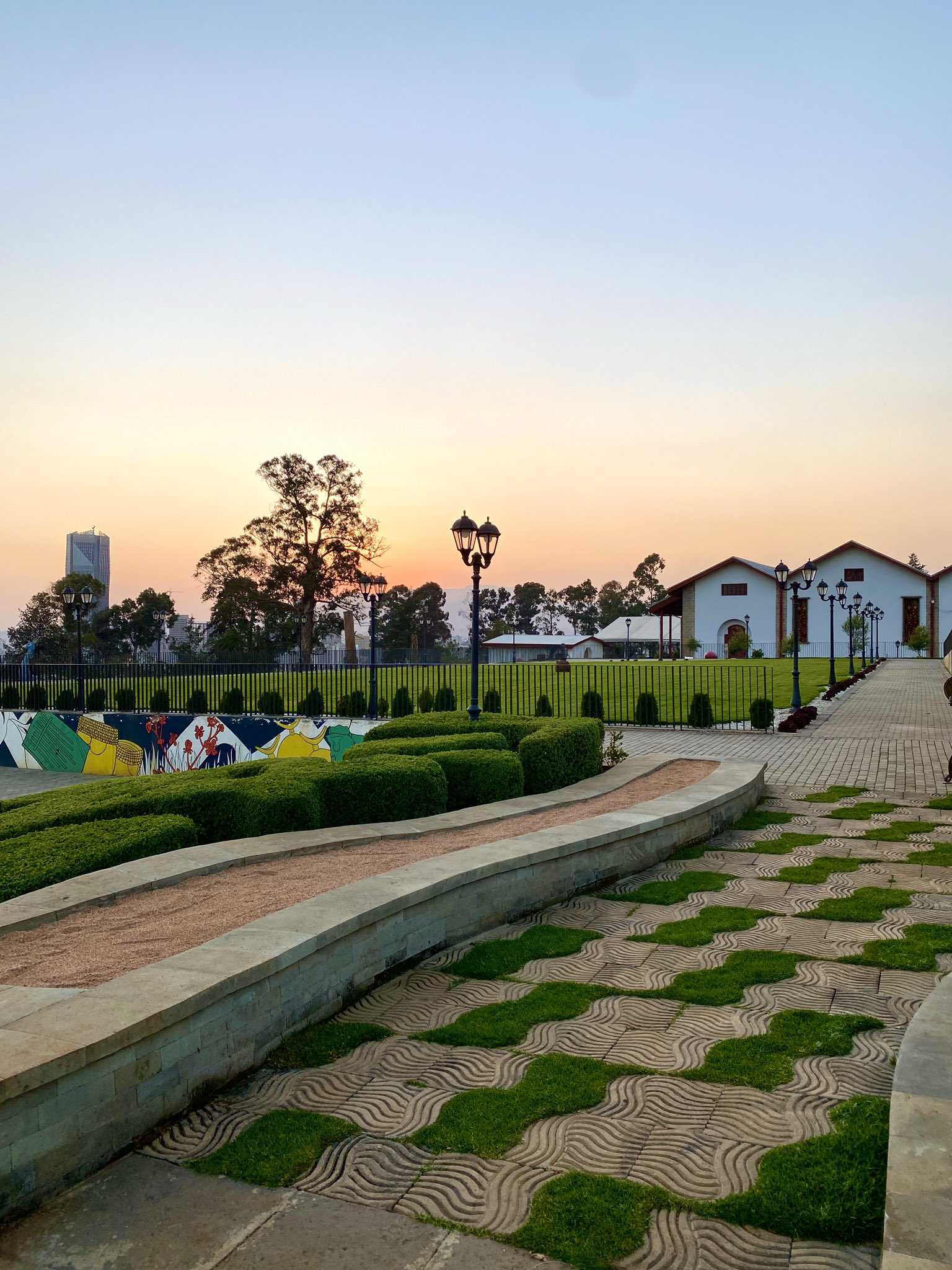
- Unity Park zoo
- Interactive map of Unity Park
- Type: Amusement park
- Location: National Palace, Arat Kilo, Addis Ababa, Ethiopia
- Coordinates: 9.023163°N 38.763976°E
- Area: 20 hectares (49 acres)
- Created: 10 October 2019
- Open: Six days per week, excluding Mondays
- Status: Active
- Website: unitypark.et

Unity Park (Amharic: አንድነት ፓርክ) is an amusement park located in Arat Kilo district of Addis Ababa, in the compound of National Palace. Established in October 2019, it features a zoo and historical artifacts. Entrance is purchased by online services such as Ethio telecom or using Commercial Bank of Ethiopia or in person in the compound premises.

== Overview ==
Inaugurated on October 10, 2019, it is part of the beautification project of Addis Ababa. Unity Park's attractions include historical artifacts and a focus on Ethiopian culture. There are 37 mammals, including giraffe, zebra, Gelada baboon, kudu, Impalas, common eland, gemsbok, meerkat, cheetah, African wild dogs, nyala, and wildebeest, as well as thirteen species of aquatic animals, and various indigenous birds in the aviary.

== Historical artifacts ==
The park also exhibits historical artifacts ranging from simple objects to relics from ancient civilizations. Every artifact is made of gold, from Emperor Haile Selassie's throne to simple restaurant materials. There are also religious books written in Amharic, English and Ge'ez languages. These books can be used for research and study.

== Opening time and ticket deliveries ==
Unity Park is open for six days per week (tues-sun) starting from 9 am to 4 pm afternoon. It is closed on Mondays for cleaning.

Admission must be purchased before visiting the park. Payment may be made via SMS, online via Ethio telecom, or via Commercial Bank of Ethiopia.
