= Amusement park =

Park with rides and attractions

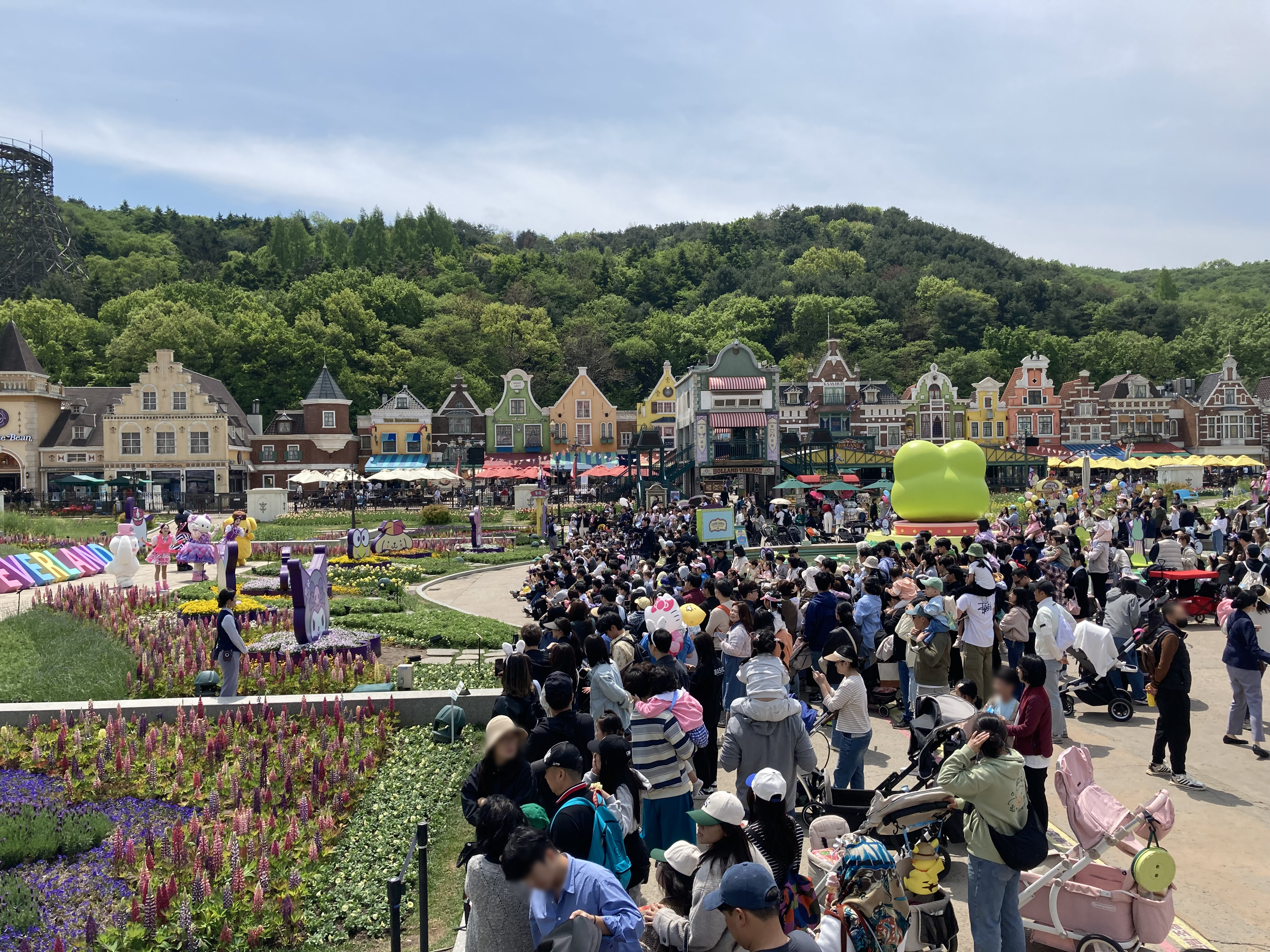
Everland in Yongin, South Korea

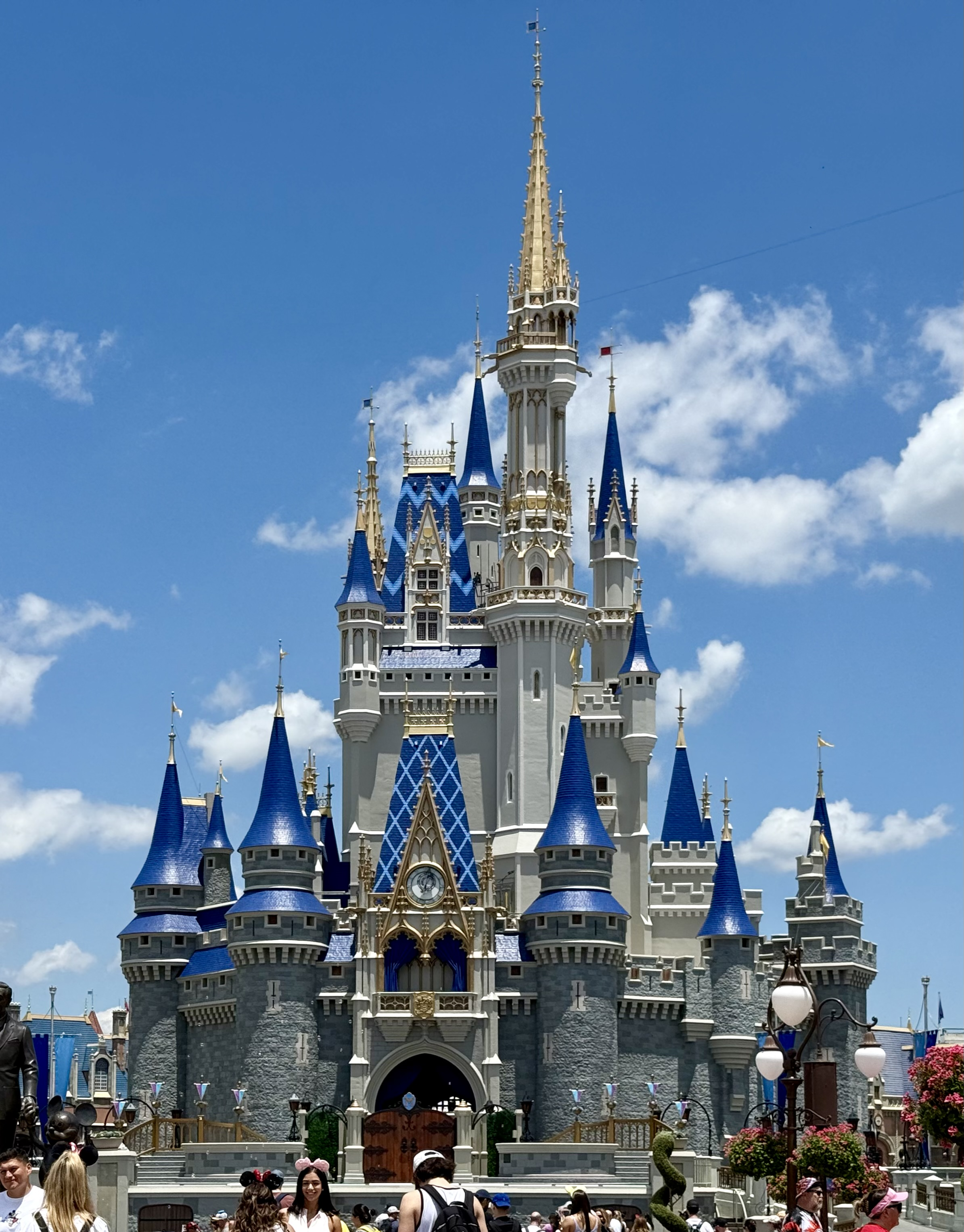
Cinderella Castle, the icon of Magic Kingdom at Walt Disney World in Bay Lake, Florida

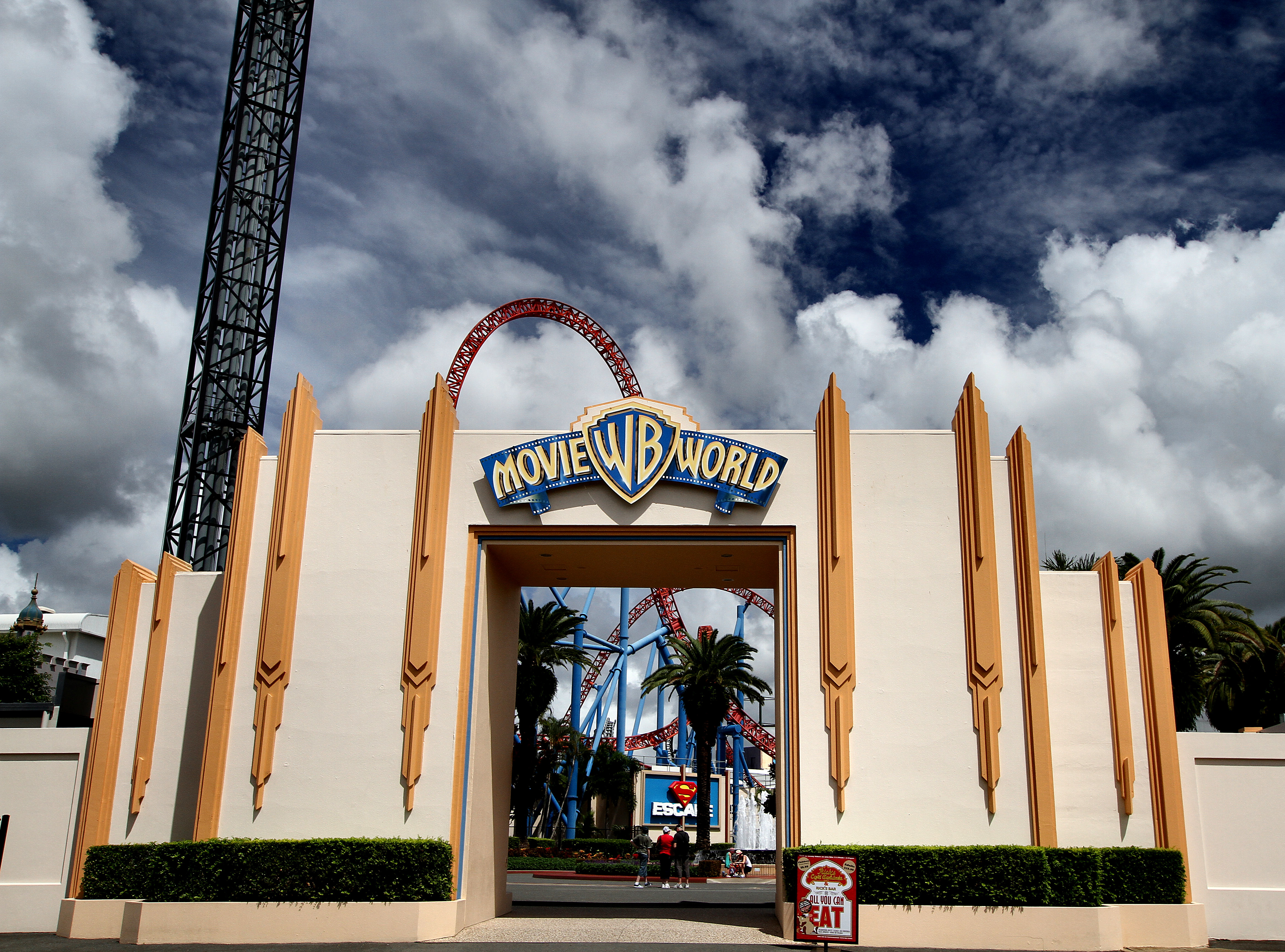
The entrance to Warner Bros. Movie World in Queensland, Australia

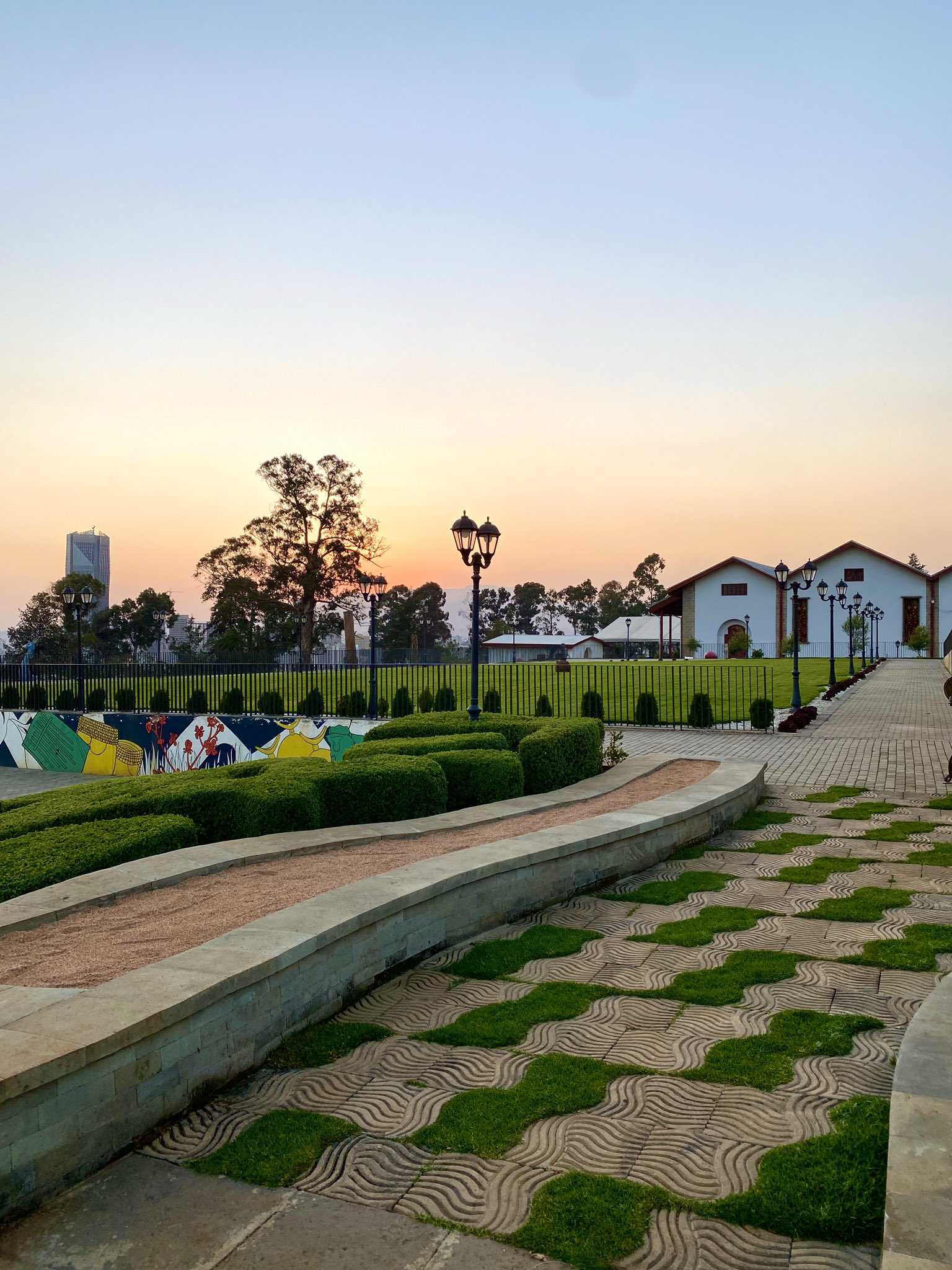
Unity Park zoo in Addis Ababa, Ethiopia

An amusement park is a park that features various attractions, such as rides and games, and events for entertainment purposes. A theme park is a type of amusement park that bases its structures and attractions around a central theme, often featuring multiple areas with different themes. Unlike temporary and mobile funfairs and carnivals, amusement parks are stationary and built for long-lasting operation. They are more elaborate than city parks and playgrounds, usually providing attractions that cater to a variety of age groups. While amusement parks often contain themed areas, theme parks place a heavier focus with more intricately designed themes that revolve around a particular subject or group of subjects.

Amusement parks evolved from European fairs, pleasure gardens, and large picnic areas, which were created for people's recreation. World's fairs and other types of international expositions also influenced the emergence of the amusement park industry.

Bakken ("The Hill") in Klampenborg, Denmark, Wurstelprater in Vienna, Austria, and Tivoli Gardens in Copenhagen, Denmark are the three oldest operating amusement parks in the world. Lake Compounce, which opened in 1846, is considered the oldest continuously operating amusement park in North America.

== History ==
=== Origins ===
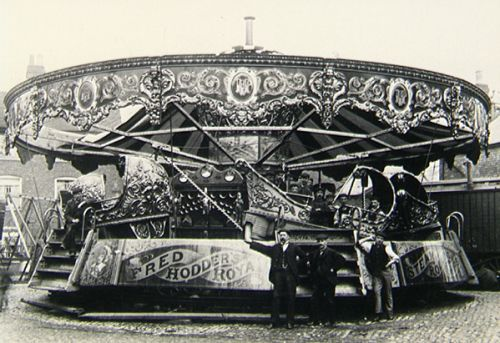
Frederick Savage's 'Sea-On-Land' carousel, where riders would pitch up and down as if they were on the sea, was the first amusement ride installed in Dreamland Margate in 1880 England.

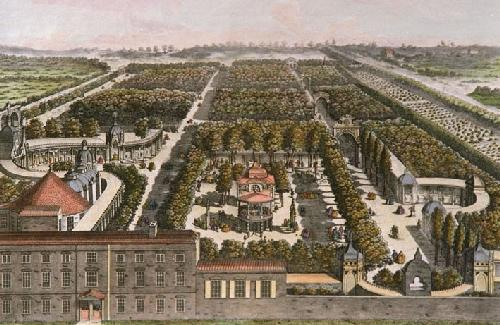
Vauxhall Gardens in Lambeth, United Kingdom, founded in 1661, one of the first pleasure gardens

The amusement park evolved from traditions in the European Middle Ages. An amusement park is a contemporary arrangement, designed to combine components of a fair, carnival, and theme park. An early example of an amusement park is the Bartholomew Fair. By the 18th and 19th centuries, they had evolved into places of entertainment for the masses, where the public could view freak shows, acrobatics, conjuring, and juggling, take part in competitions and walk through menageries.

A wave of innovation in the 1860s and 1870s created mechanical rides, such as the steam-powered carousel (built by Thomas Bradshaw, at the Aylsham Fair), and its derivatives, notably from Frederick Savage of King's Lynn, Norfolk whose fairground machinery was exported all over the world; his "galloping horses" innovation is seen in carousels today. This inaugurated the era of the modern funfair ride, as the working classes were increasingly able to spend their surplus wages on entertainment.

The second influence was the pleasure garden. Bakken ("The Hill"), the world's oldest amusement park, opened in mainland Europe in 1583. It is located north of Copenhagen in Klampenborg, Denmark. In many European countries, traditional amusement parks evolved from pleasure gardens, combining mechanical rides with landscaped spaces, live music, and seasonal festivities.

Another example in early gardens was the Vauxhall Gardens, founded in 1661, in London. By the late 18th century, the site had an admission fee for its many attractions. It regularly drew enormous crowds, with its paths often noted for romantic assignations; tightrope walkers, hot air balloon ascents, concerts and fireworks providing amusement. Although the gardens were originally designed for the elites, they soon became places of great social diversity. Public firework displays were put on at Marylebone Gardens, and Cremorne Gardens offered music, dancing, and animal acrobatics displays.

Prater, located in Vienna, Austria, began as a royal hunting ground which was opened in 1766 for public enjoyment. There followed coffee-houses and cafés, which led to the beginnings of the Wurstelprater as an amusement park.

The concept of a fixed park for amusement was further developed with the beginning of the world's fairs. The first World fair began in 1851 with the construction of the landmark Crystal Palace in London, England. The purpose of the exposition was to celebrate the industrial achievement of the nations of the world and it was designed to educate and entertain the visitors.

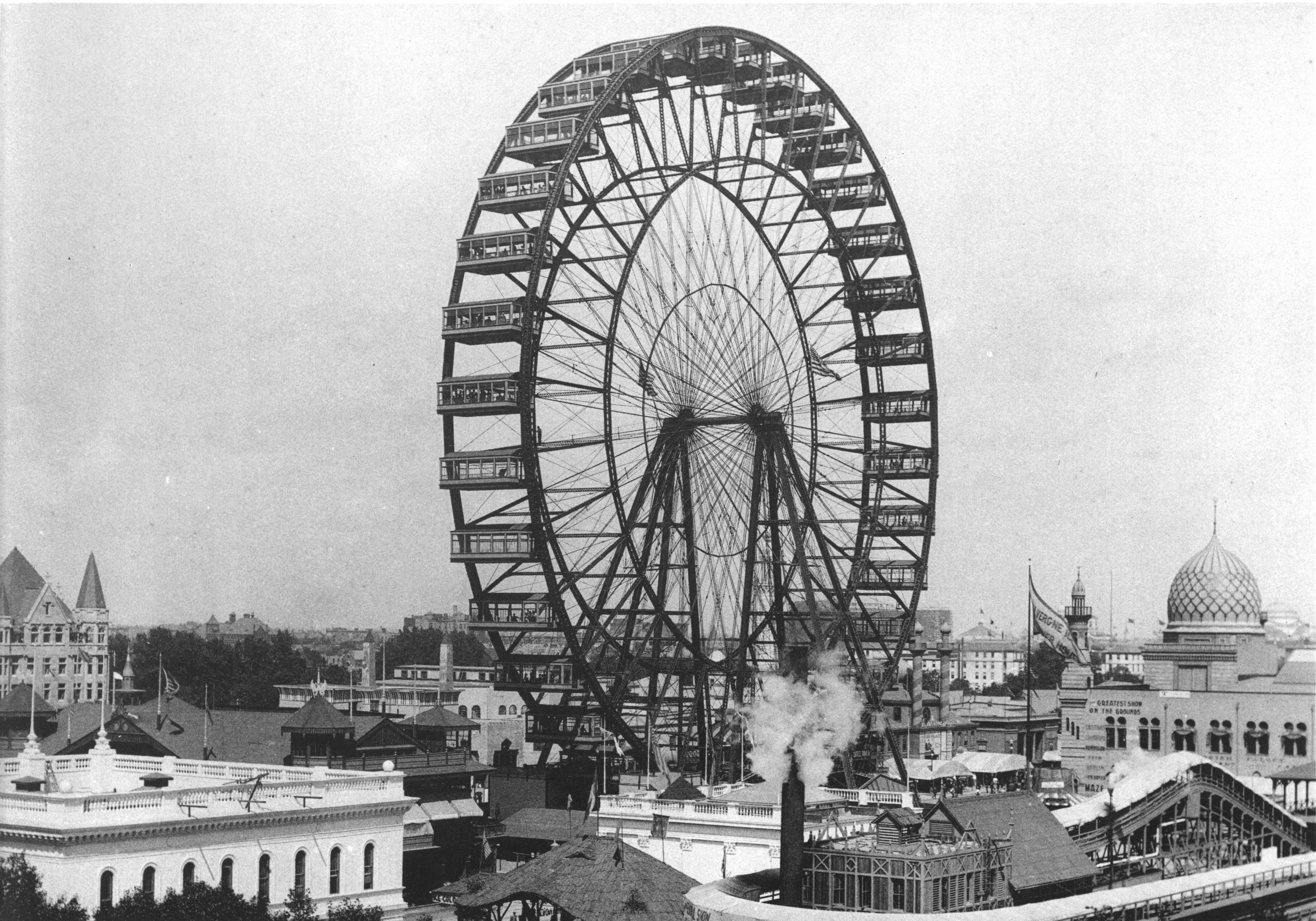
The original Ferris Wheel at the World's Columbian Exposition in Chicago in 1893

In the United States, cities and businesses also saw the world's fair as a way of demonstrating economic and industrial success. The World's Columbian Exposition of 1893 in Chicago, Illinois was an early precursor to the modern amusement park. The fair was an enclosed site, that merged entertainment, engineering and education to entertain the masses. It set out to bedazzle the visitors, and successfully did so with a blaze of lights from the "White City". To make sure that the fair was a financial success, the planners included a dedicated amusement concessions area called the Midway Plaisance. Rides from this fair captured the imagination of the visitors and of amusement parks around the world, such as the first steel Ferris wheel, which was found in many other amusement areas, such as the Prater by 1896. Also, the experience of the enclosed ideal city with wonder, rides, culture and progress (electricity), was based on the creation of an illusory place.

The "midway" introduced at the Columbian Exposition would become a standard part of most amusement parks, fairs, carnivals, and circuses. The midway contained not only the rides, but other concessions and entertainments such as shooting galleries, penny arcades, games of chance, and shows.

=== Trolley parks and pleasure resorts ===
Many modern amusement parks evolved from earlier pleasure resorts that had become popular with the public for day-trips or weekend holidays, for example, seaside areas such as Blackpool, United Kingdom and Coney Island, United States. In the United States, some amusement parks grew from picnic groves established along rivers and lakes that provided bathing and water sports, such as Lake Compounce in Connecticut, first established as a picturesque picnic park in 1846, and Riverside Park in Massachusetts, founded in the 1870s along the Connecticut River.

The trick was getting the public to the seaside or resort location. For Coney Island in Brooklyn, New York, on the Atlantic Ocean, a horse-drawn streetcar line brought pleasure seekers to the beach beginning in 1829. In 1875, a million passengers rode the Coney Island Railroad, and in 1876 two million visited Coney Island. Hotels and amusements were built to accommodate both the upper classes and the working class at the beach. Its first amusement ride, a carousel, was installed in 1876; the first roller coaster, the "Switchback Railway", in 1884.

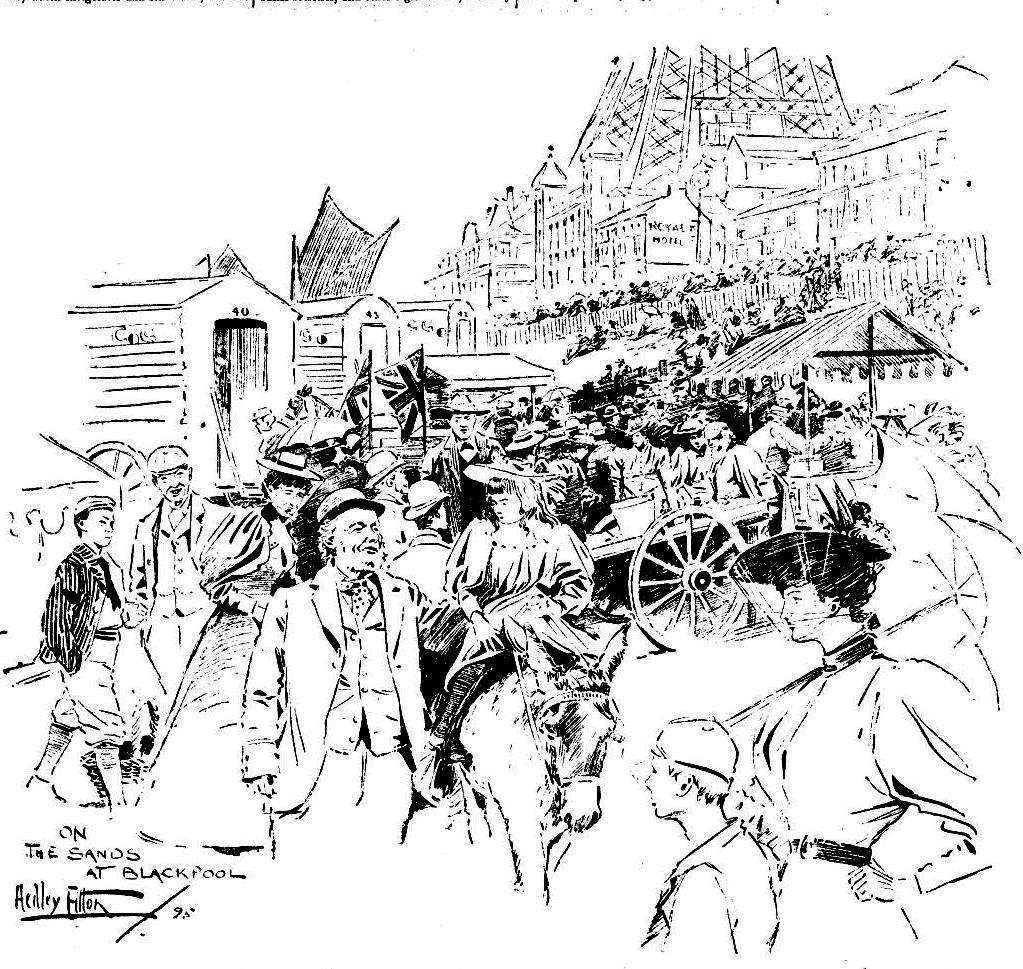
Blackpool Beach in Blackpool, United Kingdom, in 1895

In England, Blackpool was a popular beachside location beginning in the 1700s. It rose to prominence as a seaside resort with the completion in 1846 of a branch line to Blackpool from Poulton on the main Preston and Wyre Joint Railway line. A sudden influx of visitors, arriving by rail, provided the motivation for entrepreneurs to build accommodation and create new attractions, leading to more visitors and a rapid cycle of growth throughout the 1850s and 1860s.

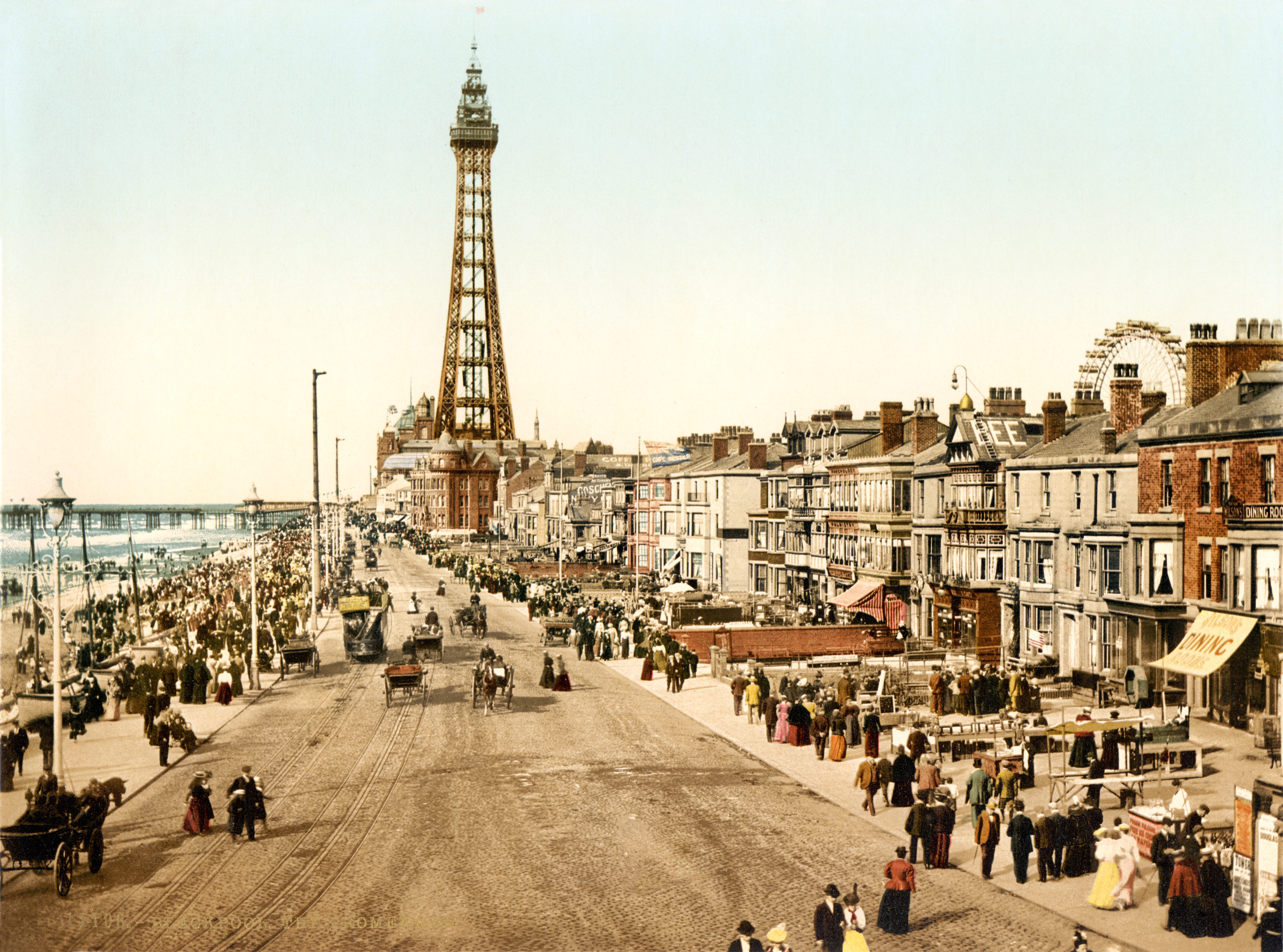
The photochrom at the Promenade in Blackpool, United Kingdom, c. 1898

In 1879, large parts of the promenade at Blackpool were wired. The lighting and its accompanying pageants reinforced Blackpool's status as the North of England's most prominent holiday resort, and its specifically working class character. It was the forerunner of the present-day Blackpool Illuminations. By the 1890s, the town had a population of 35,000, and could accommodate 250,000 holidaymakers. The number of annual visitors, many staying for a week, was estimated at three million.

In the final decade of the 19th century, electric trolley lines were developed in many large American cities. Companies that established the trolley lines also developed trolley parks as destinations of these lines. Trolley parks such as Atlanta's Ponce de Leon Park, or Reading's Carsonia Park were initially popular natural leisure spots before local streetcar companies purchased the sites, expanding them from picnic groves to include regular entertainments, mechanical amusements, dance halls, sports fields, boat rides, restaurants and other resort facilities.

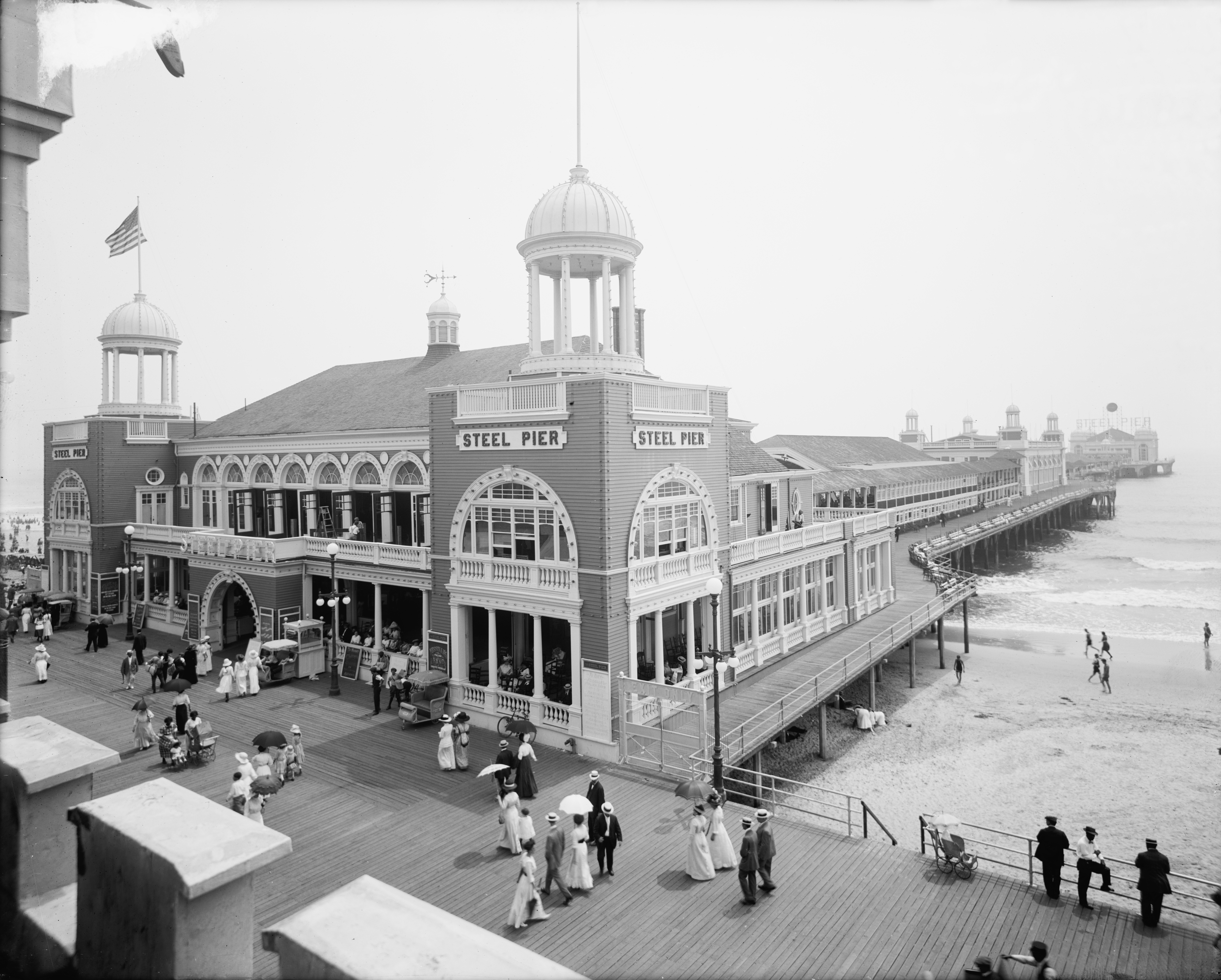
Steel Pier in Atlantic City, New Jersey, c. 1910s

Some of these parks were developed in resort locations, such as bathing resorts at the seaside in New Jersey and New York. A premiere example in New Jersey was Atlantic City, a famous vacation resort. Entrepreneurs erected amusement parks on piers that extended from the boardwalk out over the ocean. The first of several was the Ocean Pier in 1891, followed later by the Steel Pier in 1898, both of which boasted rides and attractions typical of that time, such as Midway-style games and electric trolley rides. The boardwalk also had the first Roundabout installed in 1892 by William Somers, a wooden predecessor to the Ferris Wheel. Somers installed two others in Asbury Park, New Jersey and Coney Island, New York.

Another early park was the Eldorado Amusement Park that opened in 1891 on the banks of the Hudson River, overlooking New York City. It consisted of 25 acres.

=== Modern amusement parks ===
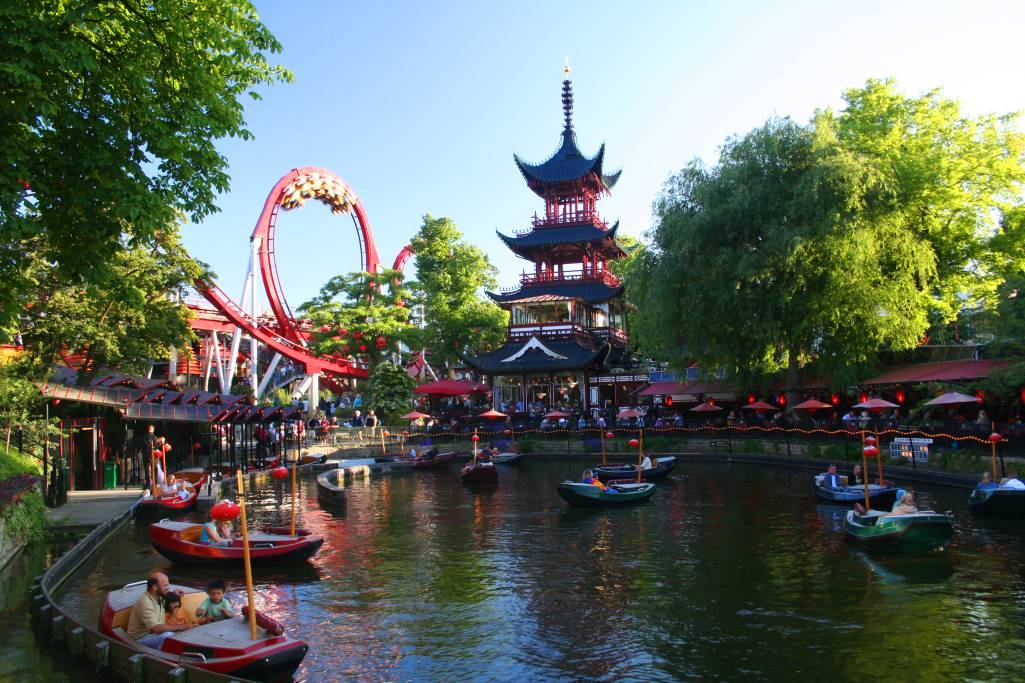
Tivoli Gardens in Copenhagen, Denmark, opened in 1843. Tivoli is always evolving, Georg Carstensen said in 1844: "Tivoli will never, so to speak, be finished", a sentiment echoed just over a century later when Walt Disney said of his own Tivoli-inspired theme park, "Disneyland will never be completed. It will continue to grow as long as there is imagination left in the world".

The first permanent enclosed entertainment area, regulated by a single company, was founded in Coney Island in 1895: Sea Lion Park at Coney Island in Brooklyn. This park was one of the first to charge admission fee to get into the park in addition to sell tickets for rides within the park.

In 1897, Sea Lion Park was joined by Steeplechase Park, the first of three major amusement parks that opened in the Coney Island area. George Tilyou designed the park to provide thrills and entertainment. The combination of the nearby population center of New York City and the ease of access to the area made Coney Island the embodiment of the American amusement park. Coney Island also featured Luna Park (1903) and Dreamland (1904). Coney Island was a huge success and by the year 1910 attendance on days could reach a million people. Fueled by the efforts of Frederick Ingersoll who borrowed the name, other "Luna Parks" were quickly erected worldwide and opened to rave reviews.

The first amusement park in England, Blackpool Pleasure Beach, opened in 1896, developed by W. G. Bean. In 1904, Sir Hiram Maxim's Captive Flying Machine was introduced; he had designed an early aircraft powered by steam engines that had been unsuccessful and instead opened up a pleasure ride of flying carriages that revolved around a central pylon. Other rides included the 'Grotto' (a fantasy ride), 'River Caves' (a scenic railway), water chutes and a tobogganing tower.

Fire was a constant threat in those days, as much of the construction within the amusement parks of the era was wooden. In 1911, Dreamland was the first Coney Island amusement park to completely burn down; in 1944, Luna Park also burned to the ground. Most of Ingersoll's Luna Parks were similarly destroyed, usually by arson, before his death in 1927.

=== 20th century ===
During the Gilded Age, many Americans began working fewer hours and had more disposable income. With new-found money and time to spend on leisure activities, Americans sought new venues for entertainment. Amusement parks, set up outside major cities and in rural areas, emerged to meet this new economic opportunity. These parks served as a source of fantasy and escape from real life. By the early 1900s, hundreds of amusement parks were operating in the United States and Canada. Trolley parks stood outside many cities. Parks like Atlanta's Ponce de Leon and Idora Park, near Youngstown, OH, took passengers to traditionally popular picnic grounds, which by the late 1890s also often included rides like the Giant Swing, Carousel, and Shoot-the-Chutes. These amusement parks were often based on nationally known parks or world's fairs: they had names like Coney Island, White City, Luna Park, or Dreamland. The American Gilded Age was, in fact, amusement parks' Golden Age that reigned until the late 1920s.

The Golden Age of amusement parks also included the advent of the kiddie park. Founded in 1925, the original Kiddie Park is located in San Antonio, Texas, and is still in operation as of 2022. The kiddie parks became popular all over America after World War II.

This era saw the development of new innovations in roller coasters that included extreme drops and speeds to thrill the riders. By the end of World War I, people seemed to want an even more exciting entertainment, a need met by roller coasters. Although the development of the automobile provided people with more options for satisfying their entertainment needs, the amusement parks after the war continued to be successful, while urban amusement parks saw declining attendance. The 1920s is more properly known as the Golden Age of roller coasters, being the decade of frenetic building for these rides.

In England, Dreamland Margate opened in 1880 with Frederick Savage's carousel the first amusement ride installed. In 1920 the Scenic Railway rollercoaster opened to the public with great success, carrying half a million passengers in its first year. The park also installed other rides common to the time including a smaller roller coaster, the Joy Wheel, Miniature Railway, The Whip and the River Caves. A ballroom was constructed on the site of the Skating Rink in 1920 and in 1923 a Variety Cinema was built on the site. Between 1920 and 1935 over £500,000 was invested in the site, constantly adding new rides and facilities and culminating in the construction of the Dreamland Cinema complex in 1934 which stands to this day.

Until 2011, the Blackpool Pleasure Beach ranked among the top free of charge attractions in Britain. Blackpool Pleasure beach was developed continuously, requiring frequent large-scale investments. The construction of many new rides could be counted on. Rides included the Virginia Reel, Whip, Noah's Ark, Big Dipper and Dodgems. In the 1920s the "Casino Building" was built, which remains to this day. In 1923, land was reclaimed from the sea front. It was at this period that the park moved to its 44-acre (18 ha) current location above what became Watson Road, which was built under the Pleasure Beach in 1932. During this time Joseph Emberton, an architect famous for his work in the amusement trade was brought in to redesign the architectural style of the Pleasure Beach rides, working on the "Grand National" roller coaster, "Noah's Ark" and the Casino building to name a few.

The Great Depression of the 1930s and World War II during the 1940s saw the decline of the amusement park industry. War caused the affluent urban population to move to the suburbs, television became a source of entertainment, and families went to amusement parks less often.

By the 1950s, factors such as urban decay, crime, and even desegregation in the ghettos led to changing patterns in how people chose to spend their free time. Many of the older, traditional amusement parks closed or burned to the ground. Many would be taken out by the wrecking ball to make way for suburb and housing and development. In 1964, Steeplechase Park, once the king of all amusement parks, closed down for good. The traditional amusement parks which survived, for example, Kennywood, in West Mifflin, Pennsylvania, and Cedar Point, in Sandusky, Ohio, did so in spite of the odds.

Inspired by the layout of Tivoli Gardens theme park in Copenhagen, Denmark, in 1951, Walt Disney came up with the idea of having an amusement park next to the studios in Burbank. The park would have been called Mickey Mouse Park, built across the street with a western area featuring a steam driven paddleboat, a turn of the century town, and a midway. It was rejected by the Burbank city council in fear of a carnival atmosphere. In 1952, he created WED Enterprises to design the park, which was now to be built in Anaheim, and in 1953, was able to convince the bankers on funding the park with the help of a studio artist, Herb Ryman, by making an aerial drawing of Disneyland. By July 1954, construction had started with a deadline of one year. Disneyland opened on July 17, 1955, and two months after the park opened, it welcomed its one millionth guest. Because of the financial success of Disneyland, the amusement industry was reinvigorated. What became Busch Gardens Tampa opened in 1959 as a garden and bird sanctuary. Six Flags Over Texas opened in 1961, themed to the six countries that ruled over Texas. In 1964, Universal Studios Hollywood opened to the public with a studio tour of their backlot that had multiple adventure scenes and became a proper theme park. That same year, SeaWorld San Diego opened and displayed many varieties of aquatic and marine life.

Initially meant to house Walt Disney's dream idea, EPCOT (Experimental Prototype Community Of Tomorrow), Disney executives decided to settle on building the park first in Walt Disney World and the city later. After six years of construction, Walt Disney World opened to the public on October 1, 1971. Meant to be a larger east coast version of Disneyland, it had copies of most of the attractions from Disneyland (except for Liberty Square and the Hall of Presidents), yet it was financially the most ambitious project Walt Disney Productions had ever undertaken, and succeeded once the holiday crowds came in during Thanksgiving. In 1982, Walt Disney Productions opened the second Walt Disney World park, EPCOT Center, based on Walt Disney's futurist ideals and World Fairs. Like a World's Fair, the park would display the latest technologies in an area called Future World, and the cultural pavilions in World Showcase. In 1983, Disney opened their first park in Asia, Tokyo Disneyland, in Japan, which has a similar layout to the Magic Kingdom but has a few changes.

In 1987, Disney announced that it would open its third Disney World park, Disney-MGM Studios in 1989, which would have a working backlot. However, Universal knew that its Californian backlot tour would not work as a standalone attraction next to Disney World (especially now as Disney built one in Disney-MGM). So it divided up the segments of its California tour into individual attractions, such as Jaws, Disaster!, and Kongfrontation. Disney-MGM Studios opened it on May 1, 1989, with two major attractions: The Backlot Tour and The Great Movie Ride. The concept for the park started out as an EPCOT pavilion, but was turned into a park as a "half day" attraction—a complement to the rest of the resort. The rest of the park was themed to 1930s Hollywood and featured lost parts of Hollywood like the Brown Derby. Universal Studios Florida opened on June 7, 1990 (delayed by one year) to great fanfare, but the primary attractions were experiencing severe technical difficulties. All three of the park's major attractions (Jaws, Disaster!, and Kongfrontation) were not working and suffered major technical difficulties. Disaster! and Kongfrontation were fixed by the end of June, but Jaws had to be rebuilt and reopened three years later. However, Universal learned from opening day and started conducting exit surveys and special ticket deals.

In 1992, Disney opened its first European park, Euro Disneyland, outside of Paris, France, designed to be like the Disneyland in California, yet it caters to the European tastes through changes, including removing Tomorrowland and replacing it with Discoveryland, themed to the great futuristic thinkers of European culture such as H. G. Wells and Jules Verne. A recession in the French economy and the immense public backlash against the park led to financial hardship, putting the park into debt. However, this did not stop Disney from expanding Disney-MGM Studios with The Twilight Zone Tower of Terror, in 1994, and building their fourth Walt Disney World park, Disney's Animal Kingdom.

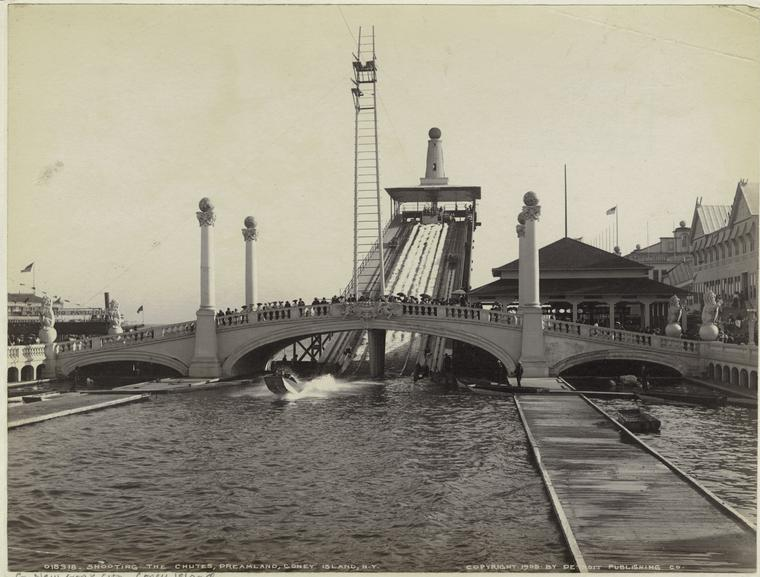
The shoot-the-chute ride at Dreamland, in Coney Island, c. 1905

Scenic Railway at Margate in Kent, United Kingdom, in the 1930s

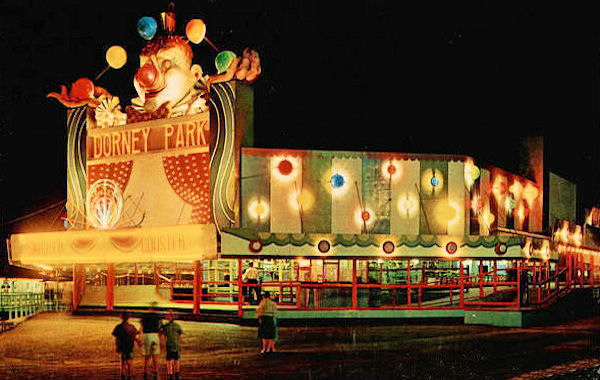
The main entrance to Dorney Park & Wildwater Kingdom in Allentown, Pennsylvania, the fifth-oldest continuous operating amusement park in the United States, in 1950

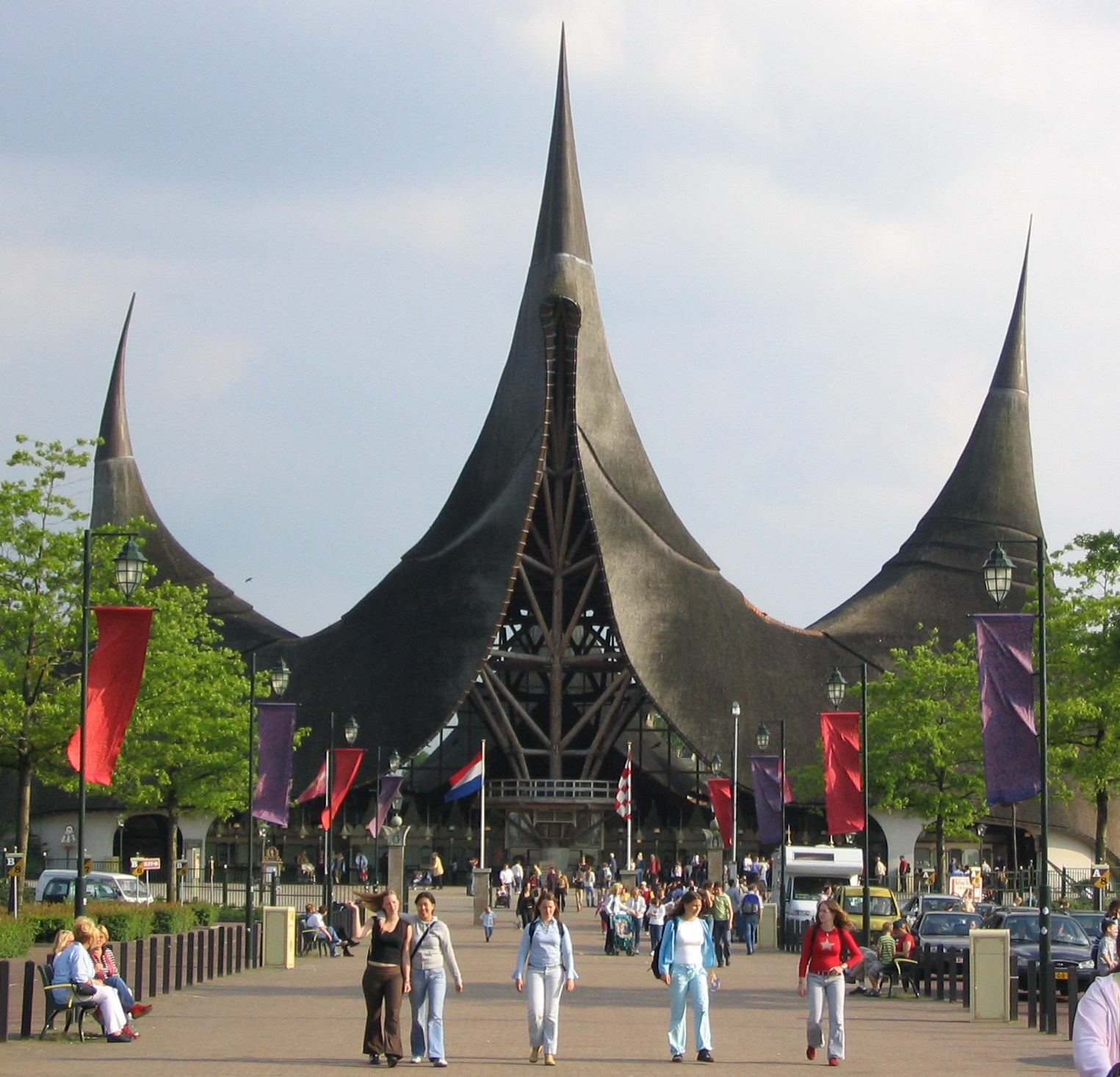
The entrance to the Efteling theme park in the Netherlands, which opened in 1952

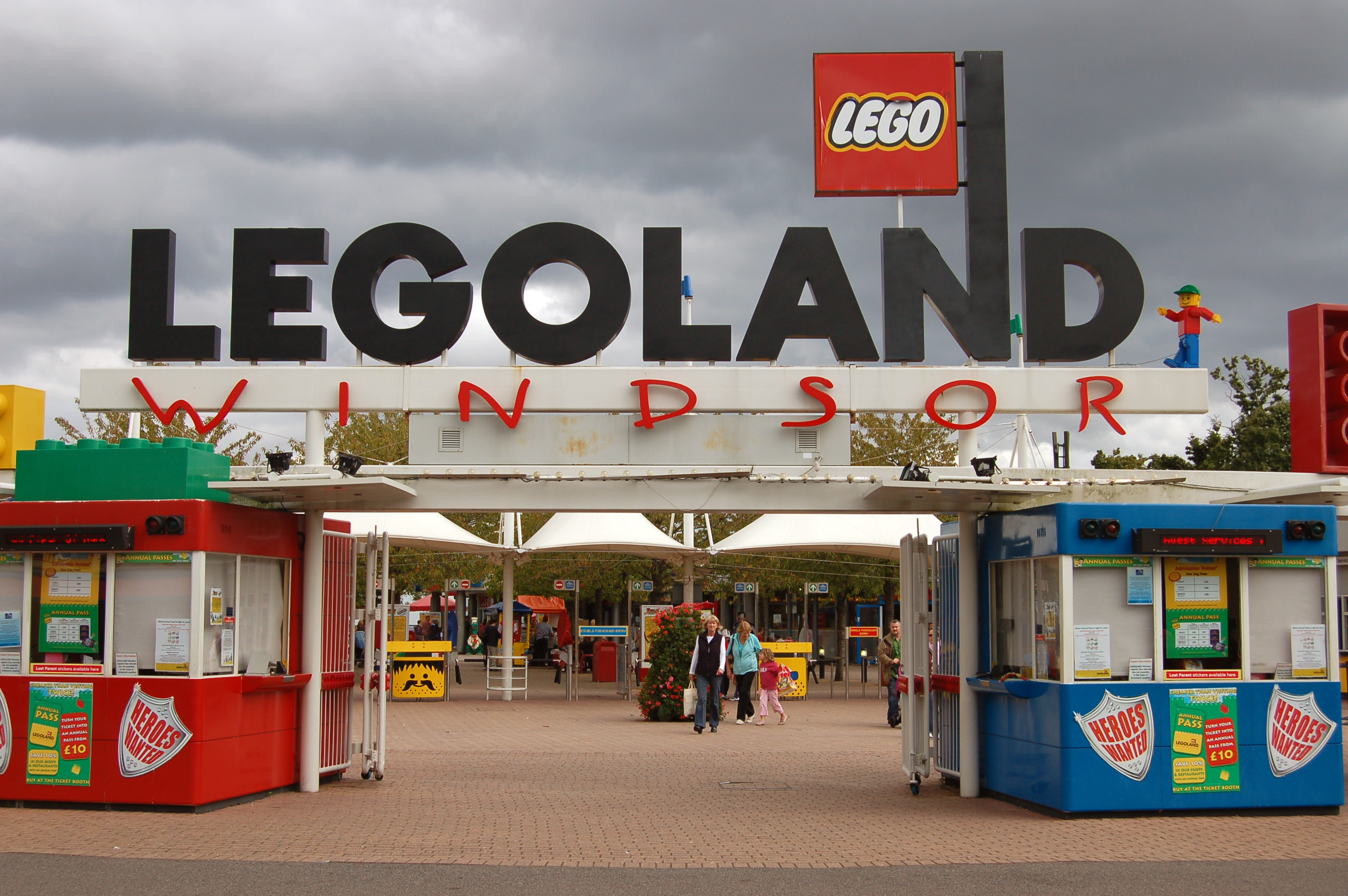
Opened in 1996, Legoland Windsor in England regularly draws more attendees than the original Legoland Billund Resort in Denmark; in 2020 it was the third most-visited theme park in the UK.

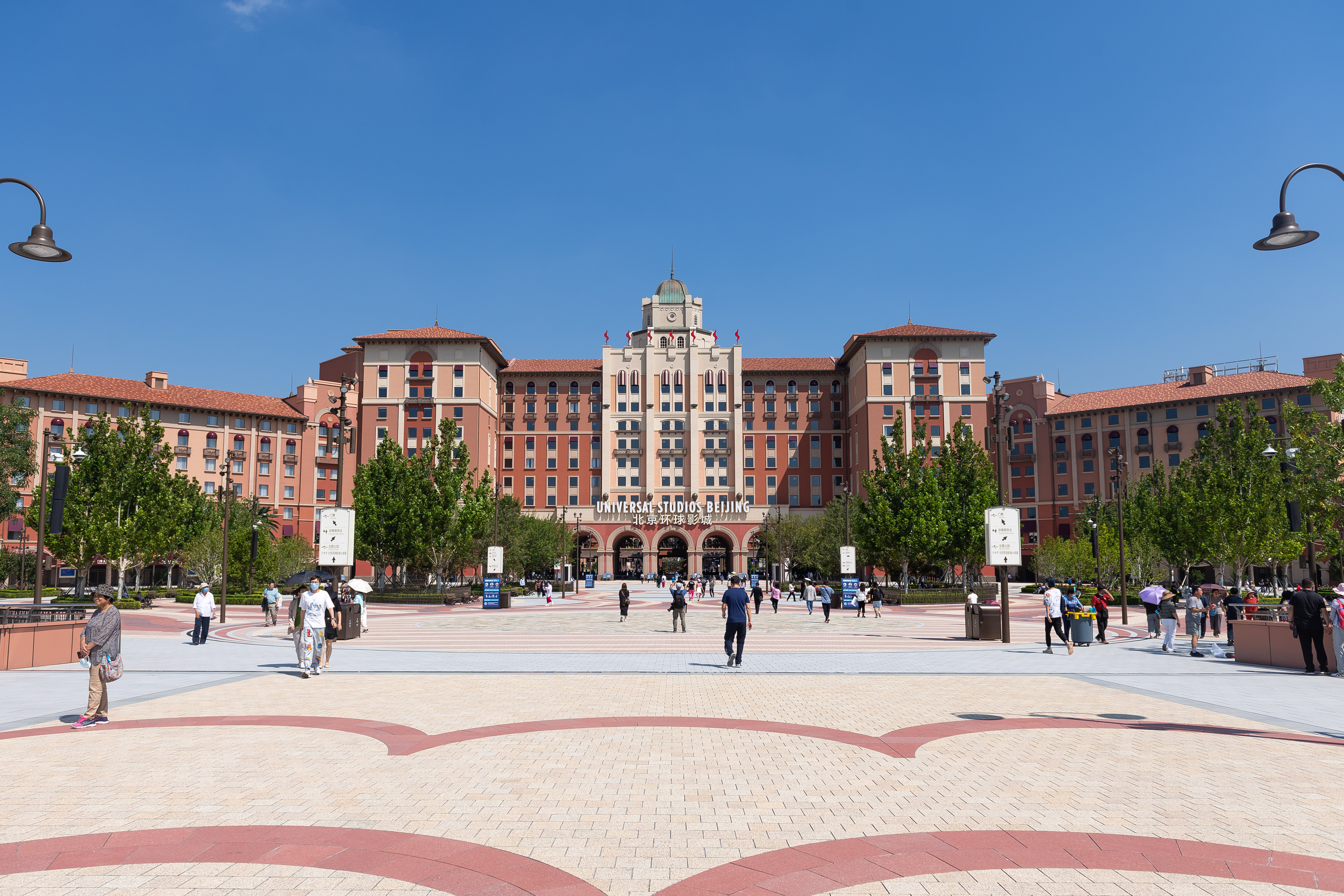
The entrance of Universal Studios Beijing

=== 21st century ===
In the early 1990s, after the opening of Universal Studios Florida, Universal sought to build a second theme park, one aimed more towards children and their families. Universal acquired the theme park rights to many properties including DC and Dr. Seuss to build the park around. In 1999, Universal Studios opened Universal Studios Islands of Adventure under the new resort name Universal Studios Escape. The park was allegedly designed by former Disney Imagineers who left after the financial disaster of Disneyland Paris. In the late 80s, the Oriental Land Company (the owners and operators of Tokyo Disneyland resort which opened in 1983) wanted a second park. None of the current non-Magic Kingdom parks satisfied the Japanese, but one concept thrown away for Disneyland's second gate inspired a new one: DisneySea. Tokyo DisneySea is themed after stories based on the ocean and nautical adventure. It was constructed at a cost of ¥335 billion and opened on September 4, 2001. The park's two signature attractions are a modernized version of 20,000 Leagues Under The Sea and Journey To The Center of The Earth.

In the early 1990s, Michael Eisner wanted to make Disneyland in the image of Walt Disney World's resort style. Plans were made for multiple hotels, such as one based on the Grand Floridian Hotel, and a new west coast version of EPCOT, called WESTCOT. WESTCOT never came to be due to local opposition from residents, rising costs, and the financial fallout of Disneyland Paris. After a corporate retreat in Colorado, Disney executives decided to make a park themed to California so that guests could experience all of California within the confines of the Disneyland Resort and would be built across from Disneyland on its 100-acre parking lot. Disney's California Adventure would be the largest disaster Disney ever created because unlike Disneyland, it would be set in the modern day and spoof modern-day California with its cheap, insincere, and flat backdrops. The park would be adult focused, sell fine food, and serve alcohol. When the park opened on February 8, 2001, it received a chilly reception for its lack of attractions, poor environment (for example, Hollywood Studios Backlot was themed to a modern-day movie backlot of modern-day Hollywood), and overemphasis on retail and dining. When John Hench (an original Imagineer who worked with Walt and was a chief creative executive at Imagineering since Imagineering was founded) was asked for his opinion on the park, he reportedly said, "I preferred the parking lot."

Walt Disney Studios Park in Paris was the second Disneyland Paris park. Disney had to build a second park or risk losing the land to the French government. The park opened March 16, 2002, with only three rides and California Adventure style theming. However, Hong Kong Disneyland was higher quality than the other black sheep, but still lacked the number of attractions that was needed, just like California Adventure and Walt Disney Studios Park. It opened on September 12, 2005, with only four lands, and had exorbitant wait times on opening day for everything from rides to food.

In the early 2000s, the Harry Potter book series written by J. K. Rowling had become a pop culture phenomenon. Universal and Disney entered a bidding war over the theme park rights to the books, but Disney seemed to have won after Rowling signed a letter of intent with Disney. However, Rowling was disappointed with Disney's small-scale plans to install an omnimover attraction themed to the Defense Against the Dark Arts class with one shop and one restaurant in the former submarine lagoon at Magic Kingdom. She was also displeased with the lack of creative control she had and exited the deal. She went to Universal next and was also displeased with the initial plan to redress the Islands of Adventure's Lost Continent area. To remedy this, J. K. Rowling wrestled creative control from Universal and forced them to make the land a full scale, realistic re-creation of Hogsmeade and Hogwarts without being a refurbishment of an existing area. The project was announced in 2007 and in 2010 the land was opened to the public and made Universal Orlando.

The amusement park industry's offerings range from immersive theme parks such as Warner Bros. World Abu Dhabi, the Disneyland Resort and Universal Orlando Resort to thrilling coaster parks such as the Six Flags parks and United Parks & Resorts parks. Countless smaller ventures exist across the United States and around the world. Simpler theme parks directly aimed at smaller children have also emerged, such as Legoland.

Examples of amusement parks in shopping malls exist in West Edmonton Mall, Pier 39 and Mall of America.

Family fun parks starting as miniature golf courses have begun to grow to include batting cages, go-karts, bumper cars, bumper boats and water slides. Some of these parks have grown to include even roller coasters, and traditional amusement parks now also have these competition areas in addition to their thrill rides.

In 2015, theme parks in the United States had a revenue of US$8 billion and theme parks in China had a revenue of US$4.6 billion, with China expected to overtake the United States by 2020.

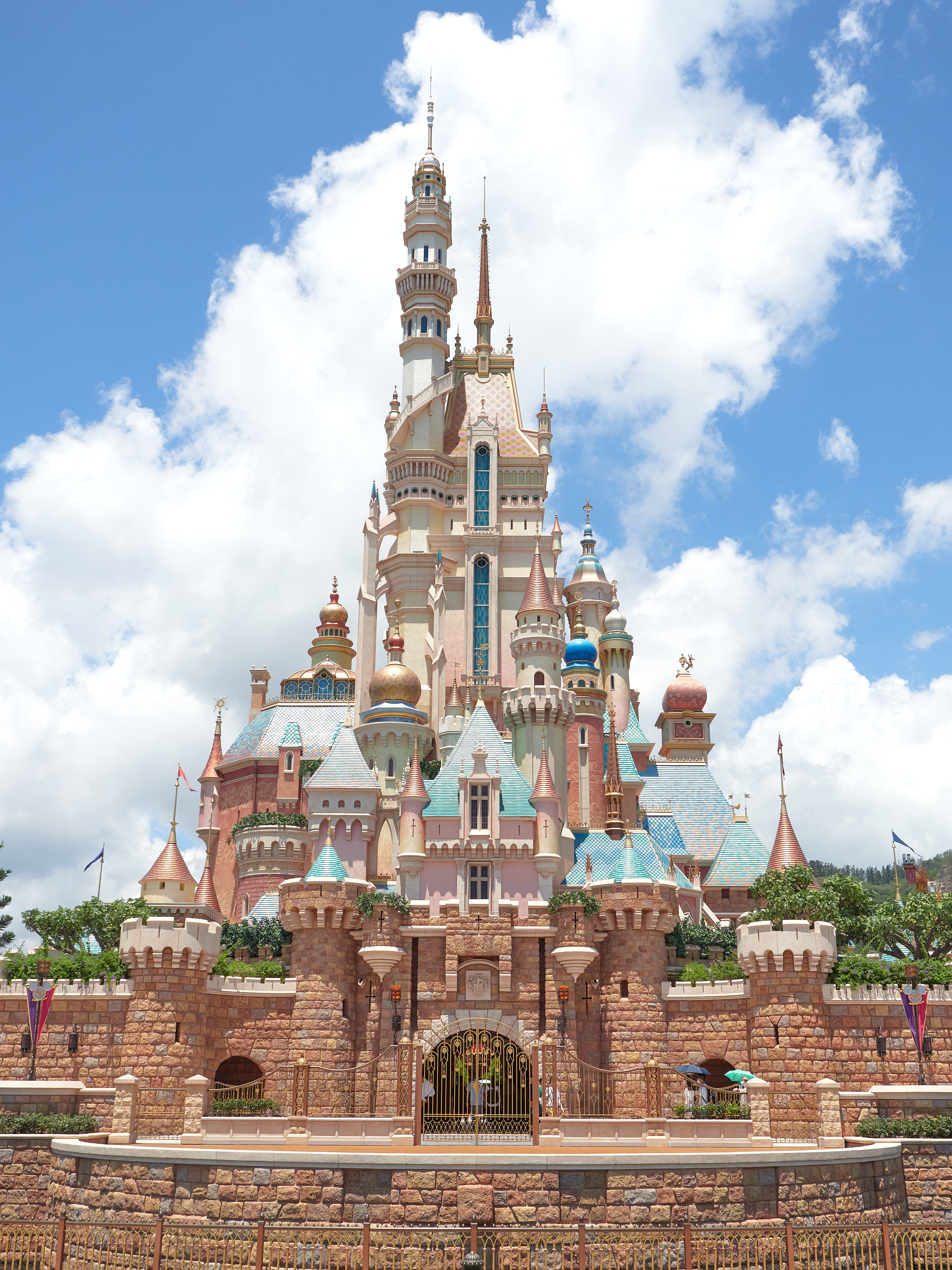
The castle of magical dreams at Hong Kong Disneyland

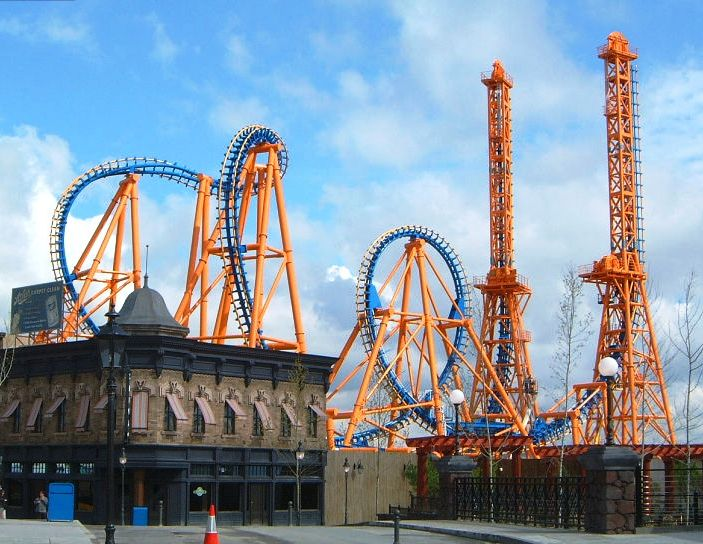
Stunt Fall at Parque Warner Madrid

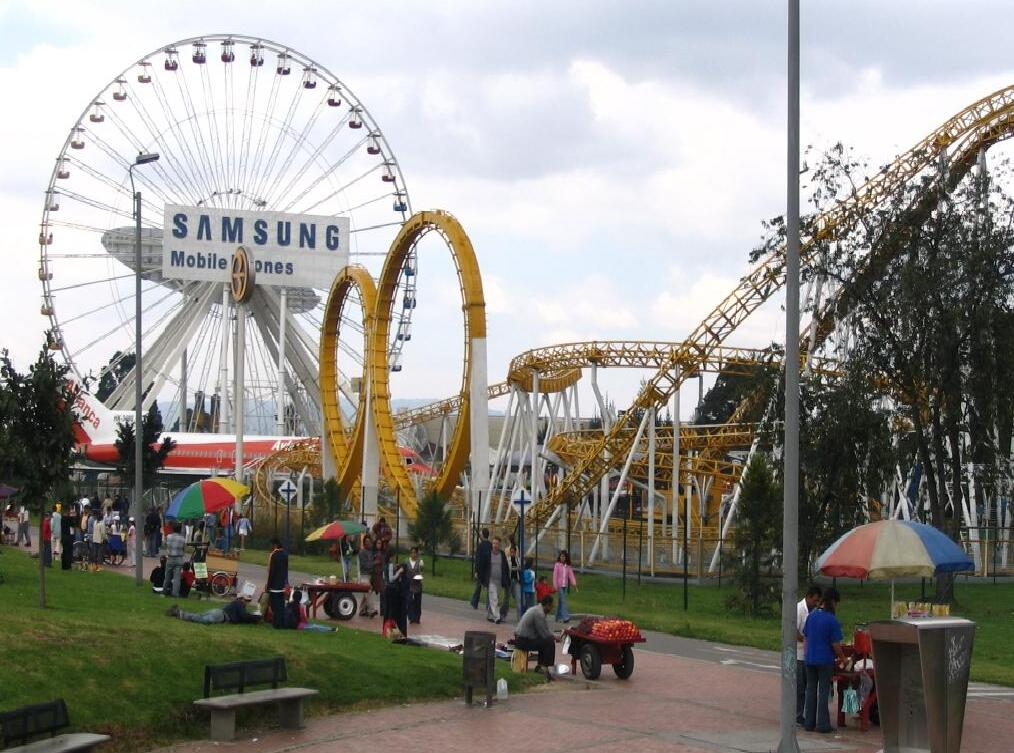
The Samsung Wheel and Double Loop Roller Coaster at Salitre Mágico

== Other types of amusement park ==
=== Educational theme parks ===
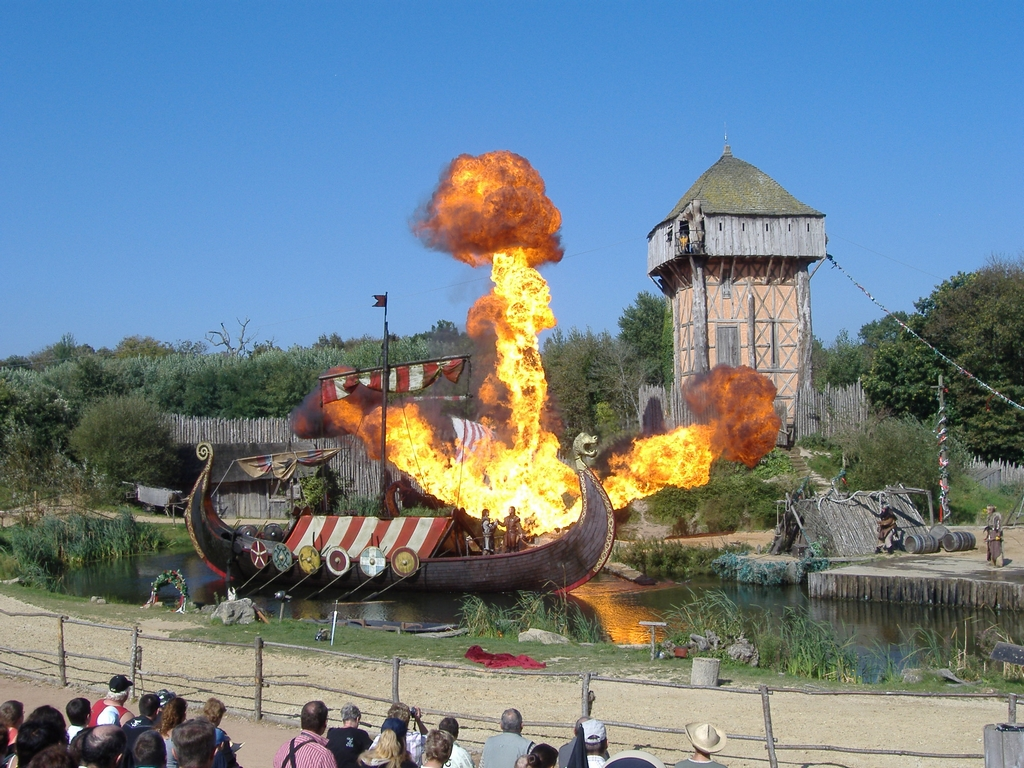
The historical theme park Puy du Fou in France won the 2014 Applause Award from the IAAPA

Some parks use rides and attractions for educational purposes. There are also Holy Land USA and the Holy Land Experience, which are theme parks built to inspire Christian piety. Dinosaur World entertains families with dinosaurs in natural settings, while the SeaWorld and Busch Gardens parks also offer educational experiences, with each of the parks housing several thousand animals, fish and other sea life in dozens of attractions and exhibits focusing on animal education.

Created in 1977, the Puy du Fou is a much-celebrated theme park in Vendée, France. It is centered around European, French and local history. It received several international prizes.

=== Family-owned theme parks ===
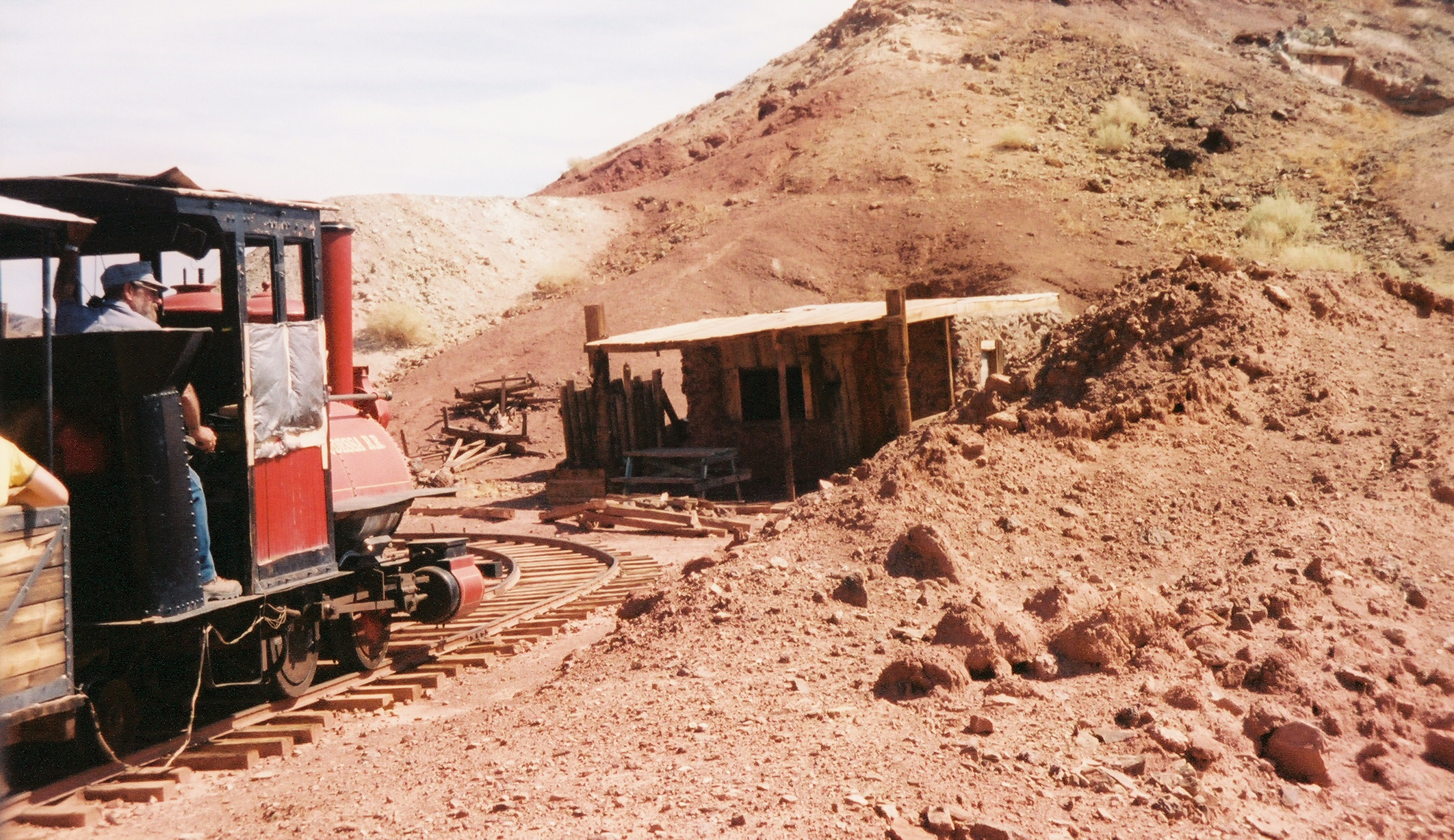
Narrow-gauge mining train going through Calico Ghost Town

Some theme parks did evolve from more traditional amusement park enterprises, such as Knott's Berry Farm. In the 1920s, Walter Knott and his family sold berries from a roadside stand, which grew to include a restaurant serving fried chicken dinners. Within a few years, lines outside the restaurant were often several hours long. To entertain the waiting crowds, Walter Knott built a Ghost Town in 1940, using buildings relocated from real old west towns such as the Calico, California, ghost town and Prescott, Arizona. In 1968, the Knott family fenced the farm, charged admission for the first time, and Knott's Berry Farm officially became a theme park. Because of its long history, Knott's Berry Farm currently claims to be "America's First Theme Park". Knott's Berry Farm is now owned by Six Flags Entertainment Company. Lake Compounce in Bristol, Connecticut, may be the true oldest continuously operating amusement park in the United States, open since 1846. Santa Claus Town, which opened in Santa Claus, Indiana, in 1935 and included Santa's Candy Castle and other Santa Claus-themed attractions is considered the first themed attraction in the United States: a precursor to the modern day theme park. Santa Claus Land (renamed Holiday World in 1984) opened in 1946 in Santa Claus, Indiana, and many people will argue that it was the first true Theme Park despite Knott's history. In the 1950s the Herschend family took over operation of the tourist attraction, Marvel Cave near Branson, Missouri. Over the next decade they modernized the cave, which led to large numbers of people waiting to take the tour. The Herschend family opened a recreation of the old mining town that once existed atop Marvel Cave. The small village eventually became the theme park, Silver Dollar City. The park is still owned and operated by the Herschends and the family has several other parks including Dollywood, Kentucky Kingdom and Wild Adventures.

=== Regional parks ===
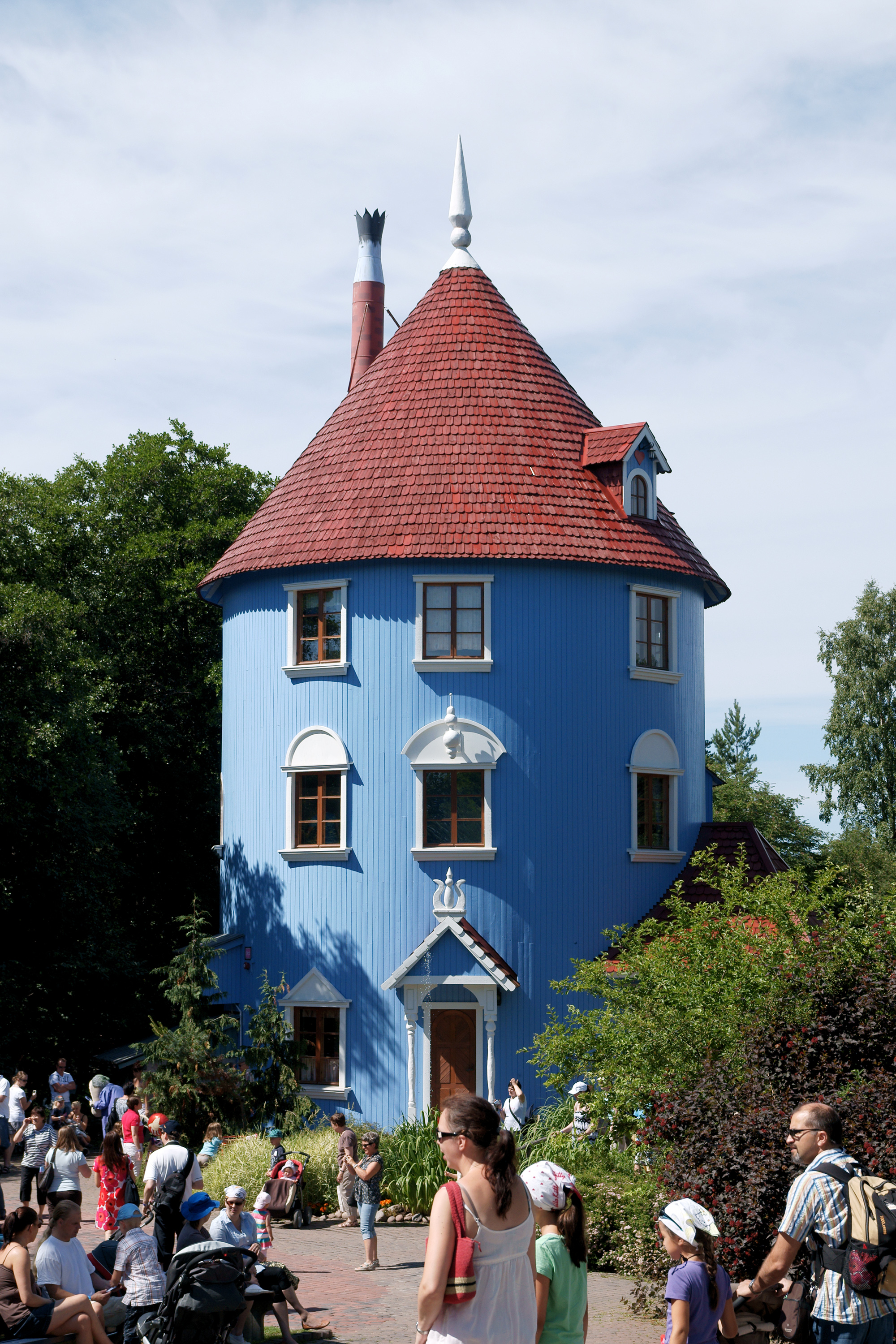
Moomin World theme park in Naantali, Finland

The first regional amusement park, as well as the first Six Flags park, Six Flags Over Texas was officially opened in 1961 in Arlington, Texas. The first Six Flags amusement park was the vision of Angus Wynne Jr. and helped create the modern, competitive amusement park industry. In the late 1950s, Wynne visited Disneyland and was inspired to create an affordable, closer, and larger amusement park that would be filled with fantasy. He followed in the steps of Disney and had subdivisions within the park that reflected different lands. The subdivisions included the Old South and other sections that referenced Wynne's background. By 1968, the second Six Flags park, Six Flags Over Georgia, opened, and in 1971, Six Flags Over Mid-America (now Six Flags St. Louis) opened near St. Louis, Missouri. Also in 1971, was the opening of the Walt Disney World resort complex in Florida. In 1985, a theme park called Santa Claus Village was opened in Rovaniemi, Finland near the Arctic Circle, which led the city to trademark itself as the "official hometown of Santa Claus" in 2009. In 1991, Warner Bros. in partnership with Village Roadshow, opened their own Warner Bros. Movie World. It is the only Movie-Related theme park in Australia. Warner Bros. continued their theme park ventures and opened Warner Bros. World Abu Dhabi in UAE and Parque Warner Madrid in Spain.

== Admission prices and admission policies ==
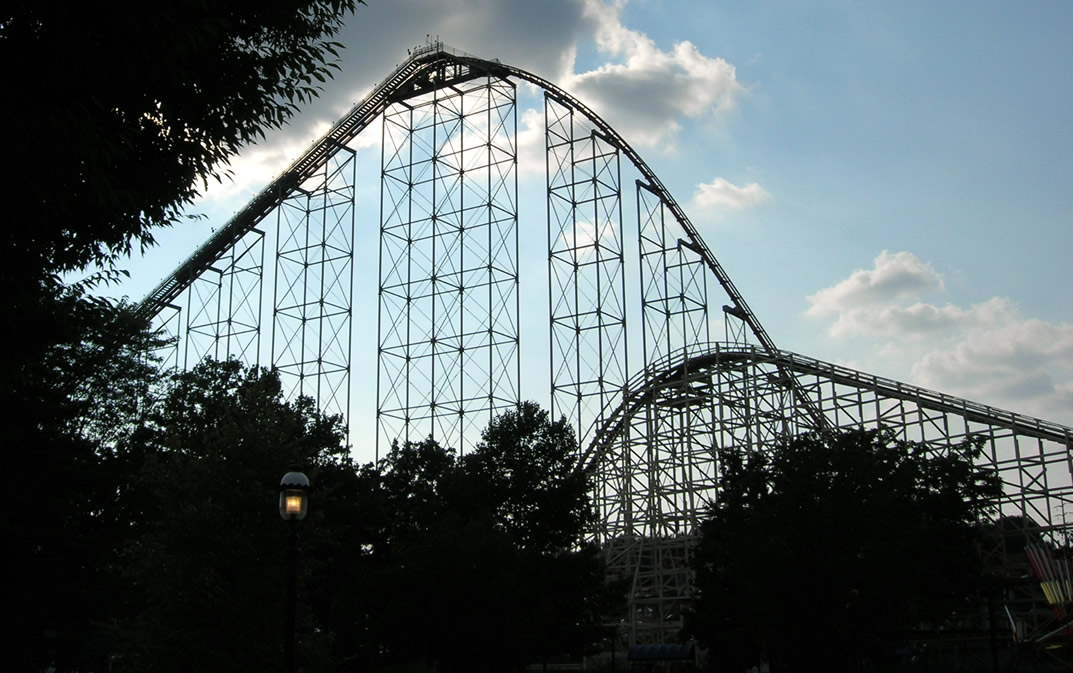
Steel Force (left) and Thunderhawk (right), two roller coasters at Dorney Park & Wildwater Kingdom in Allentown, Pennsylvania. At 5,600 feet (1,700 m) in length, Steel Force is the eighth-longest steel roller coaster in the world; it has a first drop of 205 feet (62 m) and a top speed of 75 miles per hour (121 km/h).

Amusement parks collect much of their revenue from admission fees paid by guests attending the park. Other revenue sources include parking fees, food and beverage sales and souvenirs.

Practically all amusement parks operate using one of these two admission principles:

=== Pay-as-you-go ===
In amusement parks using the pay-as-you-go scheme, guests enter the park at little or no charge. The guests are then required to purchase rides individually, either at the attraction's entrance or by purchasing ride tickets (or a similar exchange method, like a token). The cost of the attraction is often based on its complexity or popularity. For example, one guest might pay one ticket to ride a carousel, but four tickets to ride a roller coaster.

The park may allow guests to purchase a pass providing unlimited admissions to all attractions within the park for a specified duration of time. A wristband or pass is then shown at the attraction entrance to gain admission.

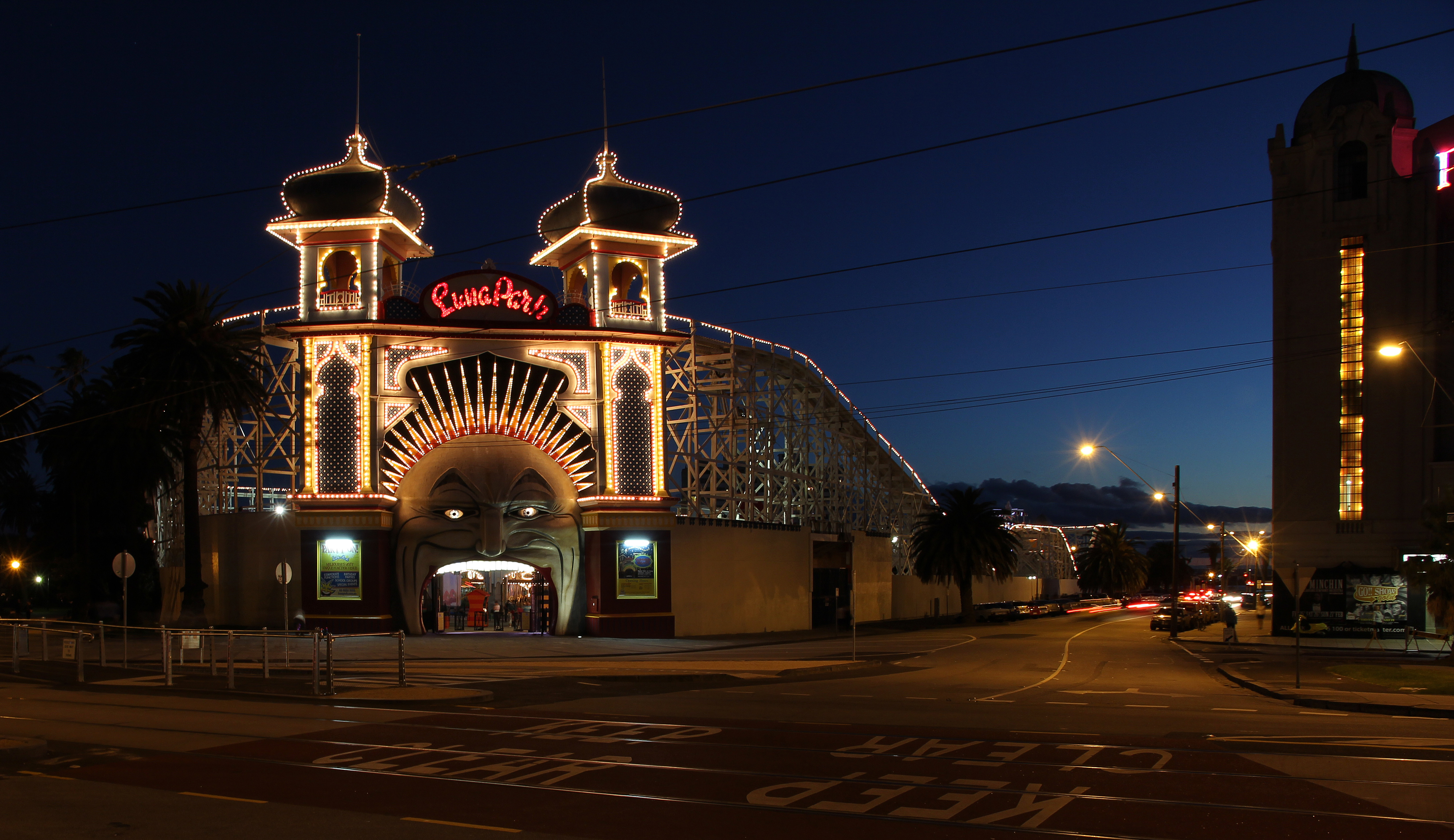
Melbourne Luna Park

Disneyland opened in 1955, using the pay-as-you-go format. Initially, guests paid the ride admission fees at the attractions. Within a short time, the problems of handling such large amounts of coins led to the development of a ticket system that, while now out of use, is still part of the amusement-park lexicon. In this new format, guests purchased ticket books that contained a number of tickets, labeled "A", "B" and "C". Rides and attractions using an "A-ticket" were generally simple, with "B-tickets" and "C-tickets" used for the larger, more popular rides. Later, the "D-ticket" was added, then finally the "E-ticket", which was used on the biggest and most elaborate rides, like Space Mountain. Smaller tickets could be traded up for use on larger rides, for example two or three A-tickets would equal a single B-ticket. Disneyland, as well as the Magic Kingdom at Walt Disney World, eventually abandoned this practice in 1982.

=== Pay-one-price ===
An amusement park using the pay-one-price scheme charges guests a single admission fee. Guests are subsequently given access to most of the attractions, usually including flagship roller coasters, in the park as often as they wish during their visit. A daily admission pass, also called a day pass, is the most basic fare on offer, with alternatives including season tickets which offer holders admission for the entire operating year (plus special privileges for the newest attractions), and express passes which give holders priority in bypassing lineup queues for the more popular attractions.

Parks with a pay-one-price admission format often have attractions that are not included in the admission charge; these are called "up-charge attractions" and may include Skycoasters or go-kart tracks, or games of skill where prizes are won. All Warner Bros. Theme Parks, including Warner Bros. Movie World, Warner Bros. World, and Parque Warner Madrid, follow this scheme.

When Angus Wynne, founder of Six Flags Over Texas, first visited Disneyland upon its opening in 1955, he noted that park's pay-as-you-go format as a reason to make his park pay-one-price. He thought that a family would be more likely to visit his park if they knew, up front, how much it would cost to attend.

== Rides and attractions ==
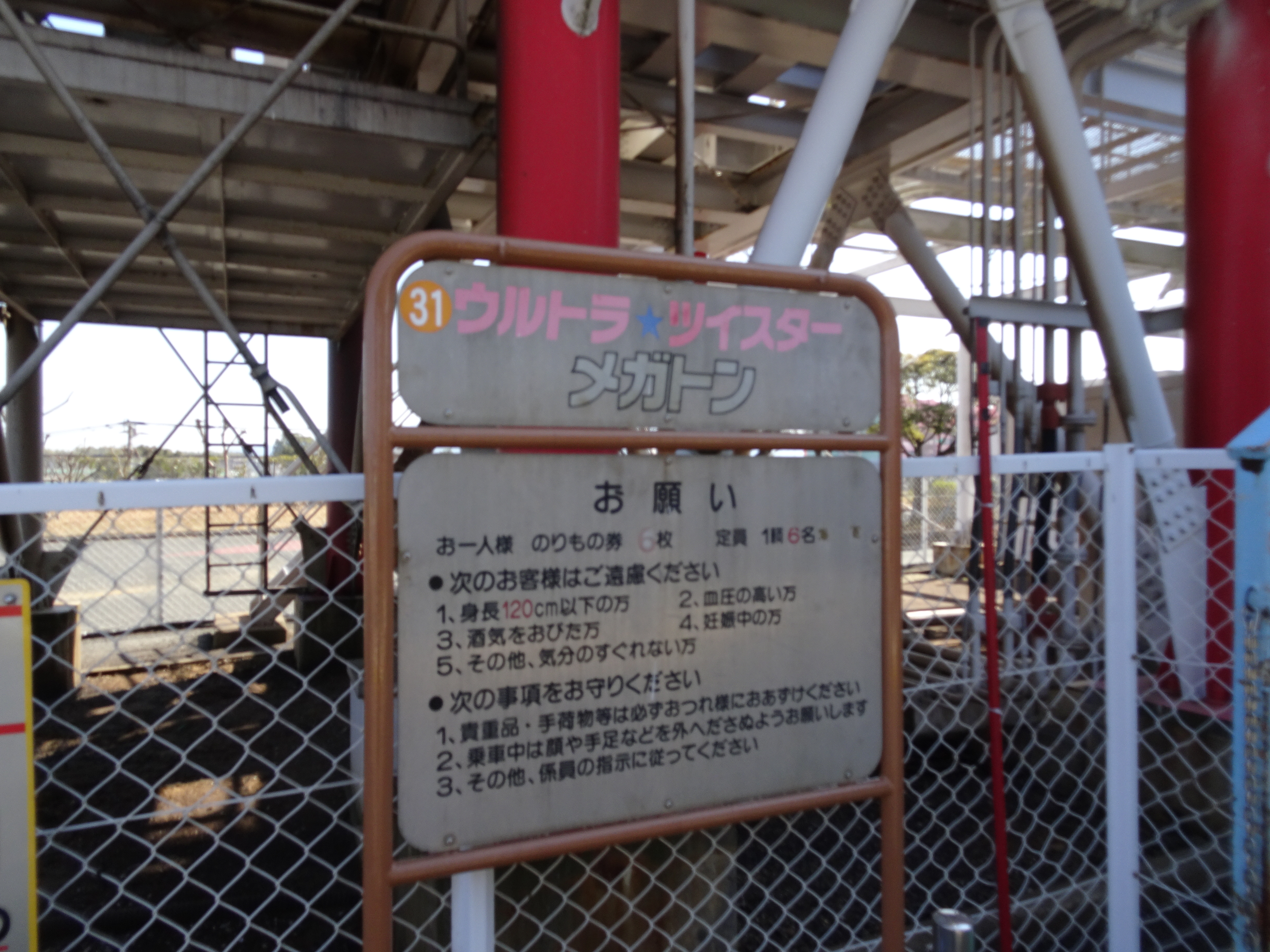
Minimum height requirement sign

Mechanized thrill rides are a defining feature of amusement park attractions. Early rides include the carousel, which originally developed from cavalry training methods first used in the Middle Ages. By the 19th century, carousels were common in parks around the world. Another such ride which shaped the future of the amusement park was the roller coaster. The origins of roller coasters can be traced back to 17th-century Russia, where gravity-driven attractions, which at first only consisted of individual sleds or carts riding freely down chutes on top of specially constructed snow slopes with piles of sand at the bottom for braking, were used as winter leisure activities. These crude and temporarily built curiosities, known as Russian Mountains, were the beginning of the search for even more thrilling amusement park rides. The Columbian Exposition of 1893 was a particularly fertile testing ground for amusement rides and included some that the public had never seen before, such as the world's first Ferris wheel, one of the most recognized products of the fair. In the present day, many rides of various types are set around a specific theme.

Parks contains a mixture of attractions which can be divided into several categories.

=== Flat rides ===
Flat rides are usually considered to be those that move their passengers in a plane generally parallel to the ground.

There is a core set of flat rides which most amusement parks have, including the Enterprise, Tilt-A-Whirl, Gravitron, chairswing, swinging inverter ship, twister, and top spin. However, there is constant innovation, with new variations on ways to spin and throw passengers around appearing in an effort to keep attracting customers. Manufactures such as Huss and Zamperla specialise in creating flat rides among other amusement attractions.

=== Roller coasters ===
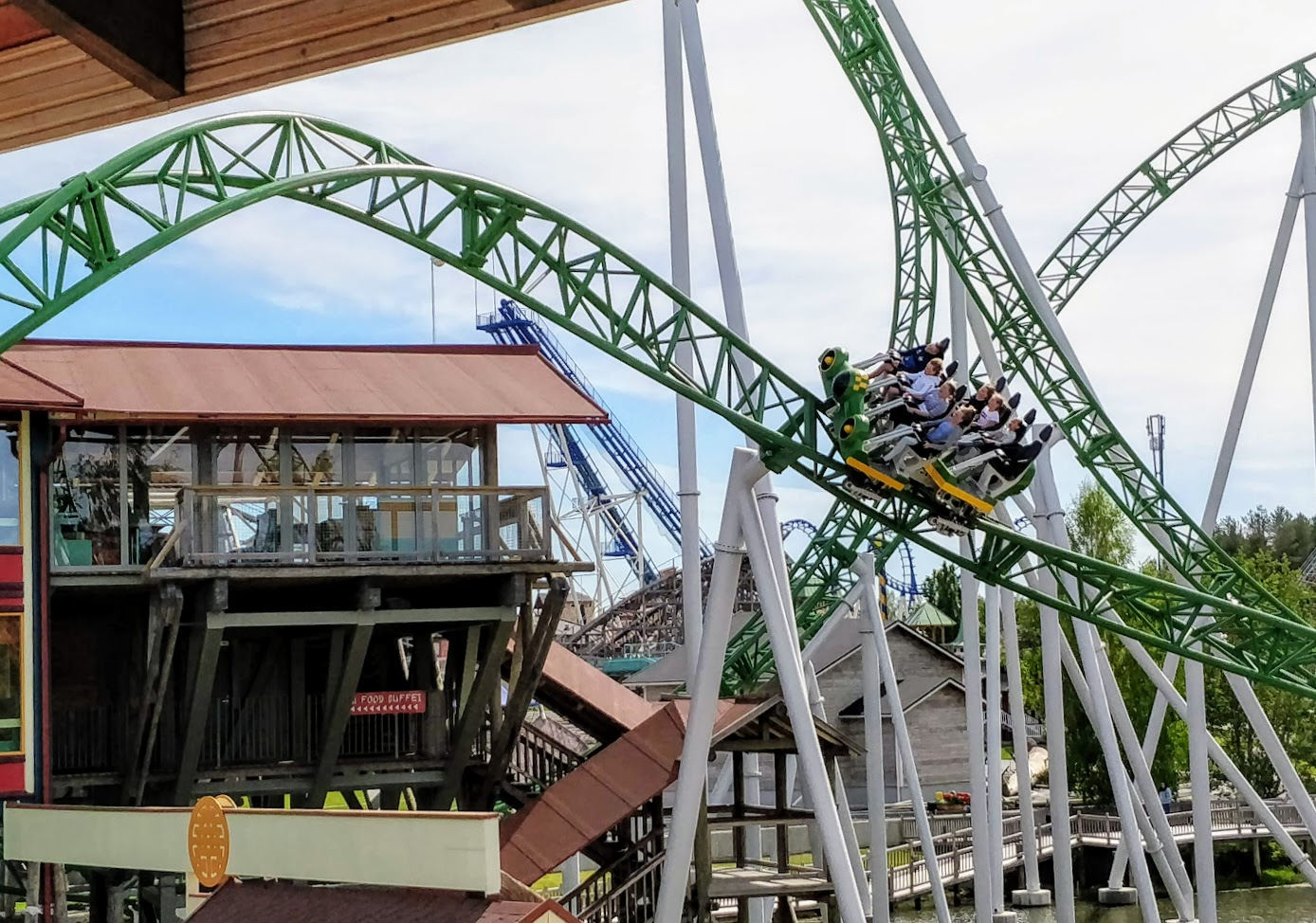
The Junker roller coaster at the PowerPark amusement park in Kauhava, Finland

Amusement parks often feature multiple roller coasters of primarily timber or steel construction. Fundamentally, a roller coaster ride is one in which a specialized railroad system with steep drops and sharp curves, passengers sit and are restrained in cars, usually with two or more cars joined to form a train. Some roller coasters feature one or more inversions (such as vertical loops) which turn the riders upside down. Over the years there have been many roller coaster manufacturers with a variety of types of roller coasters.

Manufacturers today include:

- Bolliger & Mabillard
- Gerstlauer
- The Gravity Group
- Great Coasters International
- Intamin
- Mack Rides
- Maurer AG
- Premier Rides
- Rocky Mountain Construction
- S&S - Sansei Technologies
- Vekoma
- Zamperla
- Zierer

=== Railways ===
Amusement park railways have had a long and varied history in American amusement parks as well as overseas. Some of the earliest park trains were not really trains; they were trolleys, which brought park patrons to the parks on regular rail lines from the cities to the end of the rail lines where the parks were located. Some older parks, such as Kennywood in Pennsylvania, were referred to as trolley parks. The earliest park trains that only operated on lines within the park's boundaries, such as the one on the ridable miniature Zephyr Railroad at Dorney Park & Wildwater Kingdom, were mostly custom-built. A few parks trains, including Disneyland Railroad, Walt Disney World Railroad, and Dollywood Express, operate using locomotives that had working careers on common carrier railways. Amusement park railways tend to be narrow-gauge, meaning the space between their rails is smaller than that of 4 ft 8 1/2 in (1,435 mm) standard gauge railroads. Some specific narrow gauges that are common on amusement park railroads are 3 ft (914 mm) gauge, 2 ft 6 in (762 mm) gauge, 2 ft (610 mm) gauge, and 15 in (381 mm) gauge.

Past and present manufacturers include:

- Allan Herschell Company
- Brookville Equipment Corporation
- Cagney Brothers
- Chance Rides
- Crown Metal Products
- Custom Fabricators
- Custom Locomotives
- Doppelmayr Garaventa Group
- Hurlbut Amusement Co.
- Miniature Train Co. (MTC)
- National Amusement Devices Co. (NAD)
- Ottaway
- Sandley
- Severn Lamb
- Tampa Metal Products
- Train Rides Unlimited
- Western Train Co.
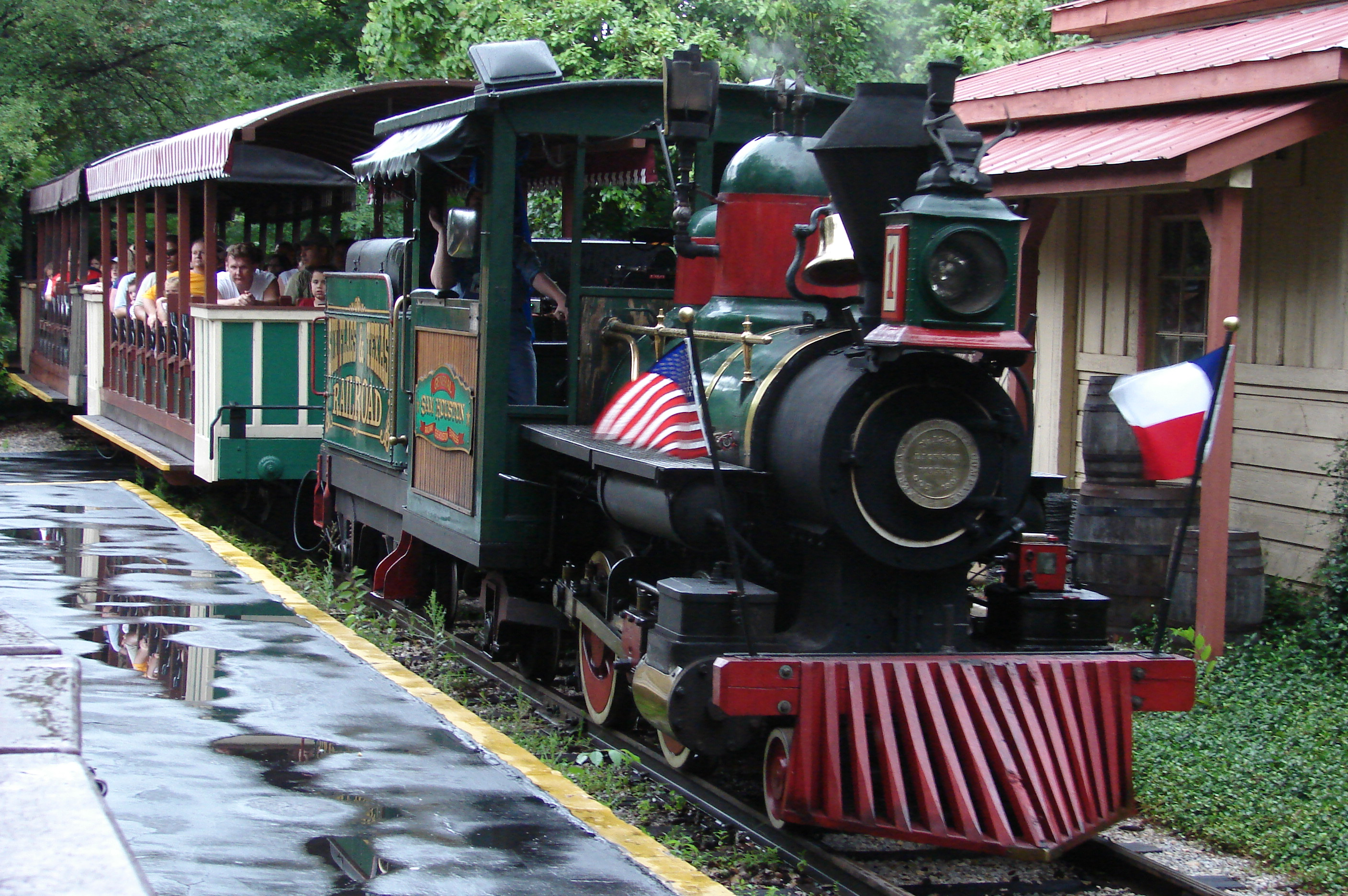
3 ft (914 mm) gauge Six Flags & Texas Railroad in operation in 2007

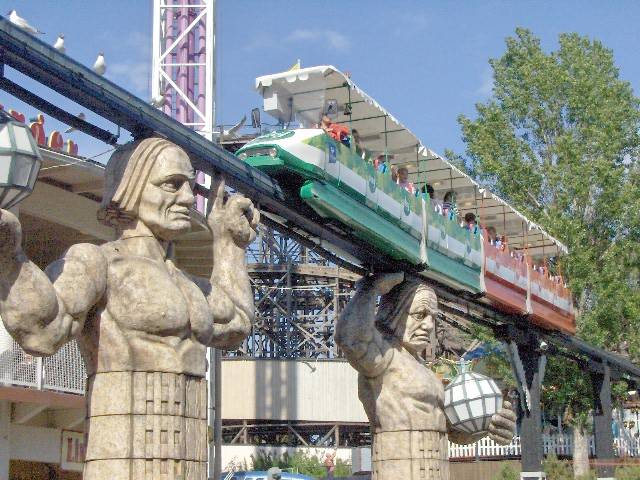
The Maisemajuna monorail from 1979 at the Linnanmäki amusement park in 2006

=== Water rides ===
Amusement parks with water resources generally feature a few water rides, such as the log flume, bumper boats, rapids and rowing boats. Such rides are usually gentler and shorter than roller coasters and many are suitable for all ages. Water rides are especially popular on hot days.

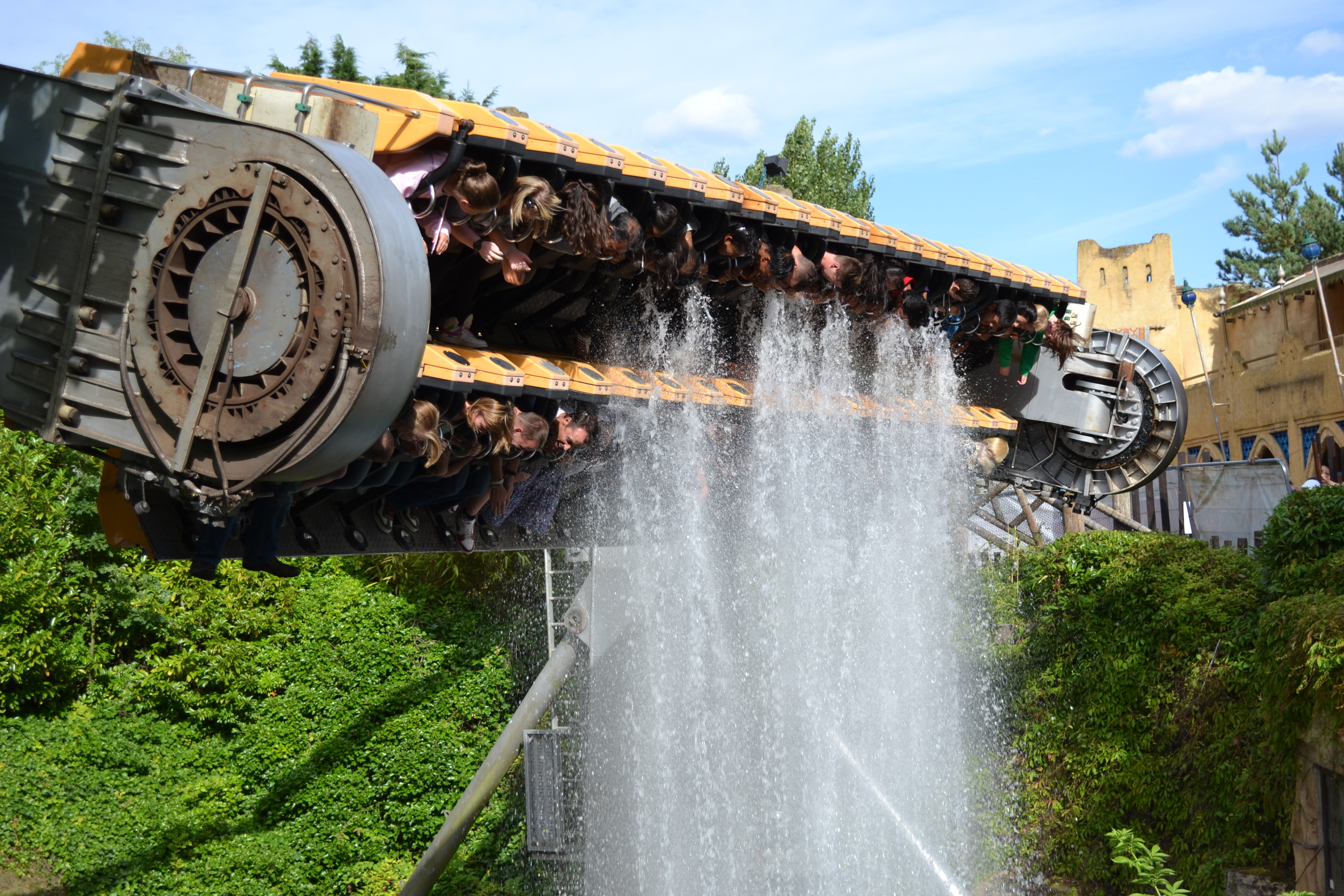
Rameses Revenge at Chessington World of Adventures, Greater London, was a Huss Top Spin ride and was the first of its kind to feature a water element

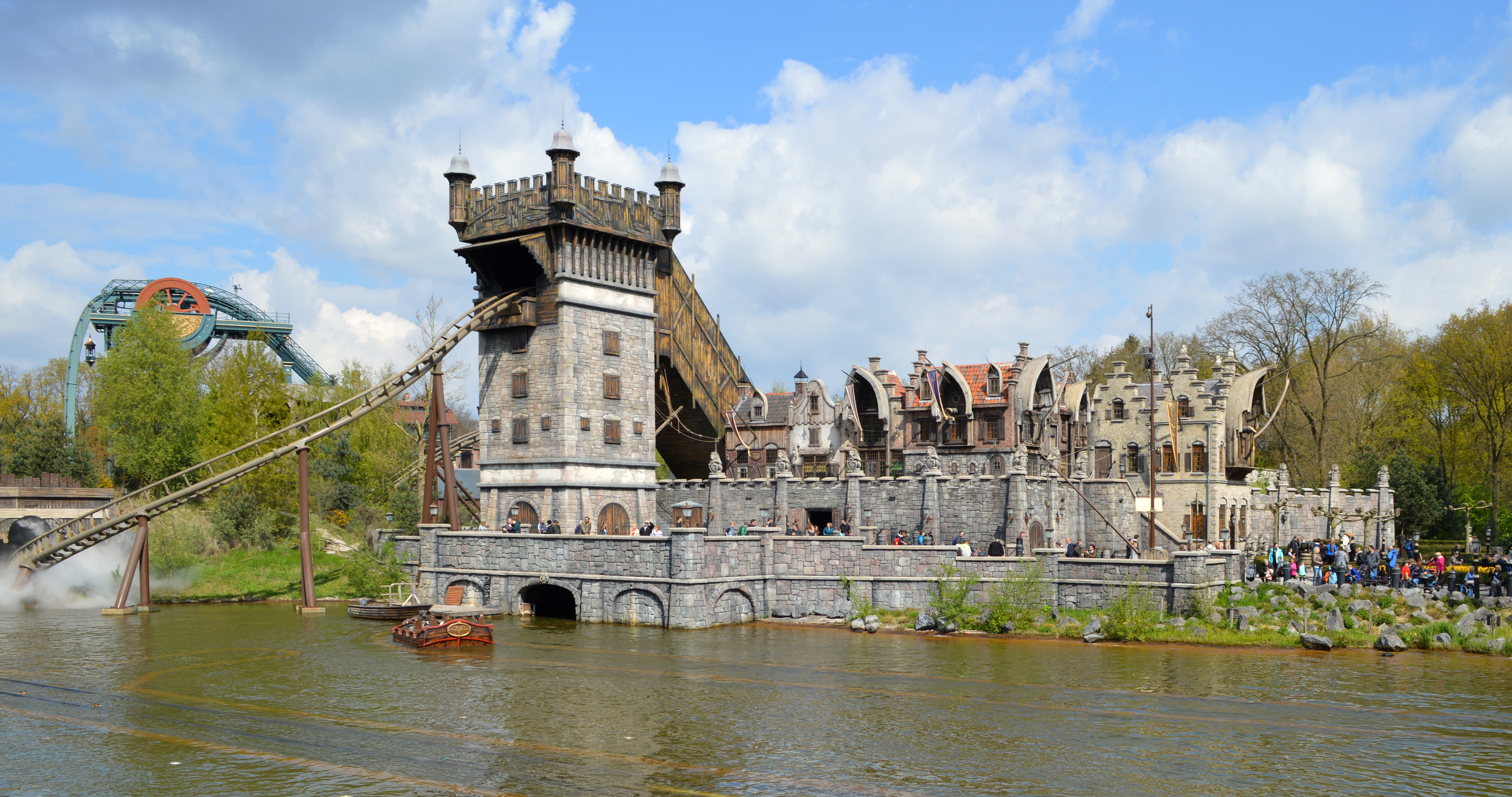
The Water coaster De Vliegende Hollander and in the back the Dive Coaster Baron 1898 in the Efteling

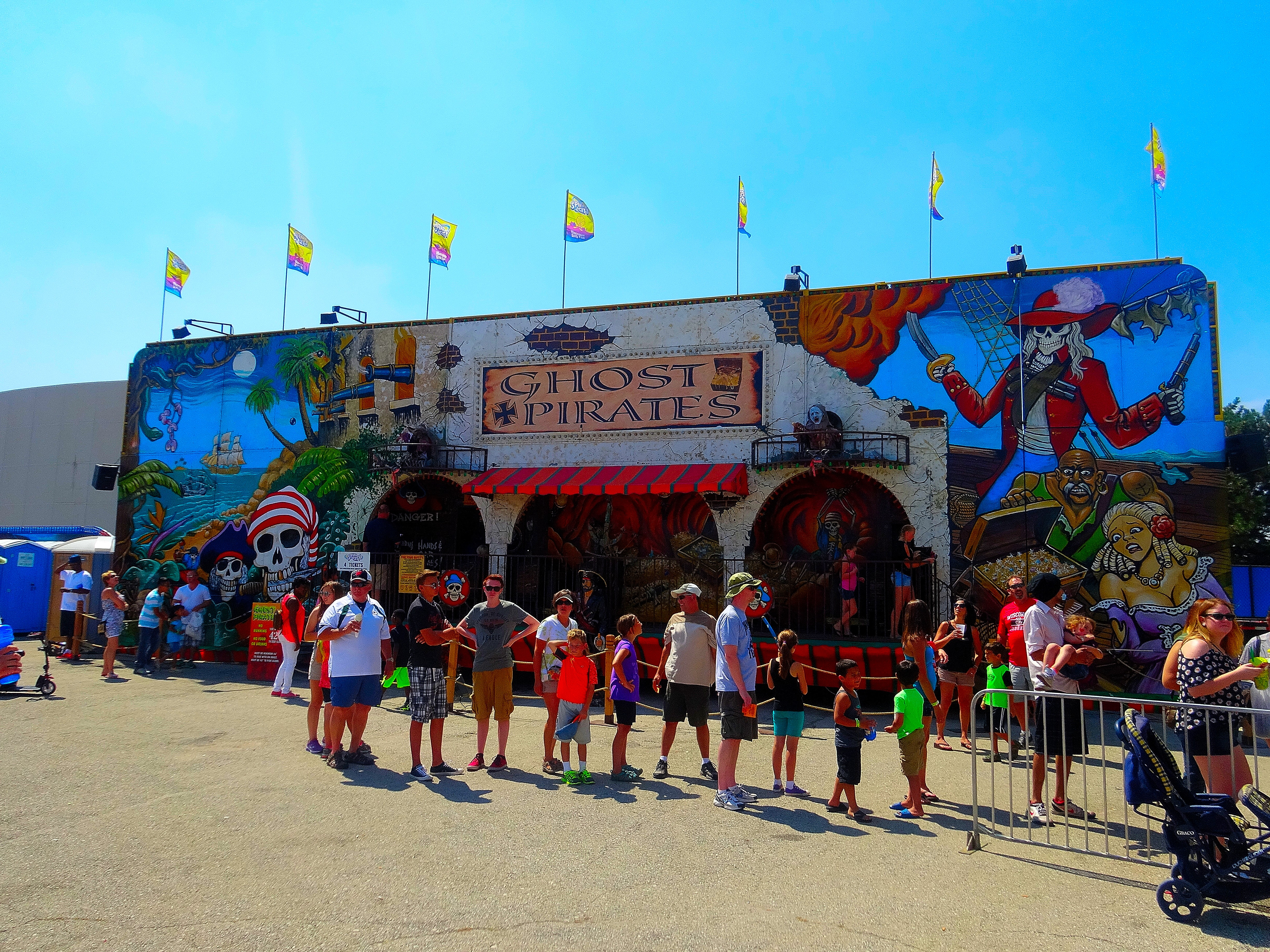
Ghost Pirate Dark Ride in Milwaukee County Fair

=== Dark rides ===
Overlapping with both train rides and water rides, dark rides are enclosed attractions in which patrons travel in guided vehicles along a predetermined path, through an array of illuminated scenes which may include lighting effects, animation, music and recorded dialogue, and other special effects.

=== Haunted houses ===
A haunted house is an attraction that intends to scare its guests for its thrill factor. It usually is overlapped with dark rides. Most open in the Halloween season but some are year-round. Most include actors, lighting, darkness, fog and animatronics.

=== Ferris wheels ===
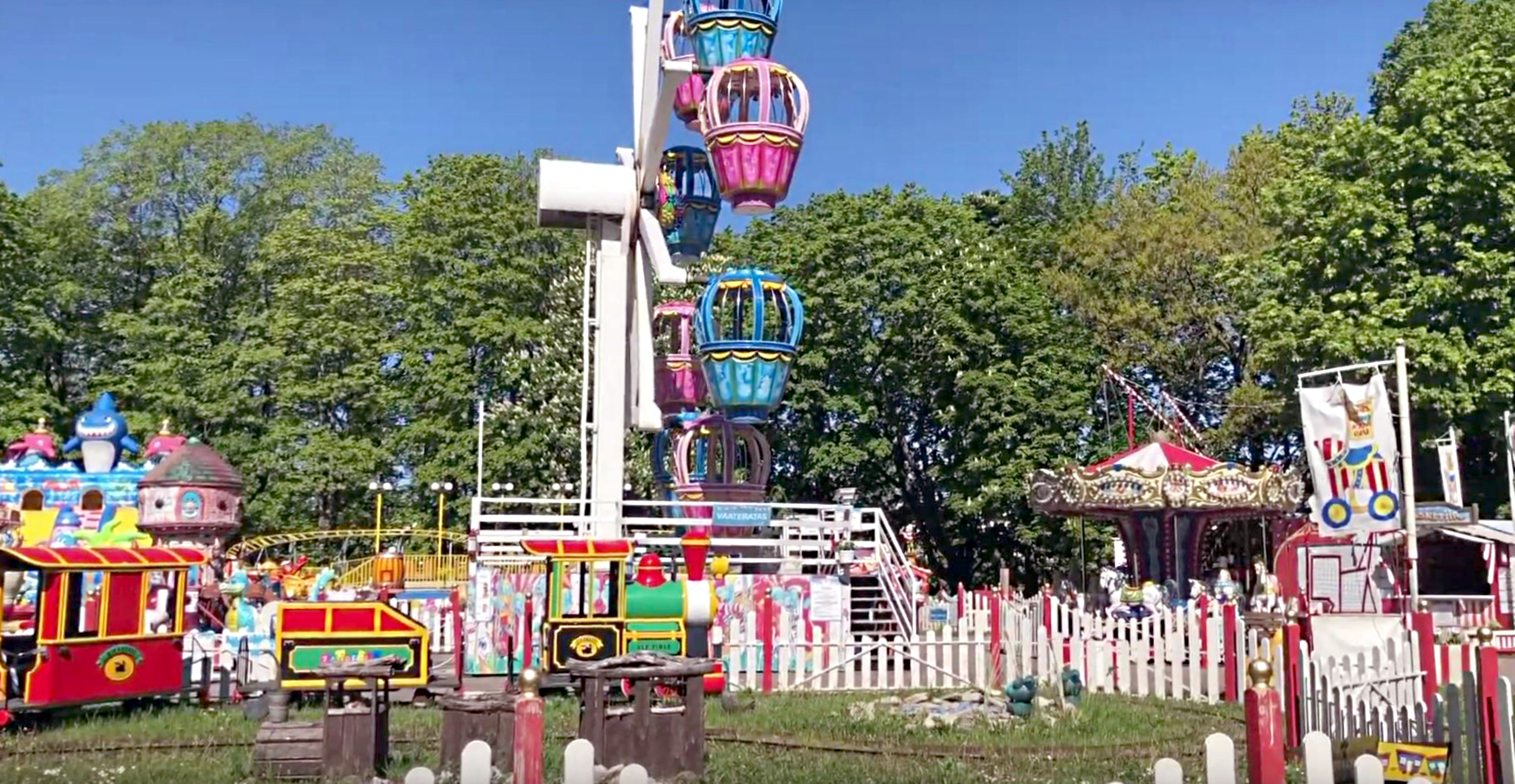
Ferris wheel at the Luna Luna Amusement Park in Tallinn, Estonia

Ferris wheels are the most common type of amusement ride at state fairs and county fairs in the US.

=== Transport rides ===
Transport rides are used to take large numbers of guests from one area to another, as an alternative to walking, especially for parks that are large or separated into distant areas. Transport rides include chairlifts, monorails, aerial trams, and escalators.

Ocean Park Hong Kong is well known for its 1.5-kilometre (0.9 mi) cable car connecting the Lowland and Headland areas of the park, and for having the world's second longest outdoor escalator in the Headland. Both transportation links provide scenic views of the park's hilly surroundings and, while originally intended for practicality rather than thrills or enjoyment, have become significant park attractions in their own right.

== Food ==
Schwenker on Volksfest in Germany

There are food stands at amusement parks which serve a variety of food and beverages. They offer snack items like cotton candy, ice cream, fried dough, funnel cake, candy apples or caramel apples and french fries. Meal items may include pizza, hamburgers, hot dogs, and chicken. Beverages may include soda, coffee, tea, and lemonade. Junk food items like deep fried candy bars, the deep-fried Twinkie, Dippin' Dots ice cream, the blooming onion, and "deep-fried butter on-a-stick" are some of the delicacies that can be found at food stands. Local and regional specialties, along with ethnic foods, are often available such as Empanadas and Tacos.

== See also ==
- Amusement arcade
- Beverly Park
- Family entertainment center
- Miniature park
- Water park
- Lists of amusement parks
