= Arat Kilo Monument =

Historic monument in Addis Ababa, Ethiopia

- የአራት ኪሎ ሀውልት
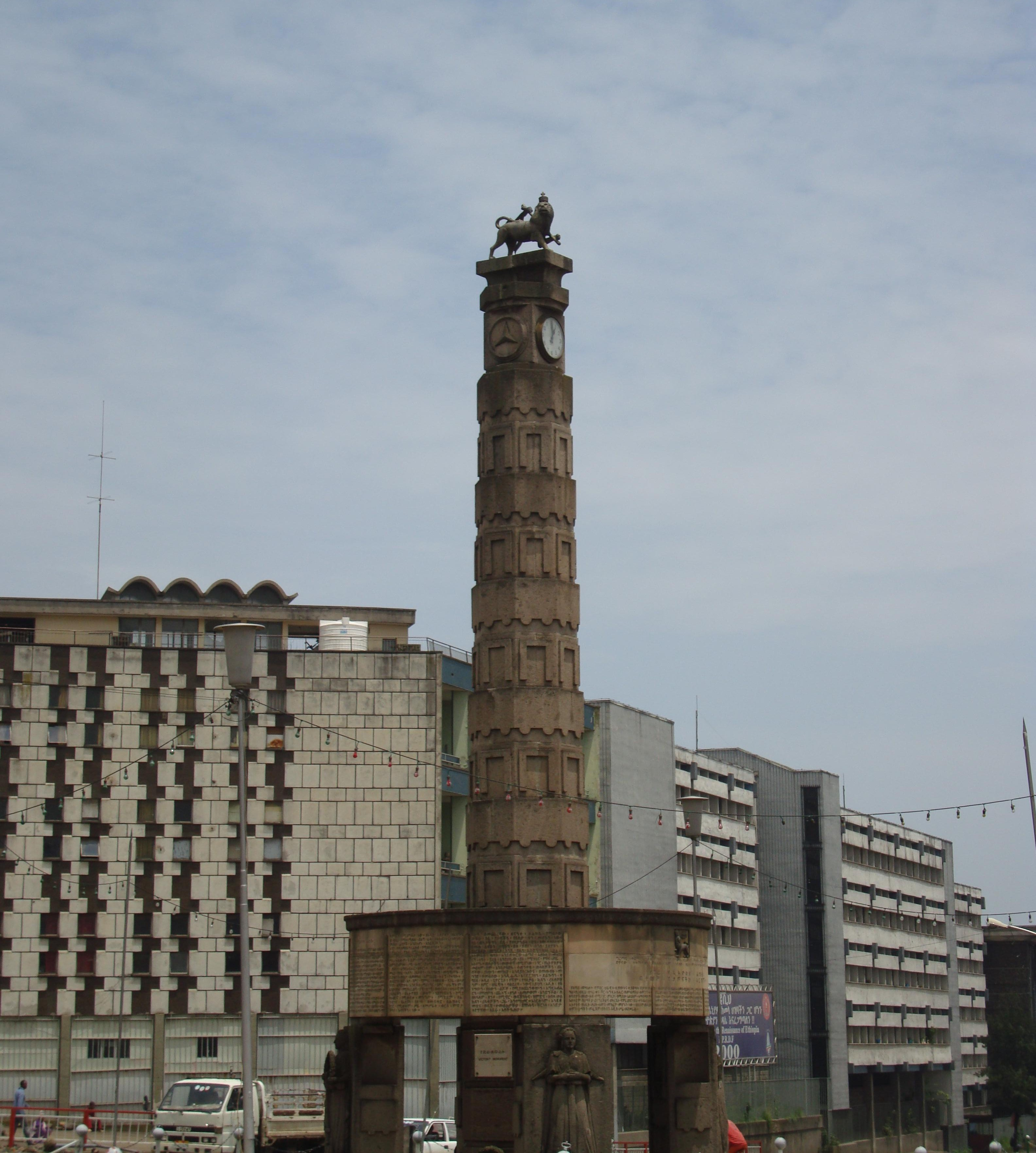
- Interactive map of Arat Kilo Monument
- Location: Adwa St, Meyazia 27 Square, Addis Ababa, Ethiopia
- Coordinates: 9°01′58″N 38°45′48″E
- Type: Monument
- Beginning date: 1930
- Restored date: 1949
- Dedicated to: Ethiopia's victory against Italian occupation
- Dismantled date: 1936

The Arat Kilo Monument (Amharic: የአራት ኪሎ ሀውልት) is a historic monument located in Adwa St, Arat Kilo, Addis Ababa, Ethiopia. The monument was built by Emperor Haile Selassie in 1930 during his coronation but removed during the Italian administration in 1936, and was restored in 1949 with decorations. The monument depicts the Ethiopian Lion of Judah at the top.

== Description ==
The Arat Kilo Monument was built by the order of Emperor Haile Selassie during his coronation in 1930. After the Italian occupation in 1936, the monument was toppled. The monument was restored in 1949 after its occupation decorated with reliefs dedicated to the Ethiopian victory during the occupation. The monument depicts the Ethiopian Lion of Judah at the top.

Arat Kilo Monument is located in main intersection of Meyazia 27 Square in Adwa Street area, surrounded by important landmarks, such as the headquarter of Ministry of Education, Addis Ababa University and the Holy Trinity Cathedral.
