= Ethiopian Patriotic Association =

Ethiopian national organization

The Ethiopian Patriotic Association is a national organization of all Ethiopians that is created to honour the gallant sons and daughters of Ethiopia who fought and defeated the Italian invading colonial power during the period of World War II. The association has been serving this purpose the past 60 years and stayed a symbol of national sovereignty. The association was founded in January 1931, in Amhara region North Shewa zone particularly at a place called 'Andit Girar' (አንዲት ግራር) under patronage of Ras Abebe Aragay.

'Andit Girar' (አንዲት ግራር) is located in the current administration of Moja and Wodera (ሞጃና ወደራ) woreda, Segat Jingodo kebele (ሰጋጥ ጅንጎዶ) of North Shewa zone. It is located at the heart and fertile land of Ankelafign (አንቀላፊኝ) on the road from Sasit (ሳሲት) to Gawuna (ጋውና).
