= Meyazia 27 Square =

Place in Addis Ababa, Ethiopia

- ሚያዚያ 27 አደባባይ (Amharic)
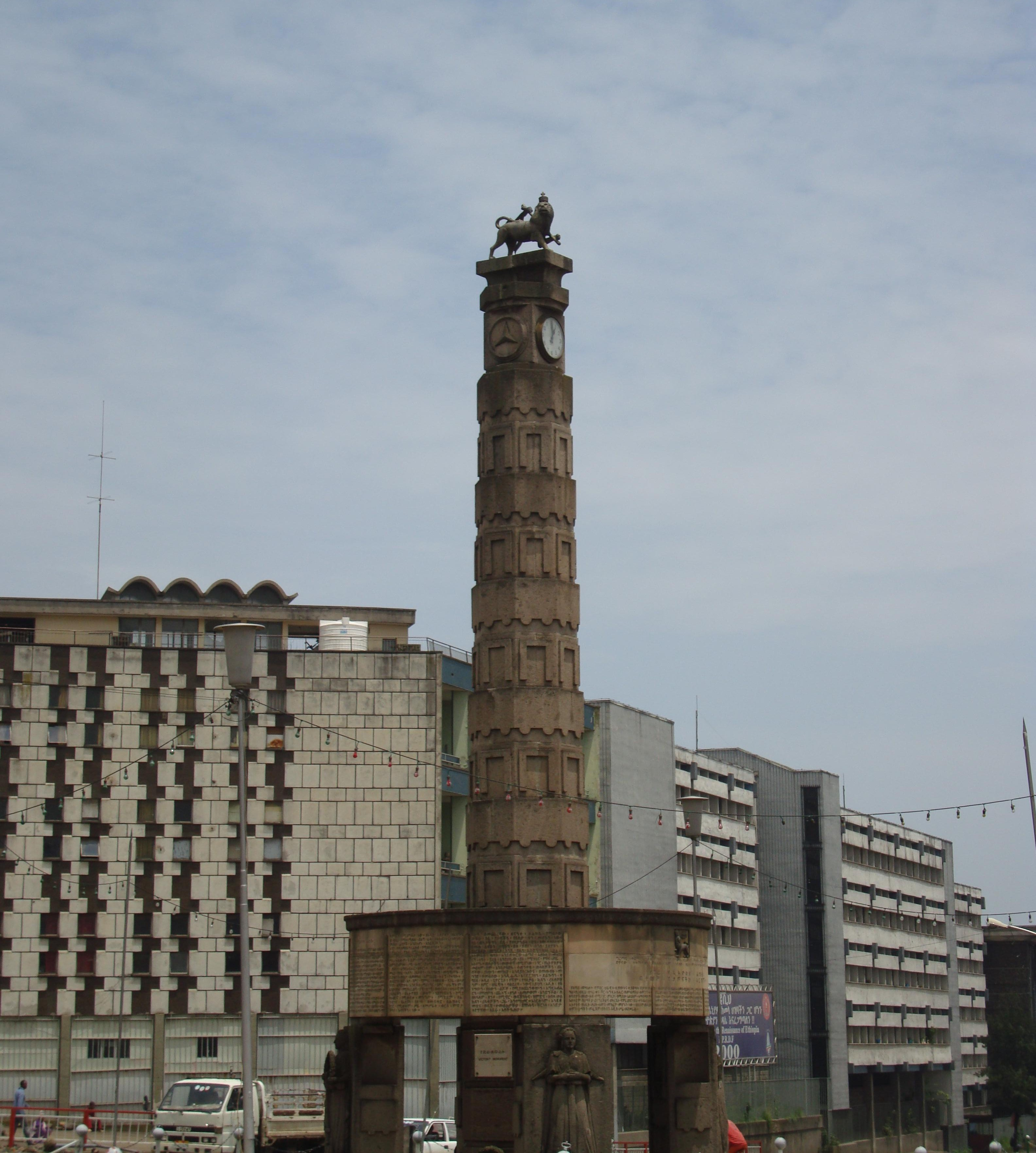
- The Arat Kilo Monument in Meyazia 27 Square
- Interactive map of Meyazia 27 Square
- 9°01′58″N 38°45′48″E
- Location: Addis Ababa, Ethiopia

History
- Built: 1930
- Demolished: 1936, 1974

Site notes
- Restored: 1990s

Meyazia 27 Square (Amharic: ሜያአዚያ 27 አደባባይ; or 5 May Square), commonly called Arat Kilo, is an important and historic intersection and surrounding neighborhood in Addis Ababa, Ethiopia, located where Adwa St, King George VI St, Queen Elizabeth II St, and Development Through Cooperation Ave come together. Its name denotes 27 Miyazya (5 May), both the day when Addis Ababa fell to Italy in 1936 and was liberated in 1941. The park is under the aegis of the Addis Ababa Land Development and Urban Renewal Agency.

Many buildings of the Ethiopian government and Addis Ababa University are near the square. The eastern side of the square is dominated by the Ministry of Education, the western side has Addis Ababa University Department of Computer Science and the Archaeology Museum. Among the heterogeneous assortment adjacent buildings are the Holy Trinity Cathedral, Parliament building, and Imperial Palace Building.

== History ==
Meyazia 27 Square is noted for its impressive monument built for Emperor Haile Selassie's coronation in 1930. The historic moment depicts a Lion of Judah and a circle of relief figures and monumental panels celebrating the liberation of Ethiopia. In 1936, during the occupation of Ethiopia by Fascist Italy, the monument was removed. Following the liberation of Ethiopia, the monument was rebuilt. After the Ethiopian Revolution, the Derg removed the relief of the Emperor Haile Selassie from the monument. After the end of the Ethiopian Civil War, the monument was restored.
