= Urban evolution of Addis Ababa =

Evolution of urbanization of Addis Ababa, the capital of Ethiopia

Urbanization of Addis Ababa began in late 19th century in a site of Finfinne inhabited by various Oromo clans, and Emperor Menelik II formed permanent settlement for his army and nobles. In 1881, he transferred his capital to Entoto, a vicinity area of Addis Ababa, ultimately relocated in Addis Ababa in 1886; he along with his wife Empress Taytu Betul founded it after finding Entoto undesirable due to its cold climate, and an abundance of hot mineral springs in Addis Ababa which were believed to have positive health effects. In the 1890s, Addis Ababa saw rapid population growth due to factors related to 1889–1892 famine and immigration to the area and mobilisation of traditional militias and other associated immigrants after the Battle of Adwa (1896).

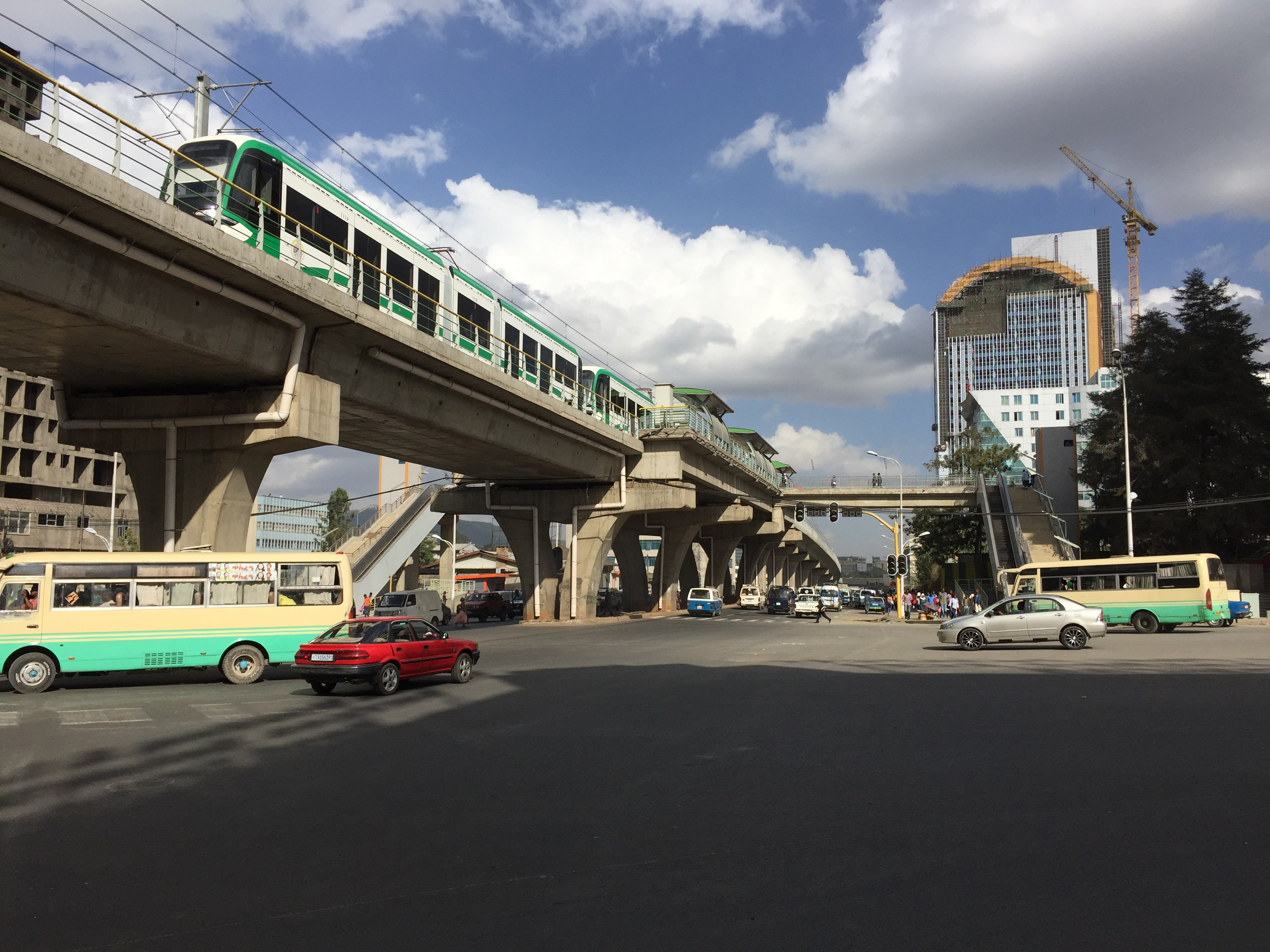
Addis Ababa's Meskel Square in 2015

Map of Addis Ababa with its 10 districts

The 1909 land act further transformed Addis Ababa into metropolitan area, therefore, shifted from safar to infrastructure settlement in 1910s and 1920s, and schools roads, hospitals and other infrastructure began developing. During the Italian occupation of the country (1936–1941), new master plan was developed by seven European architects in order beautify Addis Ababa as their colonial city by featuring monumental structure and public square for regime grandeur, with steady population growth. After their occupation, the British consulted, first, Sir Patrick Abercrombie in 1946 and, later, a French team led by architect Luis De Marien. From these consultations, monumental structures, infrastructures, and satellite towns to beautify Addis Ababa as the "capital of Africa" were planned. The Derg regime saw nationalization of extra house that prevent private investment, leading urban morphology to decline from 5% to 3.4%. The Hungarian planner C.K. Polonyi embarked the first master plan in this era based on structuring the suburbs and the inner-city. Along with the 1986 Italo-Ethiopian master plan, the plan ultimately met failure to implement due to lack of funds for infrastructural provision by the government. The revised 2003 master plan was intended to support the new government led by the Ethiopian People's Revolutionary Democratic Front (EPRDF) and its policies on market economy.

== Overview ==
Addis Ababa a is located at 9°2' north of equator and at 38°45' east, lying in average attitude of 2,500 meters above sea level. The northern part of the city including the Entoto Mountains is high about 3,000 meters above sea level. Addis Ababa is surrounded by Entoto Mountains to he north, Wechacha Mountains in the west, Yerer Mountain and other volcanic cones in the east and south. Despite lacking major river flowing across it, there are small rivers such as Kebena, Kurtumi, Ginfile, Kotebe, and Akaki flowing from north to south and make deep gorges to form a structured city. According to 2007 Consensus, the city's population reached to 2.74 million, comprising more than 30% of population in Ethiopia. Addis Ababa is the country's industrial, educational, administrative, financial and inter alia centers. The city also serves numerous international organizations of the continent such as the headquarters of United Nations Economic Commission for Africa and the African Union (AU).

Prior to 1974, the population growth rate of Addis Ababa was 6.5% and declined to 3.7% during the Derg rule. The rate again restored to 6.5% in current status.

== Early history ==
Before its establishment, the area was called Finfinne where various Oromo pastoralist inhabited the area. The area used hot spring where people of the area take bath or drink the water for health treatment. Abba E Foucher described the health effects "immediate purgative", while the water sprang up mixed with soil that contains sodium sulphate. Menelik's grandfather was one of person to visit Finfinne and interested with natural beauty with intention to build capital.

At the beginning of 1860s, the king confiscated pasture land from the Finfinne plain. This engendered Oromo revolt against the confiscation by distributing their land for ploughing and pasture in 1869. To stop the revolt, the king sent soldiers and successfully suppress it. The suppression and the establishment of Catholic mission at Birbirsa in the site of St George Church led Menelik II to transfer his capital to Entoto in 1881, used primarily a strategic garrison base for his army camp against tribal incursion. Due to coldy and windy climate and the presence of hot spring in the area, Menelik along with his wife Taytu Betul founded Addis Ababa in 1886, and the founding history of the city primarily related to the political administration of the empire starting in 1877.

In 1888, Menelik moved his permanent resident from Entoto to the place where his imperial palace was formed in 1887. Suggestions that bring Taytu to be credited with co-founding Addis Ababa was she guided military officials with their soldiers and widely the settlement regarded as "Taytu's plan". She also credited with the progenitor of urbanization in Addis Ababa. At the time, the settlement structure primarily consisted of cluster of residence, known commonly as safar to entice the officials and their followers.

The head of safar built their house above elevation of the grand palace for strategic purpose, and also notes by the titular noble rank such as Ras, Dejazemach and Fitawrari. The second cluster included churches. Between 1884 and 1903, ten churches were built that was occupied by safar previously. Menelik and his nobles then proceed to build churches near his palace to concentrate large settlement around it. Along with the original morphology, these settlement have changed environmental impact and the development of the city.

=== Rapid population growth and the 1890s problems ===
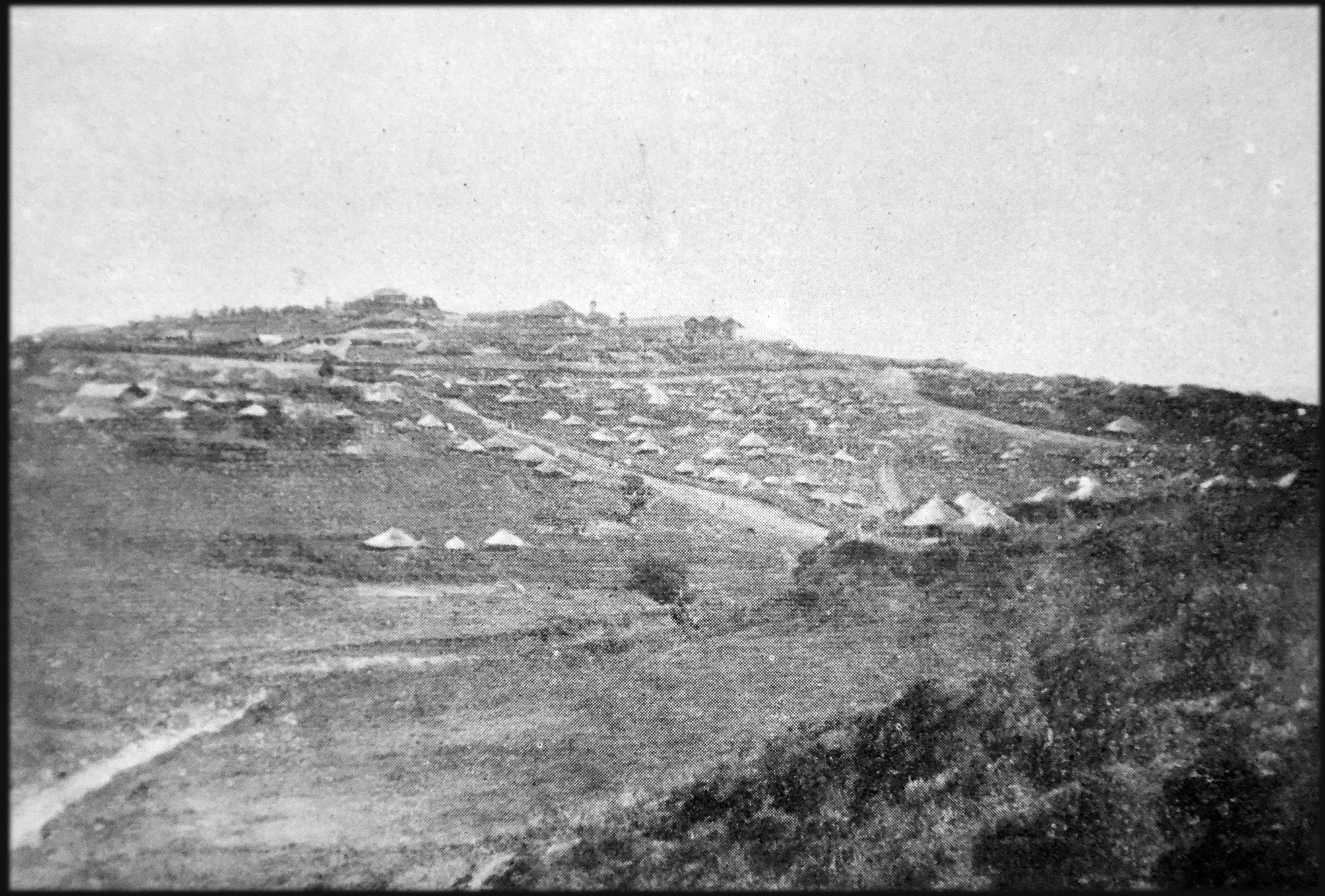
Distant view of Menelik Palace with respective settlement cluster

In 1890s, Addis Ababa experienced rapid population growth into two factors: the 1889–1892 famine, a mass immigration to Addis Ababa and the Battle of Adwa after which traditional militias and other immigrants began settling in the city. Wood resource shortage took these population to shift southern region in Addis Alem which situated 40 km from Addis Ababa. Luckily, there was importation of seedlings of eucalyptus tree from Australia which helped to reduce the scarcity and allowed a permanent settlement. The other reason to strengthen settlement was the use of long distance trade that paved the way to commercial services. After the Battle of Adwa, the route to sea ports was stabilized with construction of railway line between 1896 and 1917.

Gradually, it has shown the importance of the Emperor or Empress in import-export activities dominated by foreign countries. The commercial development has been observed around Arada area.

=== 1909 land charter ===
The 1909 land charter boosted an establishment of municipality in Addis Ababa as well as spatial safar growth led transformation into larger metropolitan area despite still unsupported by the contemporary planning. During 1910s and 1920s, there were significant improvements of modernization of infrastructure and services (roads, schools, hospitals, etc) that transformed original urban form. Thus, the development shifted from safar cluster system to infrastructure.

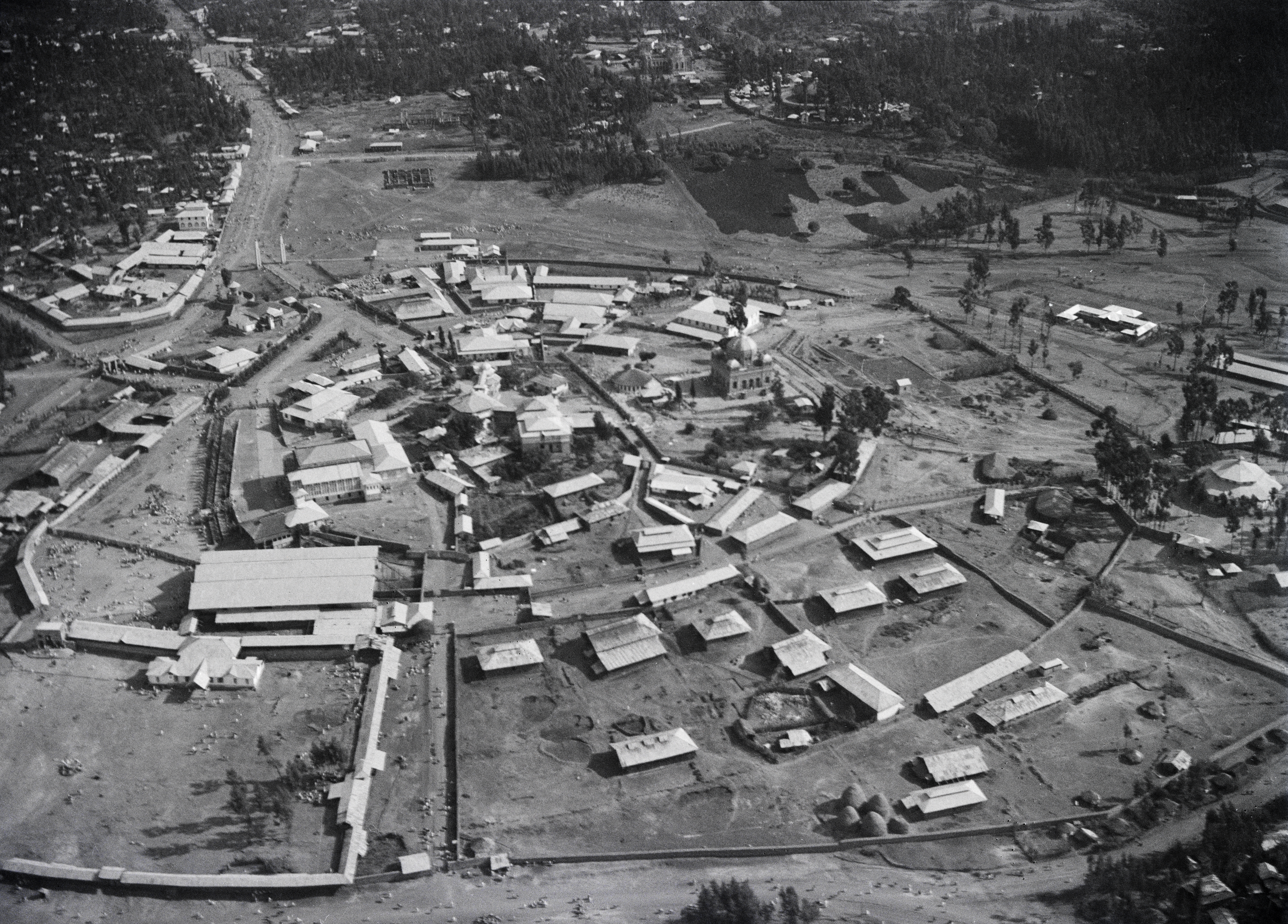
Addis Ababa landscape in 1934, from aerial view

The railway station established in 1917 became the third public area, next to Arada/Giyorgis and the gibbi. Addis Ababa growths was characterized by spontaneous, self-regulating without formal plan when in transformation.

== During Italian occupation ==
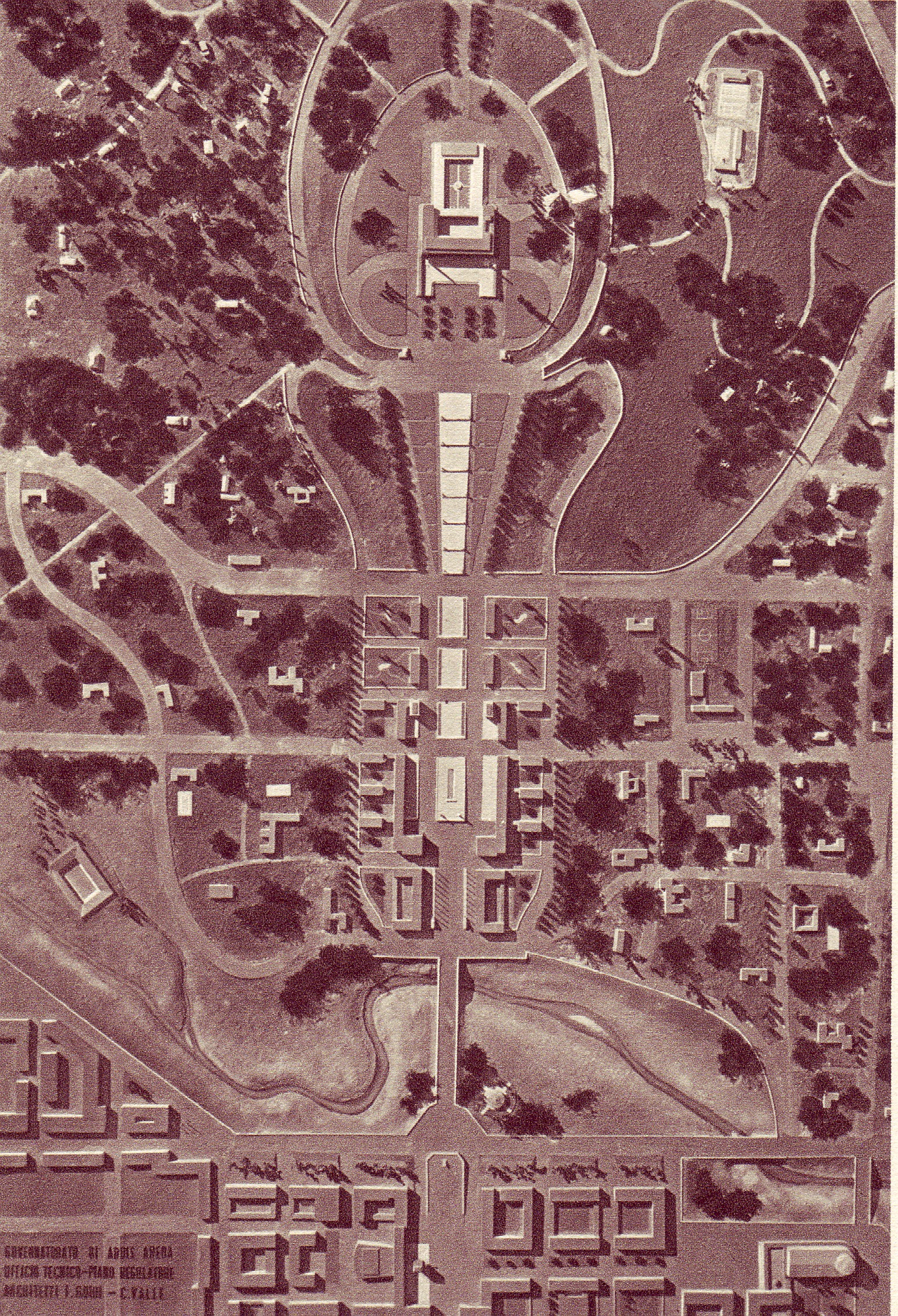
View from the top of the Addis Ababa regulatory plan

During the Italian occupation of Addis Ababa from 1936 to 1941, the city saw manifest modernization and urbanization. The Italians attempted to transfer the capital city to various notable places, such as Dessie to the north, Nekemte to the west, Ambo-Guder to the west, and Harar to the east, in order to build large fortifications and lower latitude. However, by the command of Mussolini, Addis Ababa was established as the capital of Italian East Africa, annexed with Eritrea and Somaliland.

Shortly after their occupation began, the Italian government ordered that a beautified capital city be built according to a new master plan prepared by seven architects: Marcello Piacentini, Alessandro Bianchi, Enrico Del Debbio, Giuseppe Vaccaro, Le Corbusier, Ignazio Guidi and Cesare Valle. Initially contradictory and different ideas, the plan was expected to focus on the general architectural plan for the city. The Le Corbusier guideline sketch and Guidi and Valle's proposal were set as notable plans.

=== Le Corbusier sketch ===
During an invitation of Mussolini, French-Swiss architect Le Corbusier proposed his master plan based on his 1933–1933 concept of Radiant City. He conceived the city with monumental structure traversed by grand boulevard across the city from north to south. With intention of colonial city, the plan segregated neighborhoods into the native and European sectors.

In contrast, Le Corbusier plan approach would be general guide to bring the city in new urban form. He postulated positioning military headquarter in the center of the city and traffic square in front of it, i.e this would be colonial city with an instrument of work, command center and the seat of government. The sketch also demonstrated Addis Ababa as a green city by linking every sector of green area. This plan's activity strictly bounded in zone system from north to south. The native residential quarter was located in the east side of wide boulevard whereas the Europeans was in the opposite one.

One of difference between Radiant City and his new master plan of Addis Ababa was Addis Ababa's master plan utilize public square rather than traffic square used set for public use. The public square of European area was conjoined to the main boulevard (at quadrangle of the Ethiopian National Bank, Ethiopia Hotel and National Theatre) while the native square proposed on the side of native sector. This, the square should allocated aside for public gatherings, churches, theatres, and municipal buildings. Le Corbusier did not take the topography of Addis Ababa into account since the monumental city is not flat terrain with full of water bodies, which ultimately declined by Italian authority indeed it was splendid master plan.

=== Guidi and Valle's master plan ===
In 1936, the two Italian architects, Guidi and Valle proposed master plan that emphasized regime ideology with strong monumental inclination. Unlike to Le Corbusier plan, they did not included the native sector in the design of the city. The native sector, allocated with grid iron street network, segregated from European city on the western side so European city had two parallel axis connecting Arada/Giyorgis to railway station (south end), which was 5 km and varied width from 40 to 90 meters.

The second axis designated for political centre is found east of commercial axis and starts from Sidist Kilo (now in Addis Ababa University main campus), extending southward the Menelik Palace and Meskel Square. The plan expressed in favor of Italian colonial empire by segregating native sector from European quarter and Christian to Muslim tribal sector or blocks. On other hand, it illustrated landscapism via monumental axis. Their master plan did not include the above area of St. George's Cathedral or Sidist Kilo due to cold climate and exposure to the rebel Ethiopian Patriots attacks in proximity with mountainous area.

Another reason for segregation was expropriation prohibition issued on 15 May 1935 to repair new houses and buildings as whole. In places particularly, Addis Ketema and Merkato, also shown significant changes in urban development where racial segregation existed.

== Post occupation, 1941–1974 ==
=== Sir Patrick Abercrombie plan ===
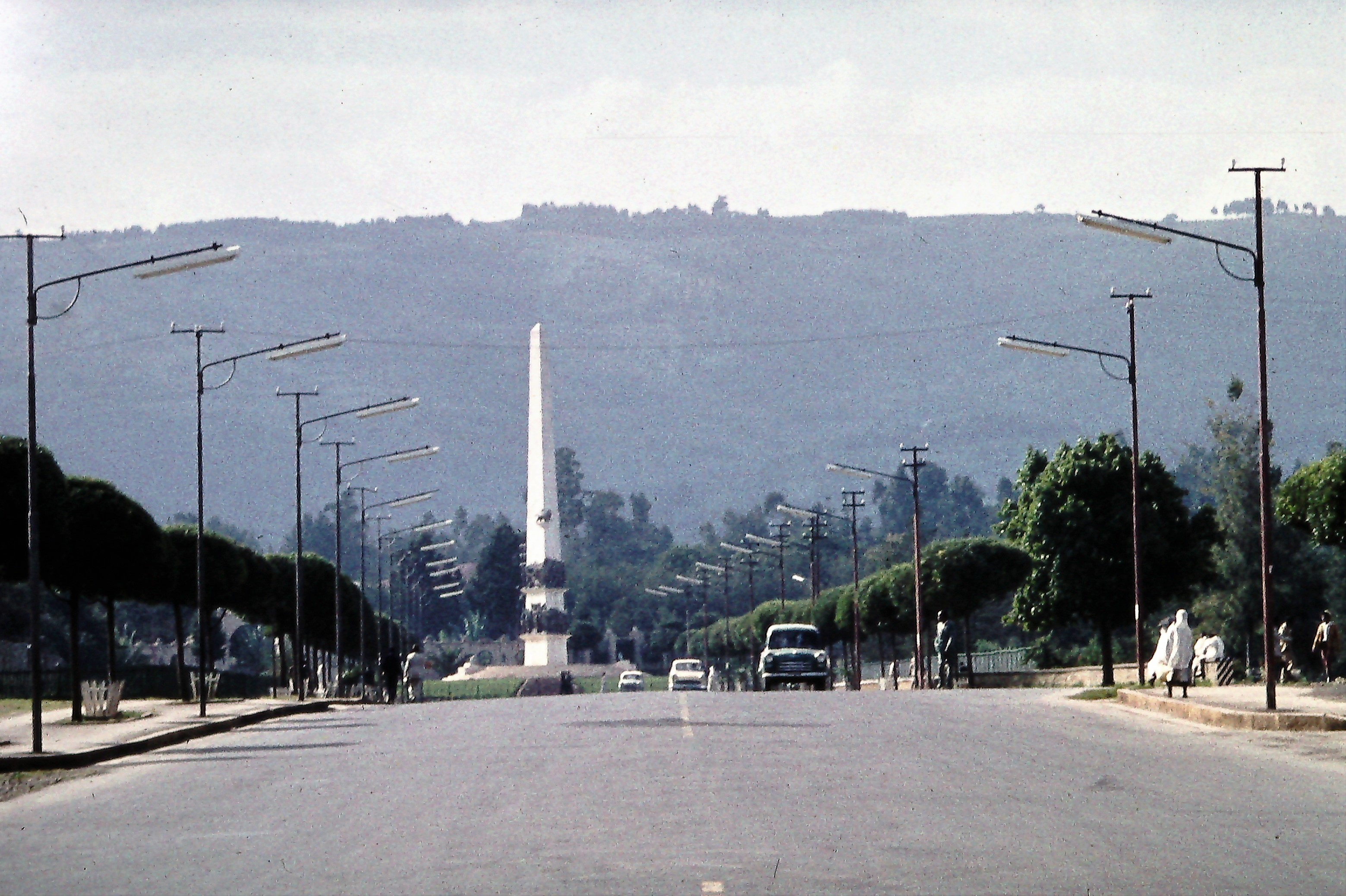
Sidist Kilo monument erected in 1955, pictured in 1960

After the occupation, Addis Ababa experienced transient economic stagnation and rapid population growth; the central area maintained urban morphology whereas the peripheral area was in urban sprawl. In 1946, Emperor Haile Selassie invited Sir Patrick Abercrombie, the famous British architect and town planner, to submit a plan that would transform Addis Ababa into being the "beautified capital of the rest of Africa". Sir Patrick prepared a plan with neighbourhood units as a planning module. He enclosed neighbourhood units with green parkways serving as an intersection to green areas. His plan, in particular, created ring roads in the city and the street network was entangled by radial or ring roads. The ring roads served to prevent the traffic pathway from the central area and kept in green belt. The outer ring born the organ nature of neighbourhood units, lying mostly around Kebena and Kotebe.

Professor Peter Hall noted that the Abercrombie plan virtually achieved unity through his decentralized city structure. The outer ring, contrary to the intended objective, did attract settlement development on its side. Abercrombie also proposed to create satellite towns on the outskirts of Addis Ababa, to be used for serving school, health centres, etc., extracted from his 1943 London traffic solution. Accordingly, Abercrombie proposed satellite settlements to towns like Keranio, Mekanissa, West of Old Air Port and Yeka Bole areas. Abercrombie also introduced monumental features and a grid iron system that had been proposed during the Italian occupation. Conversely, the Italian neighbourhood units opposed the system particularly in Addis Ketema and Merkato areas. So, the grid iron system should be require for complementing the plan.

=== Bolton Hennessy and Partners plan ===
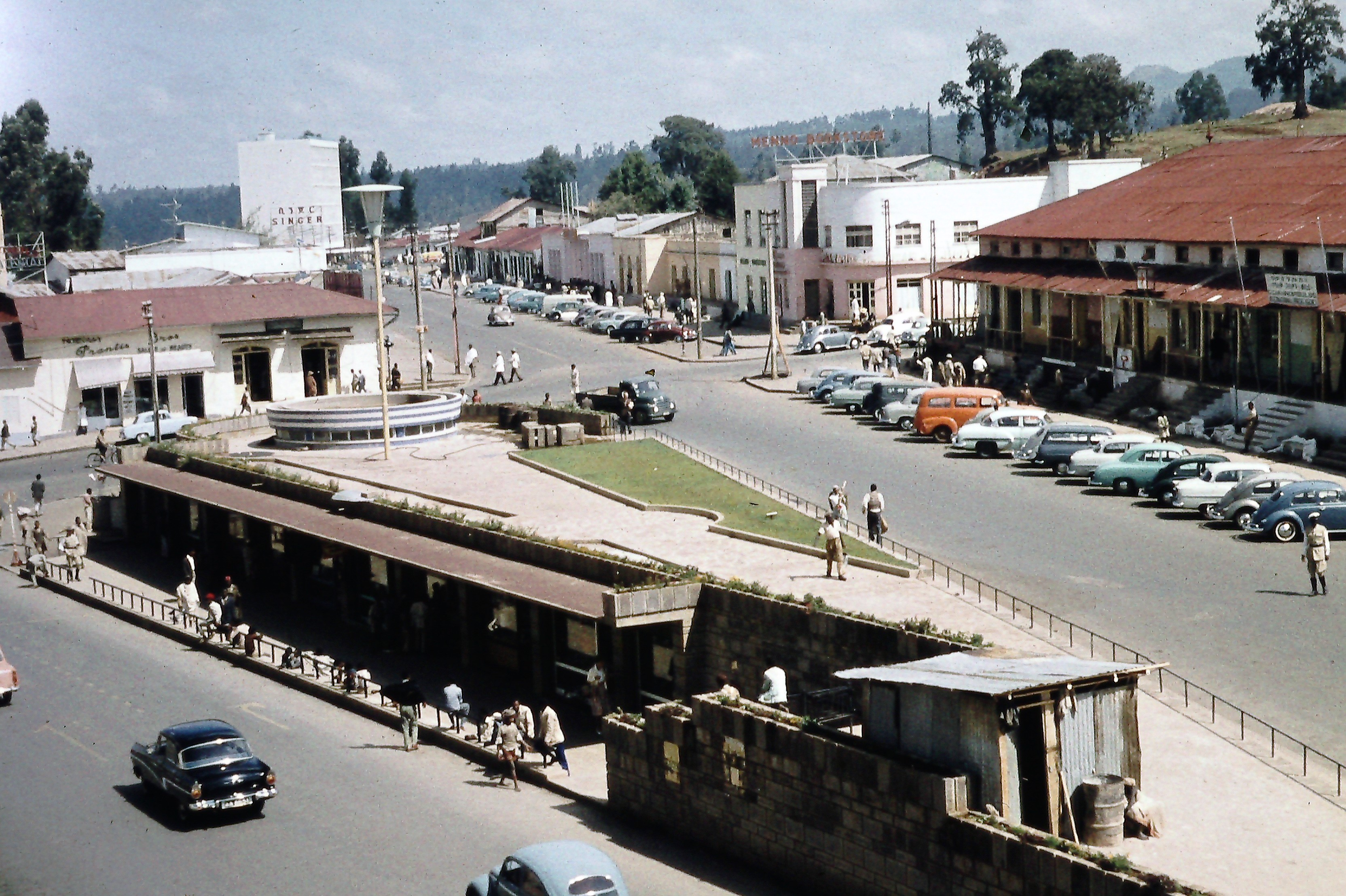
Piazza in Addis Ababa, 1960

In 1959, the British consultant team named Bolton Hennessy and Partners commissioned Abercrombie's 1954–1956 to fulfill the larger population size. Two satellite place such as Mekenissa and West of the old Air Port of Abercrombie's proposal did not incorporated to the city, while Rapi, Gefersa, Kaliti and Kotebe were proposed along with Jimma, Ambo, Mojo and Dessie respectively (the four regional highways). Their plan envisaged metropolitan development surrounded by satellite towns to enlarge Addis Ababa in size.

They were not focused on implementation tools rather than spatial planning. Neighborhood unit hindered due to lack of technical control, short timeframe and limited financial resources, though the proposed street network and satellite towns kept in implementation.

=== Luis De Marien plan ===
In 1965, the French Mission for Urban Studies and Habitat led by architect Luis De Marien embarked famous master plan dedicated to implementation rather than spatial growth and monumental axis through Addis Ababa City Hall in the northern part through the railway station at the middle extending to Gofa Mazoria in the southern part of the city. The difference between Marien's plan to the Italian was he used single monumental axis whereas the Italian used the double one.

By connecting the end point of Addis Ababa City Hall and the railway station with extension to south, the city impressed with Champ Elysees in Paris extended from Louvre area to La Defense district of the city. He proposed north-south of the plan used by the Italians; the political administrative area that extended Arat Kilo Palace to Sidist Kilo given considerate necessity for city structure. In addition, linear development of industrial zone was unique idea to create industrialized venue in the south edge, especially from Gotera area to Kaliti without interruption of freight terminal line that spread to Akaki. Marien's plan also set the stage of construction booming of buildings with modernized structure and less cost.

== The Derg era, 1974–1991 ==
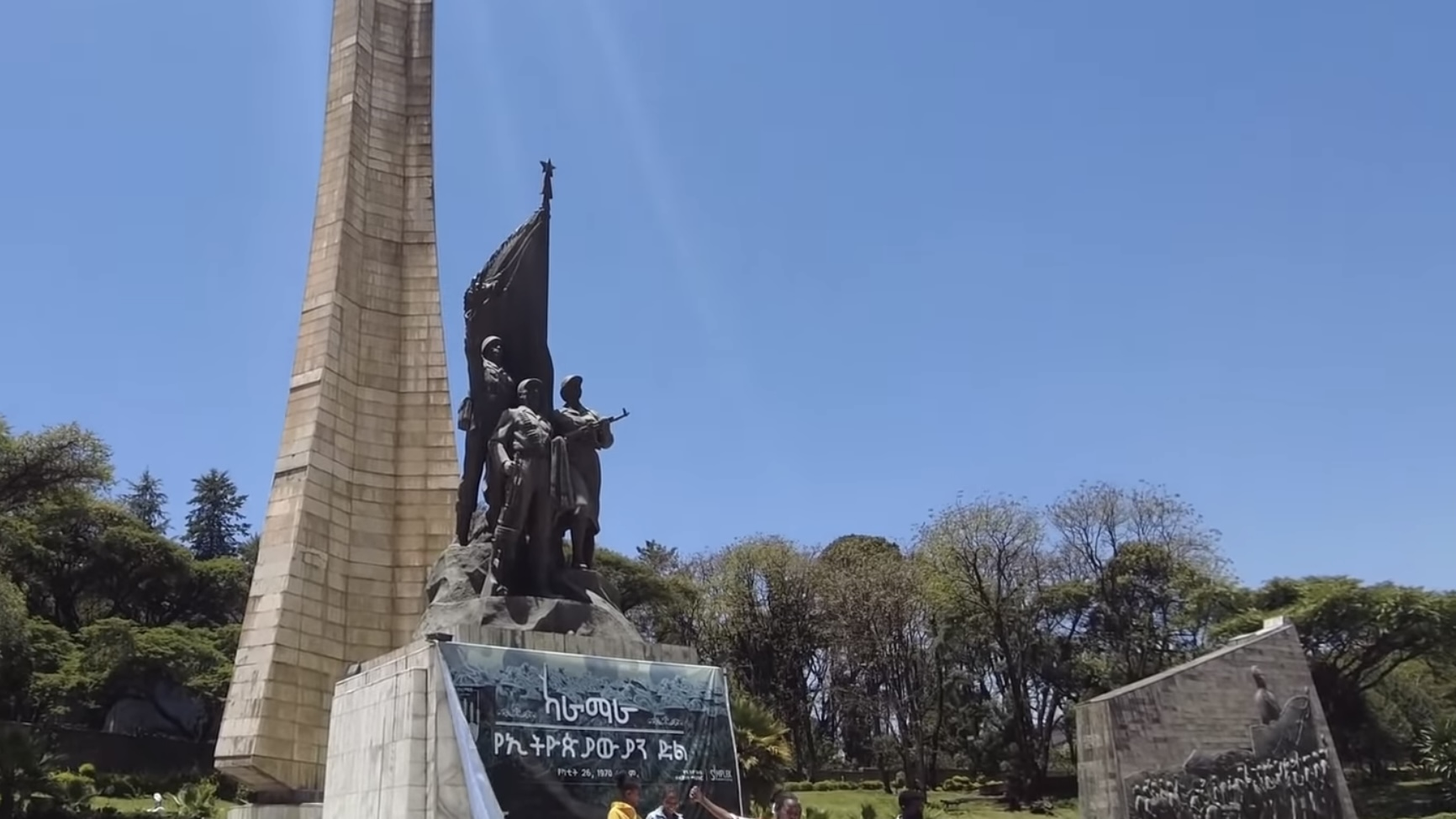
Tiglachin Monument built by the Derg government

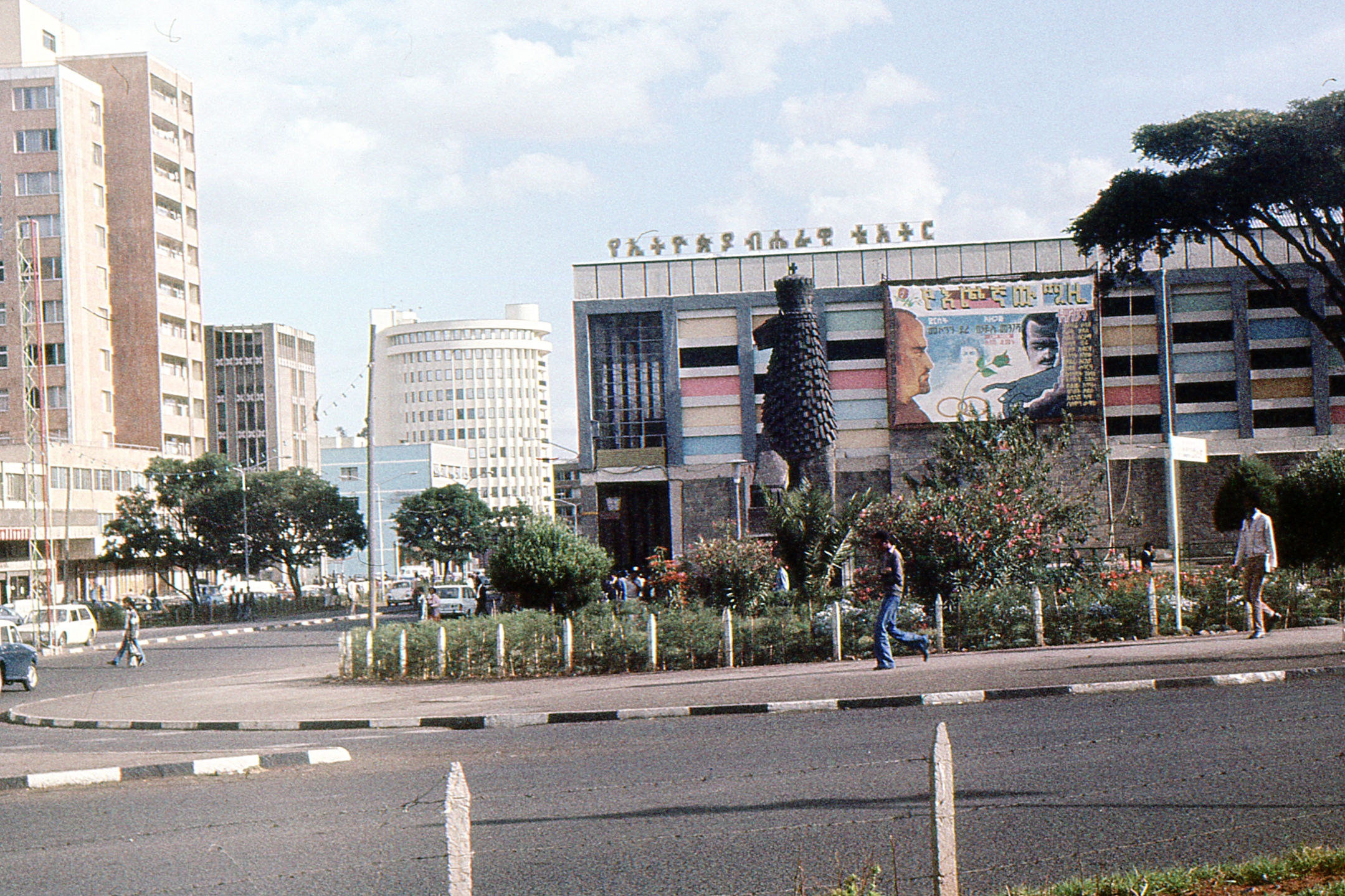
1983 photo of Arat Kilo street, the Ethiopian National Theatre is from background

During the Derg era, the city saw nationalization of urban lands and extra house that prevented to build private investment sector, slowing the growth rate. However, the government dictate construction of facilities for urban services for public house except few private investment for some houses. The government began offering land free of charge to governmental employees that did not possess any houses previously.

Political unrest, insecurity of urban life due to political conflicts and nationalization forge huge instability to build house for rental and immigration control over cities or towns through registration of people's movements. This authoritarian steps led Addis Ababa to drop from 5% to 3.4% percent annually, about half of the previous Haile Selassie government growth rate.

=== C.K. Polonyi plan ===
The Hungarian planner C.K. Polonyi first developed master plan in the Derg era with cooperation of Ministry of Urban Development and Housing, comprising two proposals: the first was linkage of Addis Ababa with surrounding towns and cities and the second was the development of residential layout for self-help housing projects. Polonyi also reworked in designation of Meskel Square for the Derg military parade performances where immediately implemented and the square renamed to Abiyot Square shortly afterward. In addition, the square served central point for political axis and linking Arada railway station axis.

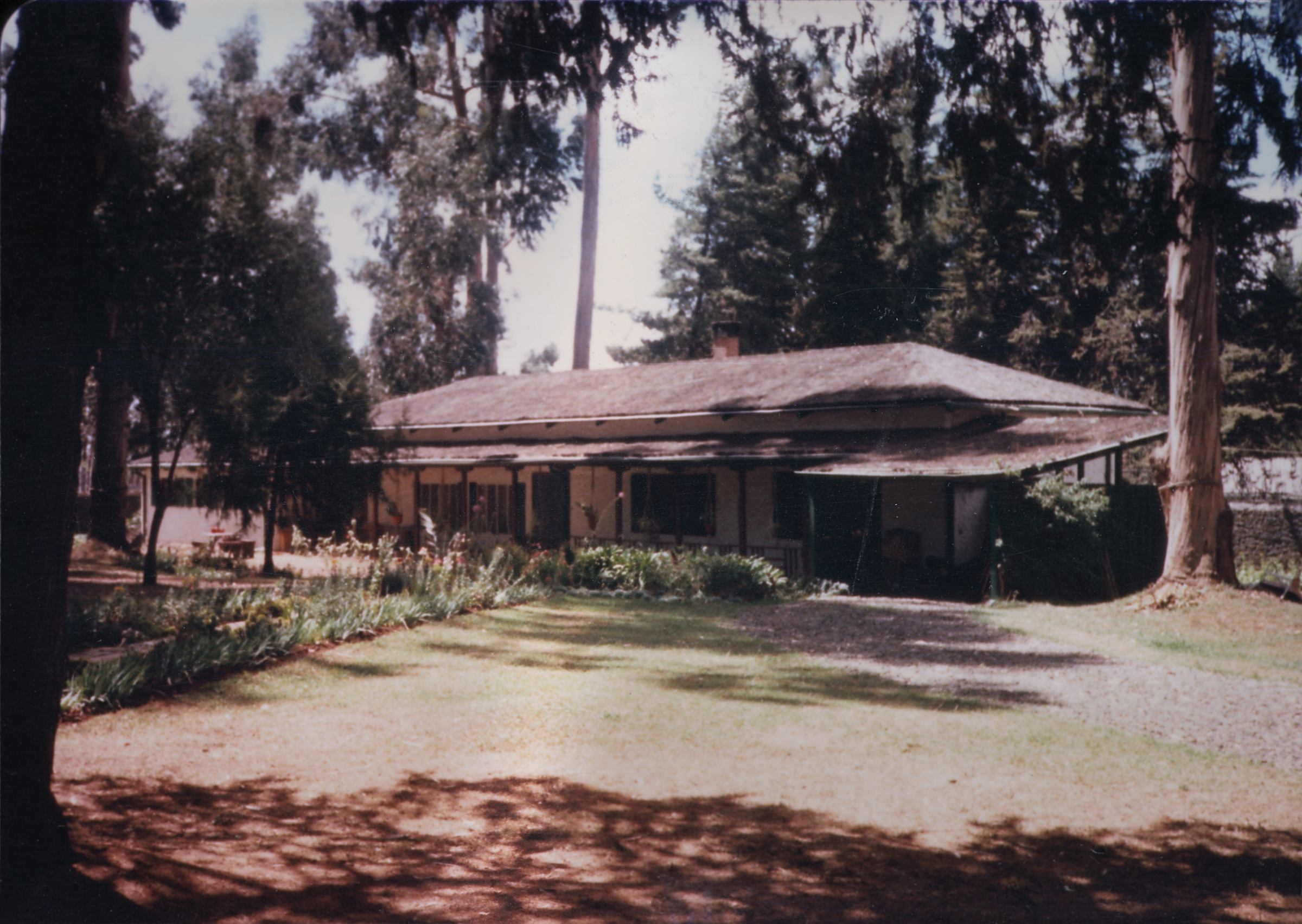
Multi-unit residential building, pictured in 1985

Polonyi secondly proposed to develop Addis Ababa as megacity; to connect through Adama, thus forging agricultural conglomeration in southeast. Town like Debre Zeit, a military base, supposed to facilitate the communication for the poles. Lack of support from the government and dwindling urban growth led the plan on failure to implement.

=== 1986 Italo-Ethiopian master plan ===
In 1986, master plan was drafted with cooperation of 45 Ethiopian professionals and 75 Italian experts, where 237 sectorial reports documented as references. The objective of the plan was to develop balanced urban system and an integration with the surrounding areas to form metropolitan level area. The plan also intended to address issue related to water service in urban area. The plan envisioned to extend its boundary into east and southern parts; Akaki in 25 km from Addis Ababa incorporated for the purpose of industrial and freight terminal services and Kaliti designated for commercial and other public service development. It was ultimately delayed to eight years and approved in 1994; the postponement caused series bugs such as urban sprawl, fragmented public areas and the unplanned development affected the structure of the city. The plan also used for residential development from Gerji to Kotebe in the east, Lafto and Mekenissa in the south-west, and Keranio in the western part. In spreading new housing areas3 such as CMC and Meri, the plan also included accessing road.

== Federal Democratic Republic, 1991–2003 ==
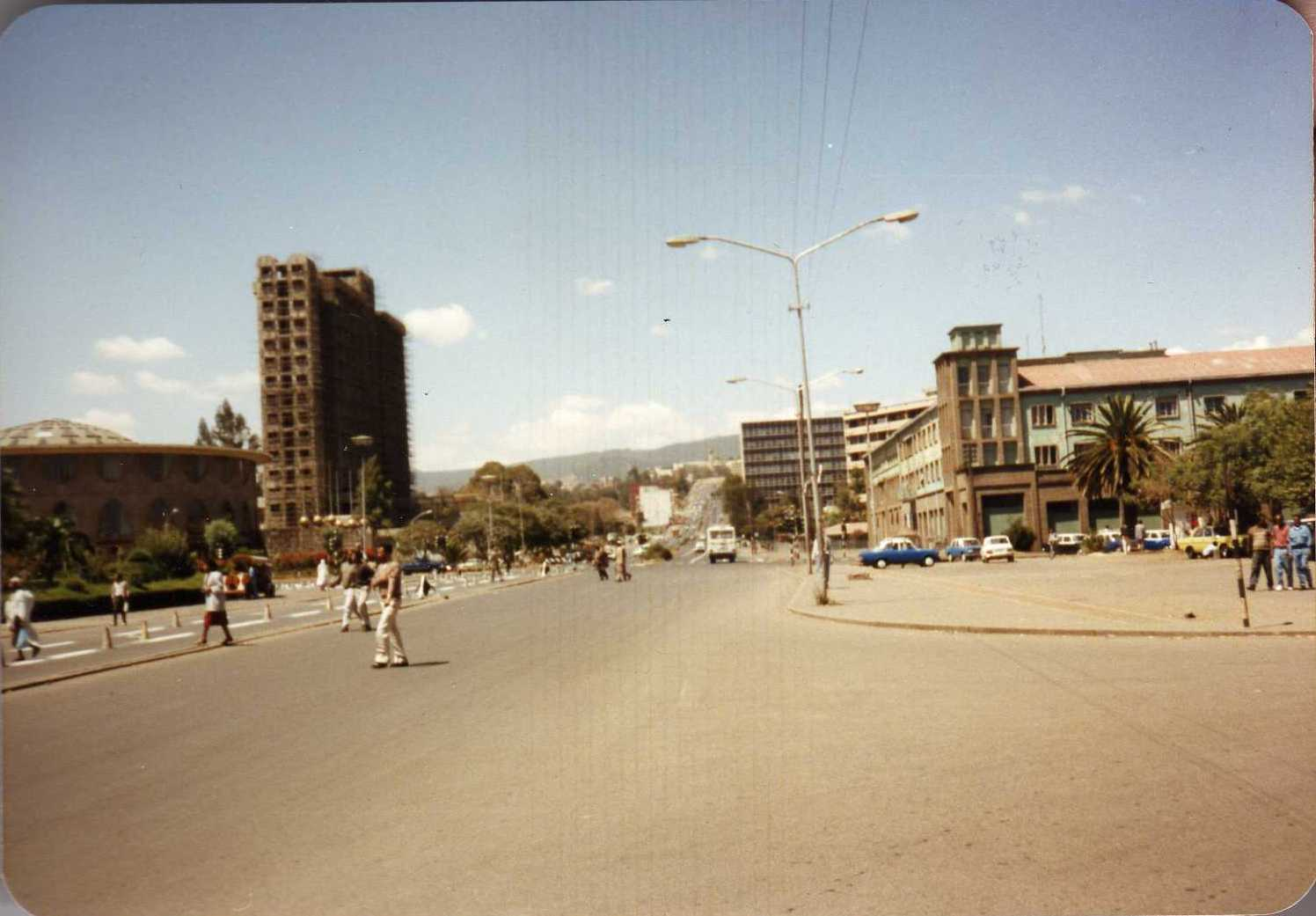
Addis Ababa street in 1993

Following the dissolution of the Derg in 1991 and the new transitional government under EPRDF, urban growth was very slow as a result of decentralized policy in the first three years. Housing allotment was continued and later replaced real estate housing into transferring individual ownership.

=== Revised 2003 master plan ===
At the end of 1998, the Addis Ababa City Administration launched new project named Office for Revision of Addis Ababa Master Plan (ORAAMP) with new master plan called "Revisited Addis Ababa Master Plan" covering from 1999 to 2003. This plan was developed to respond the newly formed market economy and to improve the political system of the government.
