= Adwa Zero KM Project =

Megaproject in Addis Ababa, Ethiopia from 2019 to 2024

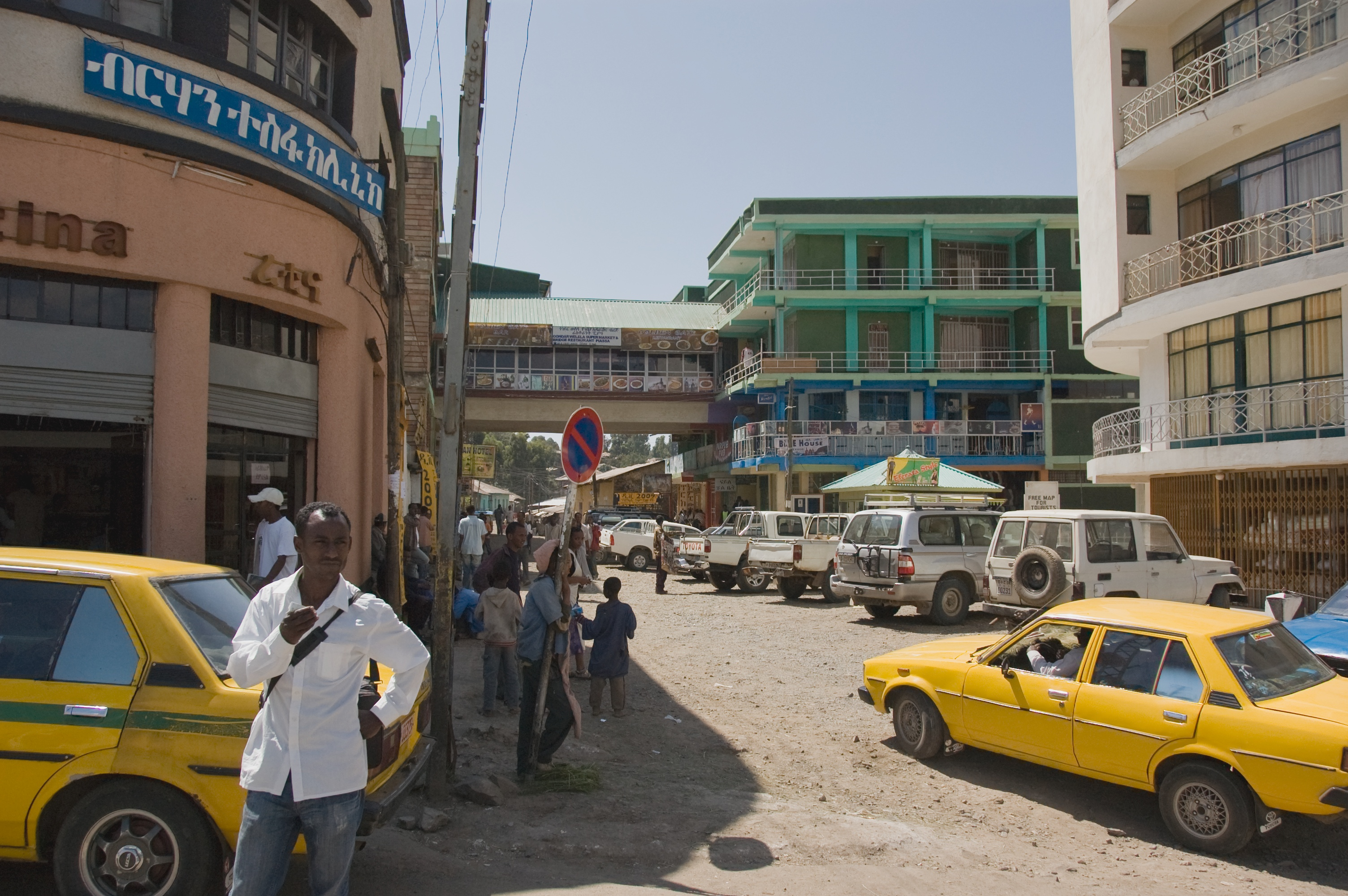
- Merkato, the marketplace in Piassa before the infrastructural construction
- Other name: Adwa 00KM Project
- Location: Piassa, Arada district, Addis Ababa, Ethiopia
- Status: Complete
- Groundbreaking: 10 February 2024
- Constructed: 2019

Companies
- Architect: Miressa Likessa
- Contractor: Jiangsu

Technical details
- Size: 3.3 hectares

Adwa Zero KM Project, also called Adwa 00KM Project, was a megaproject in Addis Ababa, Ethiopia, started in 2019. Named after the Ethiopian victory at the battle of Adwa in 1896, the project hosts a multipurpose facility, including a meeting hall, amphitheater, libraries, and youth centers. The Chinese firm Jiangsu was awarded a bid for construction with 45,000 square kilometers of land in the place of Piassa. On 10 February 2024, the project was completed.

== History ==
Adwa Zero KM Project was named after the commemoration of the Ethiopian victory at Battle of Adwa in 1896. Commenced in 2019, it was due completion within two years, but postponed due to COVID-19 pandemic. According to the Mayor of Addis Ababa Adanech Abebe, the project was expected to be completed in mid-February 2024, coinciding the 37 scheduled meeting of the African Union in Addis Ababa. The construction was awarded to Chinese contractor Jiangsu for construction of a 45,000 square meter plot in Piassa, which in turn subcontracted out to another Chinese firm contractor Hobart.

The project planned to build a meeting hall for the Addis Ababa City Council and other venues like Adwa Memorial Museum, an amphitheater, libraries and youth centers. On 1 March 2022, the project has reached 75% completion according to the Addis Ababa City Administration. It includes structural works. According to the Mega Projects Office Head at the City Administration Engineer Miressa Likessa, the area landed on 3.3 hectare in Addis Ababa with 4.6 billion birr cost to build modern parking that have capacity of accommodating more than 1,000 cars at a time. In February 2024, the project inaugurated Adwa 00KM Museum which is located in the intersection between Statue of Menelik II and St. George's Cathedral.
