= Adwa 00KM Museum =

Museum in Addis Ababa, Ethiopia

- አድዋ 00 ሙዚየም
- Established: 11 February 2024
- Location: Piasa, Arada district, Addis Ababa, Ethiopia
- Coordinates: 9.0332°N 38.7533°E
- Type: Historical
- Visitors: 31,750 (15 March – 15 April 2024)
- Architect: Eskender Wubetu
- Website: adwamuseum.com

The Adwa 00KM Museum (Amharic: አድዋ 00 ሙዚየም) is a public historical museum located in Piasa, Arada district, Addis Ababa, Ethiopia. Inaugurated on 11 February 2024, the museum is dedicated to the Battle of Adwa, the battle of the First Italo-Ethiopian War where Italian forces were defeated by the Ethiopian Army in 1896. Part of Adwa Zero KM Project, the museum lies on 1.5 hectares of land.

The museum features peculiar architecture design involving an integrated bridge connecting the building to the Municipality of Addis Ababa Mayor’s Office, entrance with four cardinal gates associated with war motifs, and artistic design of the interior walls. The museum has eleven blocks and five floors.

== Background ==
The Adwa 00KM Museum project conceptualized during Takele Uma Banti's mayor ship. He ensures the museum should fit with the height of Statue of Menelik II. As part of Adwa Zero KM Project, the museum was inaugurated on 11 February 2024 and opened for public on 16 March. During the event, Mayor of Addis Ababa Adanech Abebe described it as "timeless edifice" by stating "Adwa Victory Memorial – with its eleven blocks and five floors- is built with architectural excellence in a way that matches the fruit of the patriot’s victory". Prime Minister Abiy Ahmed said to the project in the occasion of the event "Those of you who doubt… those of you who doubt our stand, who our speech, pause and pay attention. Do not let strangers take away your mind. we are not one who could not be stopped by strangers for we are the children of our fathers".

Adwa Museum is located in the border between Menelik's Monument and St. George's Cathedral in Piasa, Arada district. The museum is linked by a bridge, which connect it to the Municipality of Addis Ababa Mayor’s Office. The museum was built to honor the Ethiopian Victory of Adwa in 1896. Eskender Wubetu, the principal architect states that the museum was built in demand of client's objectives. The museum lies in 1.5 hectares of land, having eleven blocks and five floors.

The museum has four entrances leading to various areas of buildings with specialized features: Heroes of the South, Heroes of the North, Heroes of the East, and Heroes of the West are shown at entrance. According to Eskinder, the cardinal directions represents the nature of war from "all sides of directions". The main challenge during the construction was incorporating the Ethiopian symbols into design of a building. He also said that the Axum monument and Lalibela architecture are incorporated in corridor supports and staircase. The statue of Emperor Menelik II and Empress Taytu sit in flanking near the plaza where water fountain is located.
