= Gullele =

District of Addis Ababa, Ethiopia

Gullele ጉለሌ ክፍለ ከተማ
- Sub-city
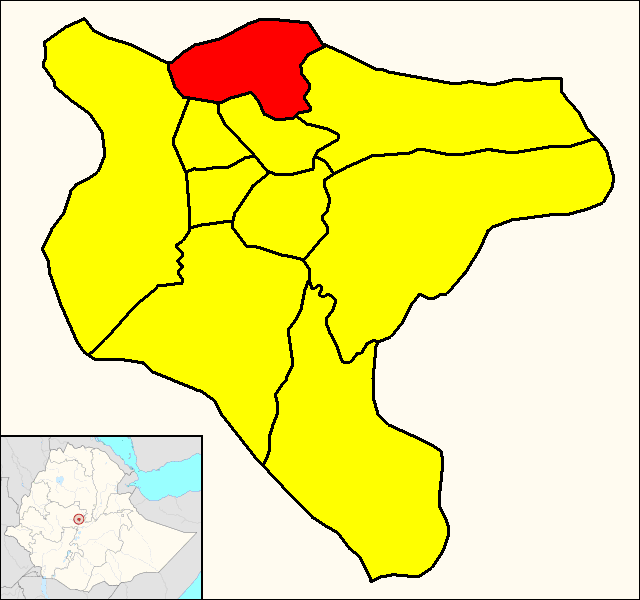
- Gullele (red) within Addis Ababa

- Location in Ethiopia
- Coordinates: 9°3′46.8″N 38°44′36.96″E
- Country: Ethiopia
- City: Addis Ababa

Area
  - Total: 30.18 km^{2} (11.65 sq mi)

Population (2011)
  - Total: 248,865
  - Density: 9,438.9/km^{2} (24,447/sq mi)
- Time zone: UTC+3 (East Africa Time)
- Area code: (+251) 11

Gullele (Amharic: ጉለሌ ክፍለ ከተማ), also spelled Gulele, is a district (sub-city) of Addis Ababa, Ethiopia. As of 2011 its population was of 248,865.

== Geography ==
The district is located in northern suburb of the city, near the Mount Entoto and Entoto Natural Park. It borders with the districts of Kolfe Keranio, Addis Ketema, Arada and Yeka.

== List of places ==
- Gullele Bota

== See also ==
- Yekatit 12 Square
