= Lideta =

District of Addis Ababa, Ethiopia

Lideta ልደታ ክፍለ ከተማ
- Sub-city
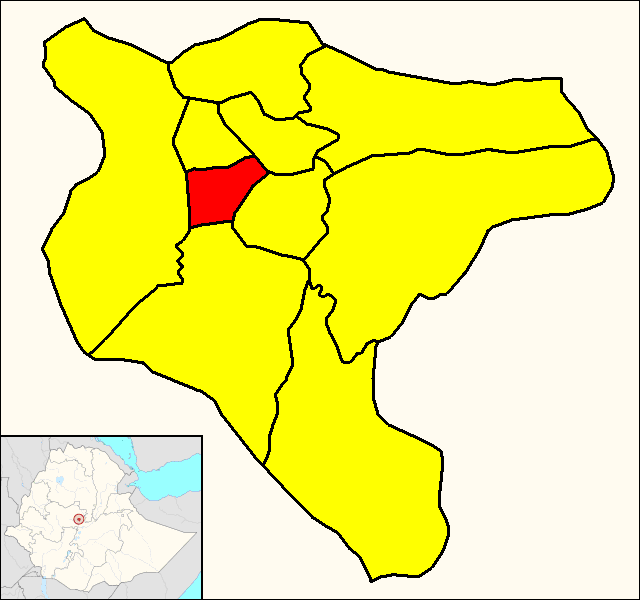
- Lideta (red) within Addis Ababa

- Location in Ethiopia
- Coordinates: 9°0′41.76″N 38°44′3.84″E
- Country: Ethiopia
- City: Addis Ababa

Area
  - Total: 9.18 km^{2} (3.54 sq mi)

Population (2011)
  - Total: 214,769
  - Density: 23,000/km^{2} (60,000/sq mi)
- Time zone: UTC+3 (East Africa Time)
- Area code: (+251) 11

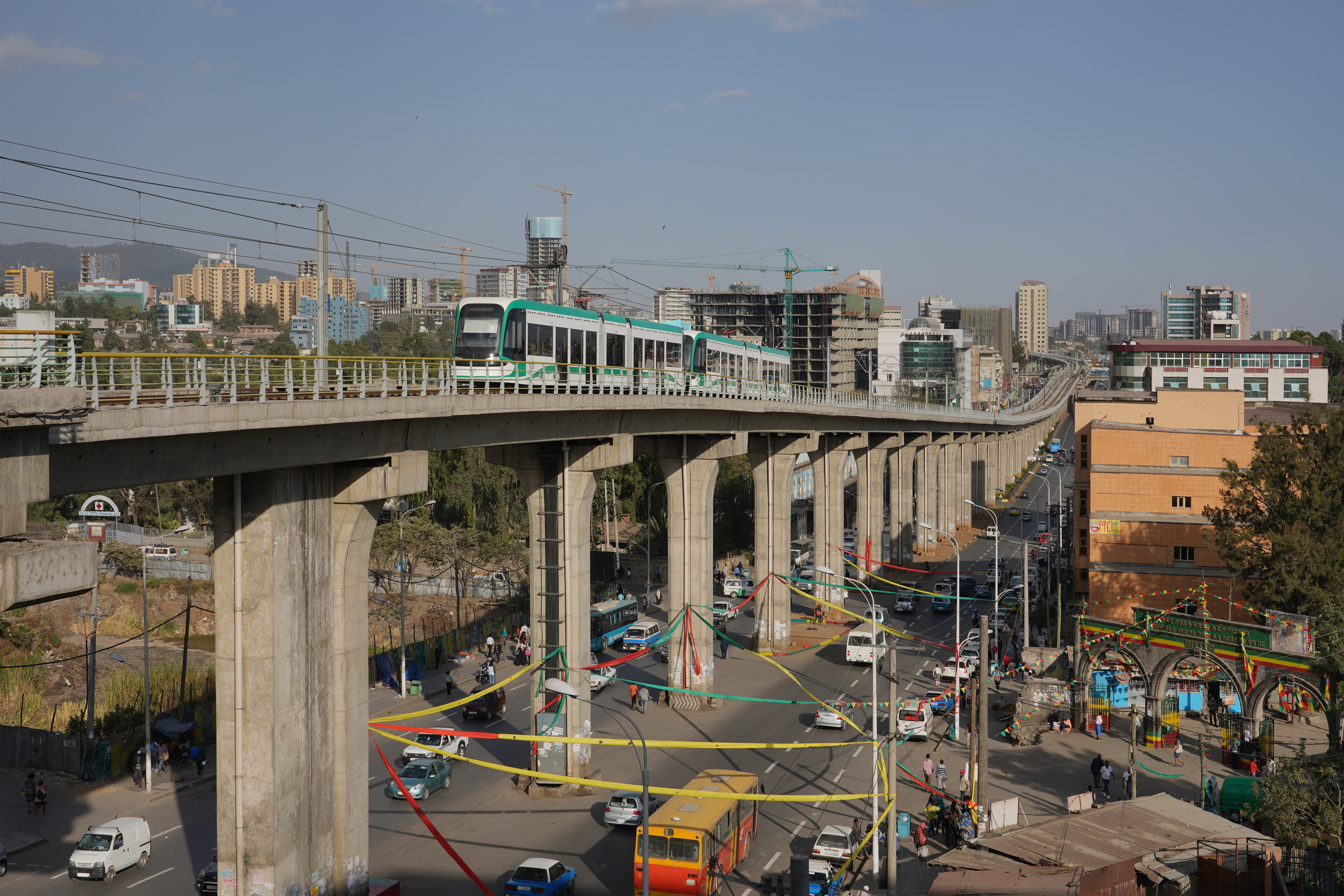
Central Lideta. The ortodox church of its namesake is visible in the corner

Lideta (Amharic: ልደታ ክፍለ ከተማ) is a district (sub-city) of Addis Ababa, Ethiopia. As of 2011 its population was of 214,769.

== Geography ==
The district is located in the central-western area of the city, nearby the centre. It borders with the districts of Addis Ketema, Arada, Kirkos, Nifas Silk-Lafto and Kolfe Keranio.

== List of places ==
- Little Texas

=== Admin Level: 11 ===
- Abnet Square
- Agusta
- Berbere Berenda
- Ched Tera
- Coca
- Darmar
- Geja Seffer
- Golla Mikael
- Goma Kuteba
- Jos Hansen
- Ketena Hulet
- Mechare Meda
- Microlink Project
- Mobil
- Molla Maru
- Sengatera
- Tekle Haymanot
- Tor Hayloch

== See also ==
- Lideta Army Airport
- Lideta Catholic Cathedral School
- Lideta Nyala
- National Archives and Library of Ethiopia
