= Akaki Stormwater Channel =

Stormwater channel associated with the Akaki River basin in Addis Ababa, Ethiopia

The Akaki Stormwater Channel is a drainage infrastructure associated with the Akaki River basin in Addis Ababa, Ethiopia.

The channel system forms part of the broader stormwater drainage network serving the Akaki Kality area of Addis Ababa.

== Background ==
The Akaki River is the largest river system in Addis Ababa and includes the Little Akaki and Great Akaki rivers.

Rapid urbanisation and inadequate drainage infrastructure have contributed to flooding problems in the Akaki Kality sub-city.

== Drainage Issues ==
Research conducted by Addis Ababa University reported that drainage channels in Akaki Kality are affected by design deficiencies, poor construction practices, and improper waste disposal.

The study also noted that stormwater overflows can flood roads, obstruct traffic, and contribute to transportation hazards within the sub-city.

== Flood Risk ==
Flood-mapping research on the Great Akaki River identified significant flood exposure in parts of Akaki Kality and recommended flood-protection infrastructure and risk-management measures.
