= Medhane Alem Cathedral, Addis Ababa =

Cathedral in Addis Ababa, Ethiopia

Medhane Alem Cathedral
- መድኃኔዓለም ካቴድራል
- Medhane Alem in 2009
- Medhane Alem Cathedral
- 8°59′45″N 38°47′24″E
- Location: Bole, Addis Ababa
- Country: Ethiopia
- Denomination: Ethiopian Orthodox Tewahedo Church

Architecture
- Architect: Zenaye Workeneh
- Years built: 1924
- Completed: 1931

Specifications
- Materials: Stone, wood and marble

Medhane Alem Cathedral (Amharic: መድኃኔዓለም ካቴድራል), whose name means "Saviour of the World", is an Ethiopian Orthodox Tewahedo cathedral in Bole Medhanealem, Addis Ababa, Ethiopia. Completed in 1931, it is the second largest cathedral in Africa and the largest in Ethiopia.

The church, along with Gennet Mariam, is decorated with external columns type of modern architecture of Ethiopia.

== Background ==
Bole Medhane Alem Cathedral was constructed in 1924 and completed in 1931 under the guidance of Emperor Haile Selassie. The cathedral was designed by an Indian architect named Zenaye Workeneh, blending Ethiopian architecture with European, and becoming the largest cathedral in Ethiopia and the second largest cathedral in Africa.

Bole Medhane Alem Cathedral attracted thousands of visitors per year. It is an important place for religious and cultural center as well as the headquarters of the Ethiopian Orthodox Tewahedo Church.

The church building was built by stone, wood and marble, and the ulterior surface was made of granite, while the interior contains stained glass windows, intricate carvings, and ornate decorations. The church building has seats accommodating over 5,000 people at a time.

== Gallery ==
Medhane Alem Cathedral, Addis Ababa

Medhane Alem Cathedral, Addis Ababa

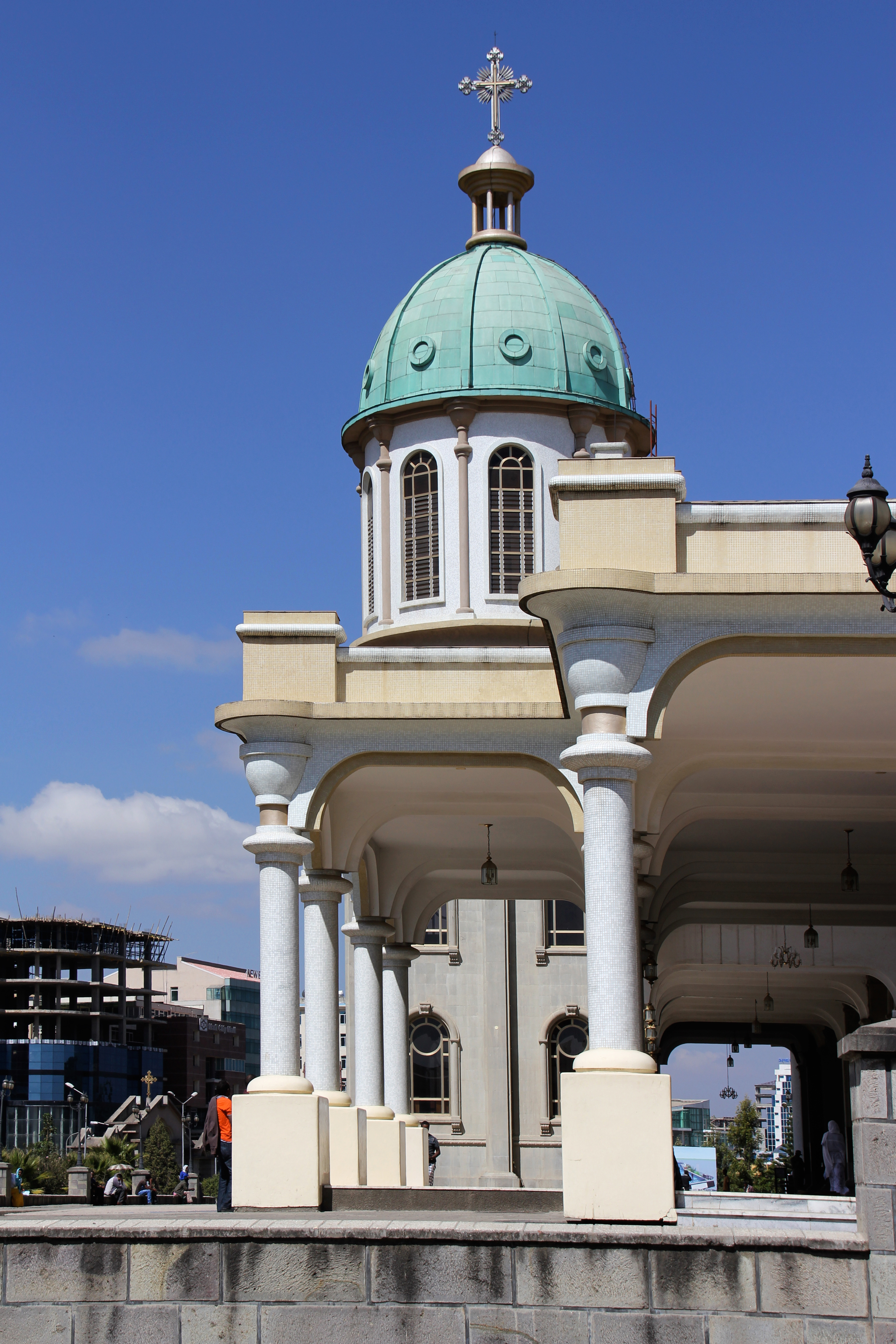
Medhane Alem Cathedral, Side view, Addis Abeba

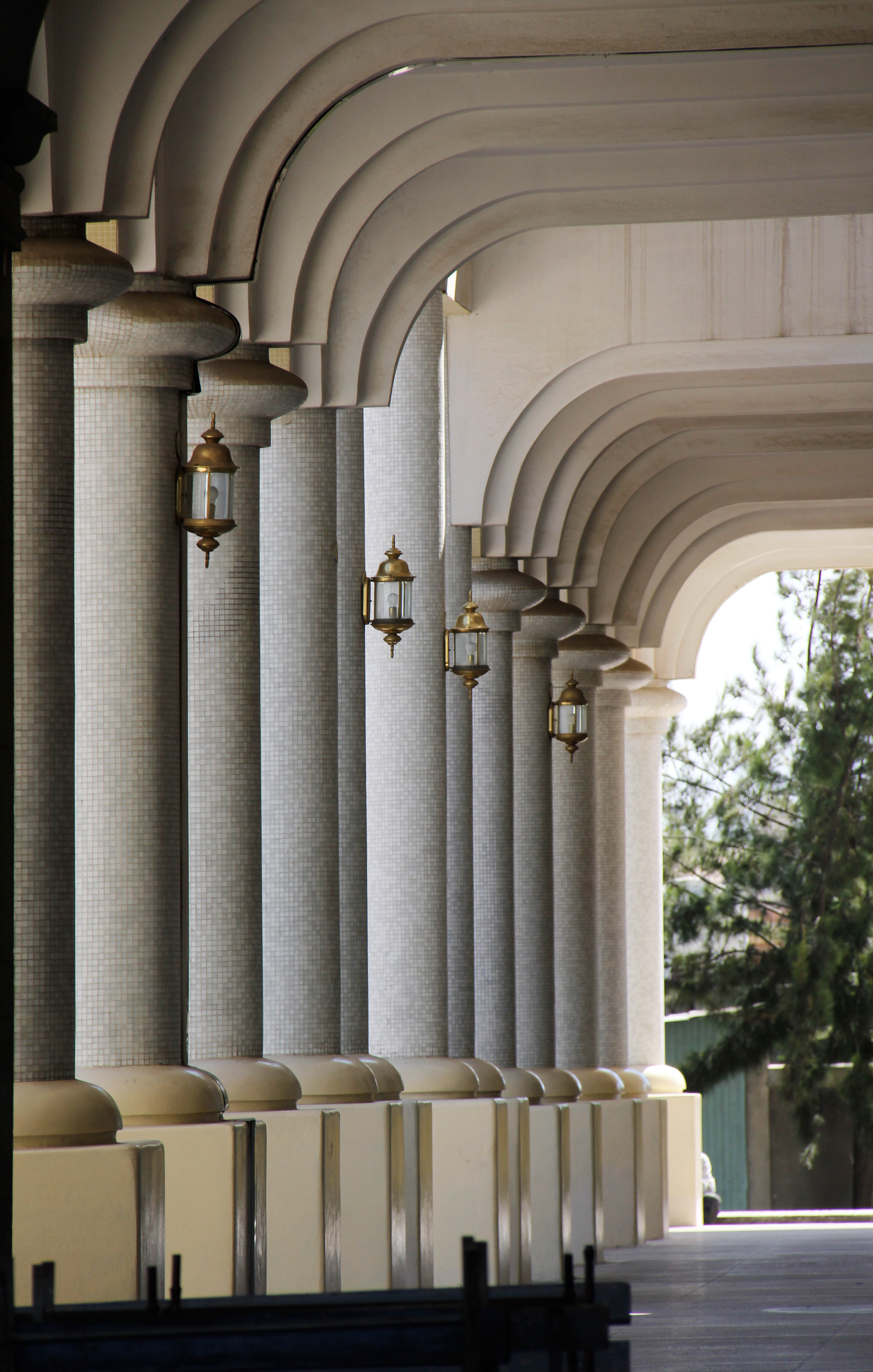
Medhane Alem Cathedral, Columns

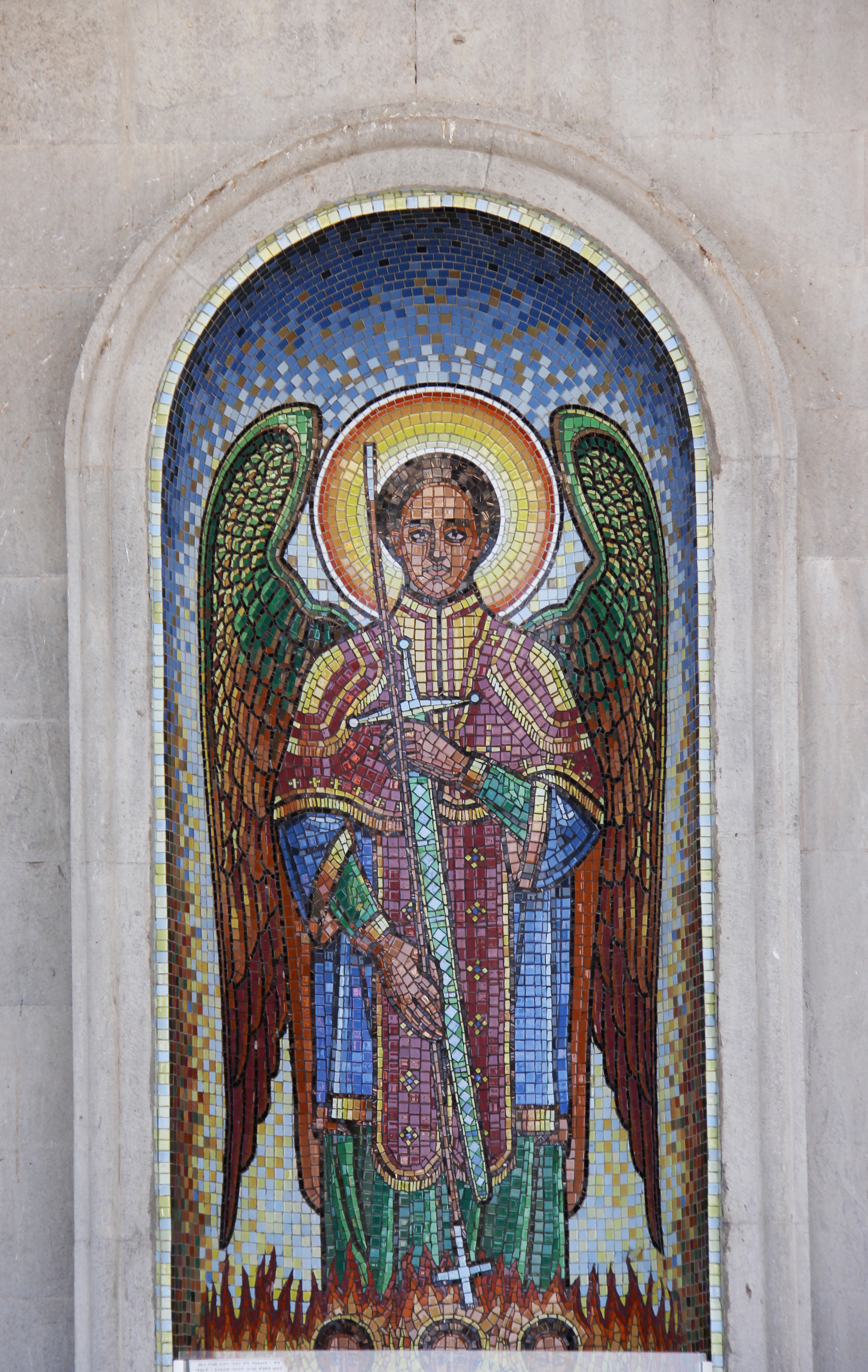
Medhane Alem Cathedral, detail

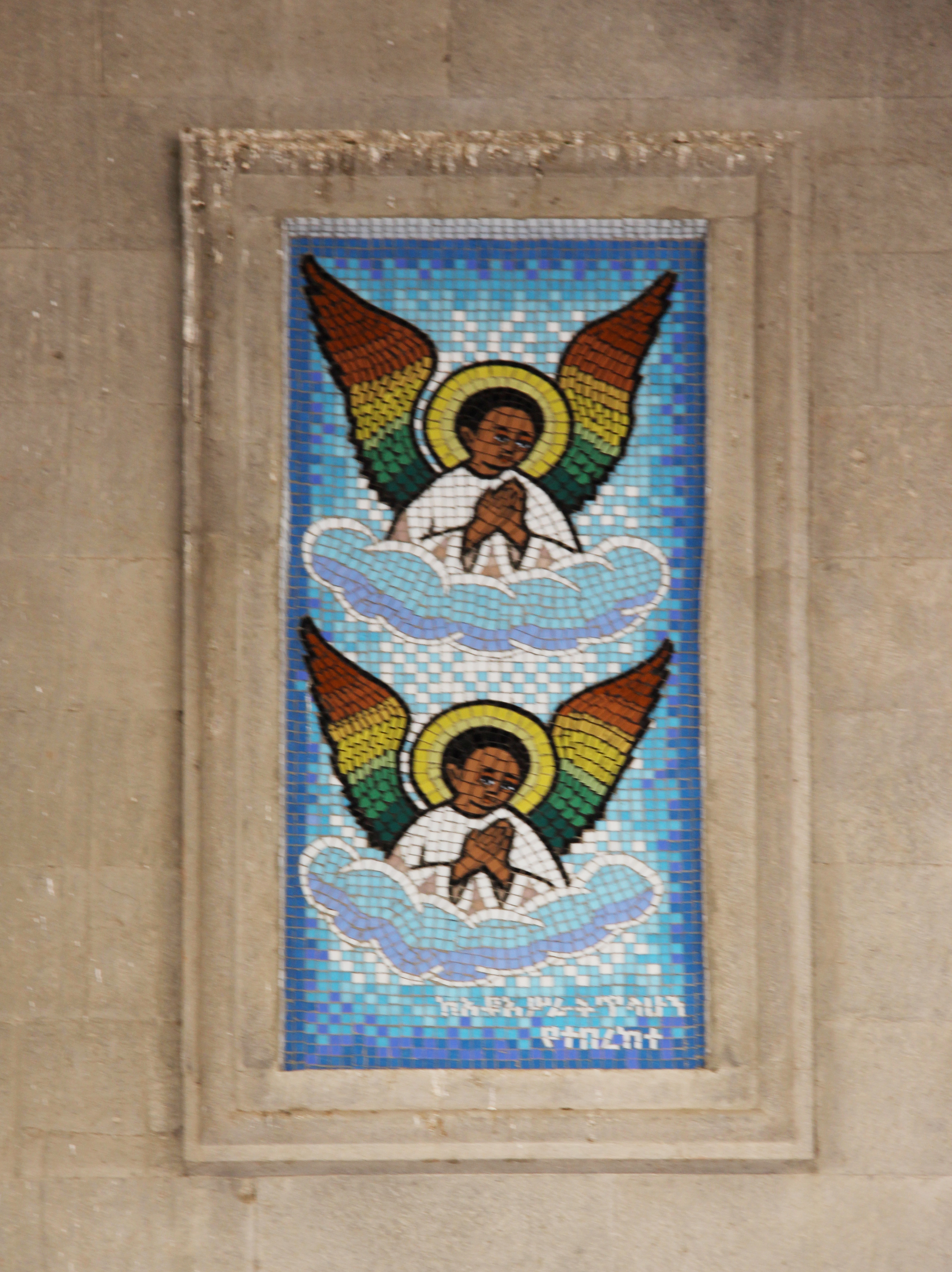
Medhane Alem Cathedral, detail

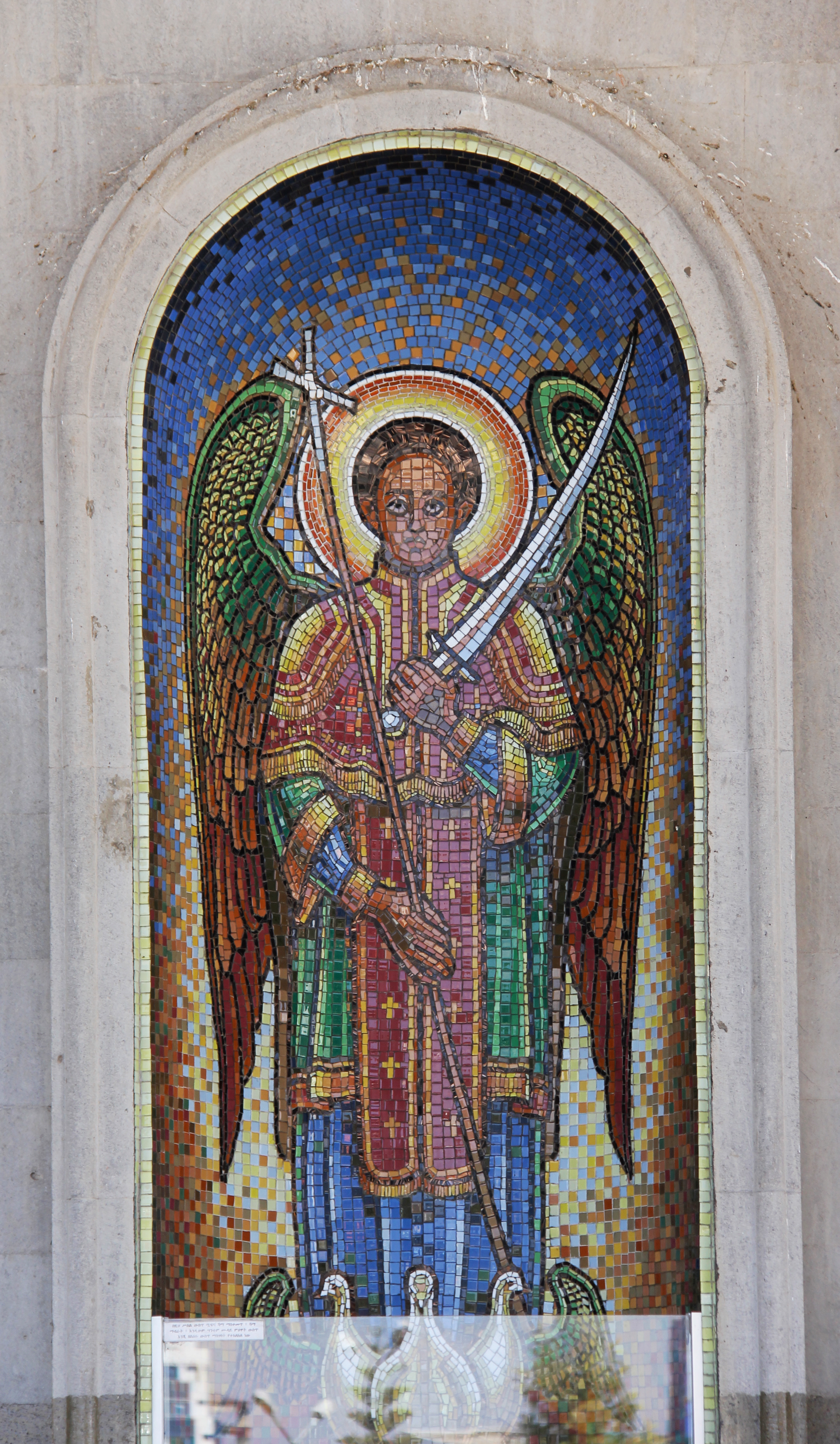
Medhane Alem Cathedral, detail

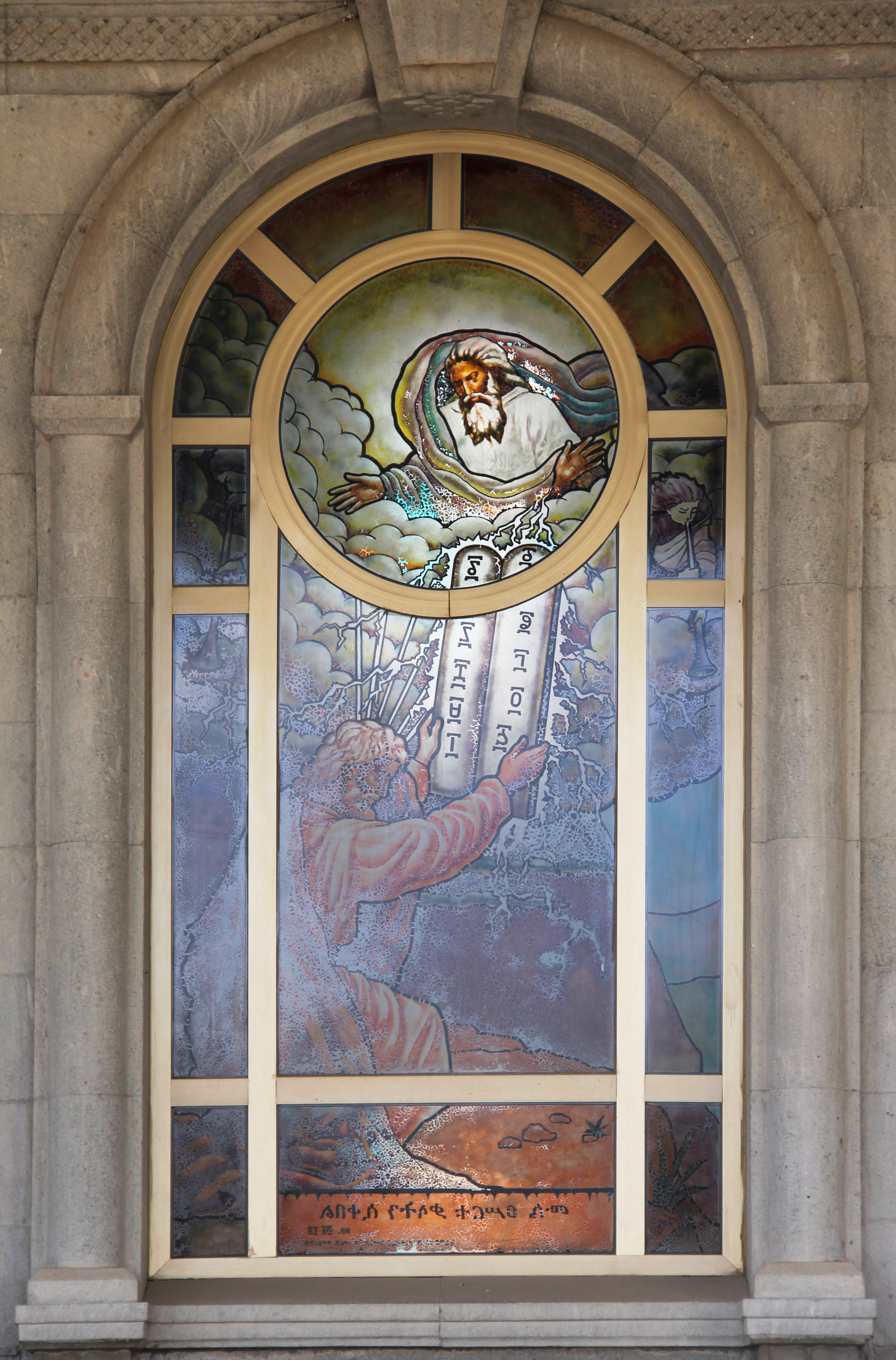
Medhane Alem Cathedral, detail
