= Taitu Hotel =

Hotel in Addis Ababa, Ethiopia

Itegue Taitu Hotel
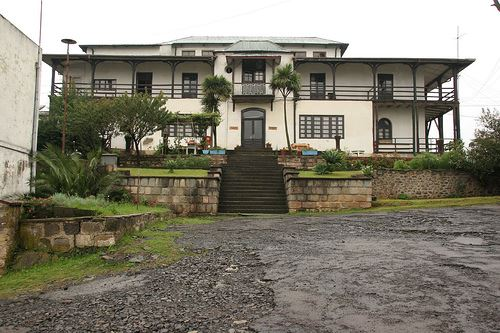
- Historic facade of Itegue Taitu Hotel

General information
- Location: Dejazemach Jote Street, Piazza, Addis Ababa, Ethiopia
- Coordinates: 9.030649°N 38.7542562°E
- Opening: 1905

Other information
- Parking: Free parking for over 50 vehicles

Website
- taituhotel.com

Itegue Taitu Hotel (Amharic: እቴጌ ጣይቱ ሆቴል) is the oldest hotel in Ethiopia, located in the historic Piazza district of Addis Ababa. Built in 1905, it was founded by Empress Taitu Betul, wife of Emperor Menelik II, to accommodate foreign guests with a place to rest and dine.

== History ==
The hotel was part of Menelik II’s modernization efforts following Ethiopia’s victory at the Battle of Adwa in 1896, the Hotel was located inside the Palace complex that became the nucleus of Modern Addis Ababa city, the original hotel was bigger and was reduced in size during the Italian prompt invasion, the Italian commanders used the Western wing as their own living quarters, after liberation Emperor Haile Selassie built a new palace next to the First Hilton Hotel in Africa and the Taitu hotel was never restored to its original size or status.

=== Status ===
The original hotel was a hub for diplomats, journalists, and travelers, including British author Evelyn Waugh, who fictionalized it as the "Liberty Hotel" in his satirical novel Scoop.

==== 2015 Fire ====
On 11 January 2015, a major fire broke out which caused significant damage on the main hotel properties.

==== Baro West Wing ====
The western wing of the hotel was built in the early 1900s to commemorate the Anglo-Ethiopian treaty that joined the Baro Salient to Ethiopia, it became the officers barracks during the Italian Occupation. After the liberation of Addis Abeba the Palace fell of favor and the west wing was split and rented out to businesses, Baro Hotel which occupied a smaller part of the West Wing was featured in the movie Running Against the Wind

== Amenities and features ==
The original hotel offered a mix of budget-friendly rooms with air conditioning, desks, and internet access. Additionally, it features on-site restaurant and lounge with live jazz music nightly, laundry service, left luggage storage, and multilingual staff (English and Italian). Located within walking distance of landmarks like Menelik II Square, St. George’s Cathedral, and National Museum of Ethiopia.
