= Istituto Statale Italiano Omnicomprensivo di Addis Abeba =

Addis Ababa school using Italian

Coordinates: 9°02′40″N 38°44′53″E

Location
- Belay Zeleke Street; Arada, Addis Ababa; Ethiopia

Information
- Other name: Scuola Statale Italiana di Addis Abeba
- Established: 1954; 72 years ago
- Staff: 27 (not including teachers)
- Teaching staff: 56
- Website: scuolaitaaddisabeba.esteri.it

Istituto Statale Italiano Omnicomprensivo di Addis Abeba or the Scuola Statale Italiana di Addis Abeba is an Italian governmental international school along Belay Zeleke Street in Arada, Addis Ababa, Ethiopia. Owned by the Italian government, the school has primary, lower secondary, and liceo upper secondary levels.

The school shares its campus with the Italian cultural centre, and the school occupies three buildings. As of 2015 there were 570 students, many of whom were Ethiopians and other non-Italians. There were 44 teachers from Italy, 12 local teachers, and 27 auxiliary personnel.

== History ==
It first opened in the Piazza area in 1954. It moved to its current location in January 1974.
