= Kirkos =

District of Addis Ababa, Ethiopia

Kirkos ቂርቆስ ክፍለ ከተማ
- Sub-city
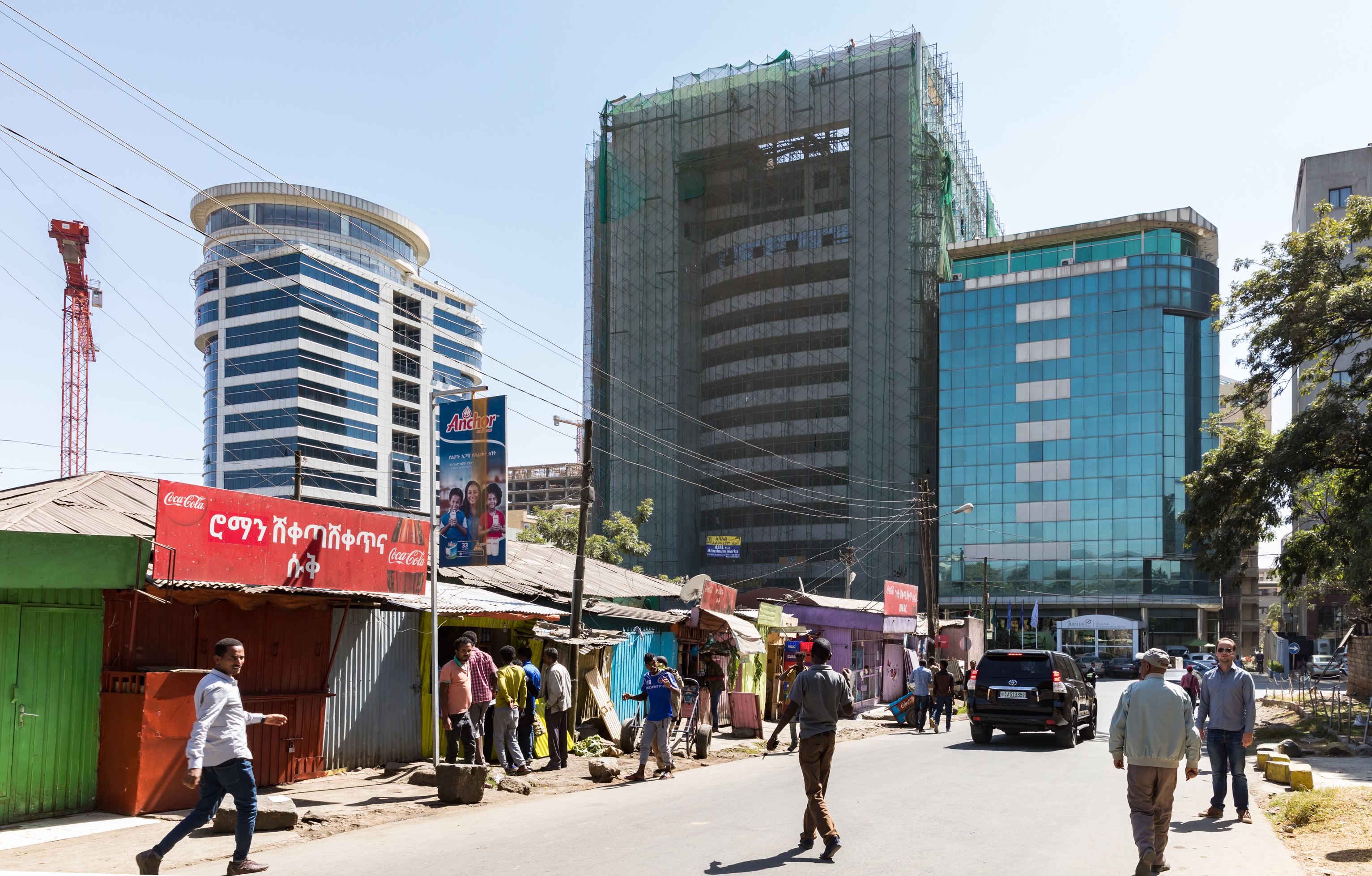

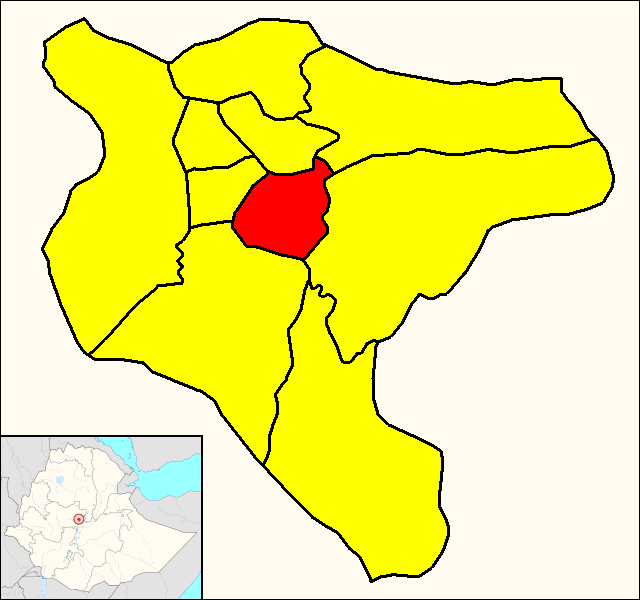
- Kirkos (red) within Addis Ababa

- Location in Ethiopia
- Coordinates: 9°0′15.12″N 38°45′31.28″E
- Country: Ethiopia
- City: Addis Ababa

Area
  - Total: 14.62 km^{2} (5.64 sq mi)

Population (2011)
  - Total: 235,441
  - Density: 16,104/km^{2} (41,710/sq mi)
- Time zone: UTC+3 (East Africa Time)
- Area code: (+251) 11

Kirkos (Amharic: ቂርቆስ ክፍለ ከተማ), also spelled Kerkos, Kirikos or Cherkos, is a district (sub-city) of Addis Ababa, Ethiopia. As of 2011, its population was 235,441.

== Geography ==
The district is located in the city centre, and borders the districts of Arada, Yeka, Bole, Nifas Silk-Lafto and Lideta.

== Education ==
There are many schools in the area. Popular examples include the African Union Branch (Grades 1-8) of Nejashi Ethio-Turkish International Schools, Blue Bird School, and multiple others.

== List of neighbourhoods ==
- Bantyiketu
- Beg Tera
- Beherawi
- Beklo Bet
- Bulgariya Sefer
- Enderase
- Gotera
- Kasanchis
- Kera
- Lancha
- Legehar
- Menaheriya Kasanchis
- Meshualekiya
- Meskel Flower
- Mexico
- Olympia
- Riche
- Sar Bet
- Wello Sefer

== See also ==
- Meskel Square
