= Chaka Project =

Urban planning project in Addis Ababa, Ethiopia since 2022

- Location: Yeka, Addis Ababa, Ethiopia
- Status: Under construction
- Groundbreaking: 21 May 2022

Companies
- Contractor: E-tollo
- Owner: Addis Ababa City Administration

Technical details
- Cost: 500 billion birr
- Size: 503 hectare

Chaka Project (Amharic: ጫካ ፕሮጀክት) is an ongoing urban planning project and part of Addis Ababa City Corridor Project, known as Smart City Project launched on 21 May 2022. The project encompasses the construction of National Palace, residencies, resorts, artificial lake and renovation of forest in Yeka sub-city of Addis Ababa, Ethiopia.

Landed over 503 hectare, the project incorporates roads stretched over 29 km. A contractor named "e-tollo" undertook the construction with 500 billion birr costing, becoming the second high investment project after the Grand Ethiopian Renaissance Dam.

== Description ==
The project was launched on 21 May 2022 to build new National Palace and transform forestry in Yeka sub-city, also known as Chaka which has been headed by the Prime Minister. It has leisure residencies and resort villages. Part of Smart City Project, Chaka Project is the second high-profile project after the construction of Grand Ethiopian Renaissance Dam, costing 500 billion birr.

Landed over 503 hectare, the project interlinked to roads stretched over 29 km, which is under construction with most are nearly completed. Newly featured element includes artificial lake, which is carried out by a contractor named "e-tollo".
