= Nifas Silk-Lafto =

District of Addis Ababa, Ethiopia

Nifas Silk-Lafto ንፋስ ስልክ ላፍቶ ክፍለ ከተማ
- Sub-city
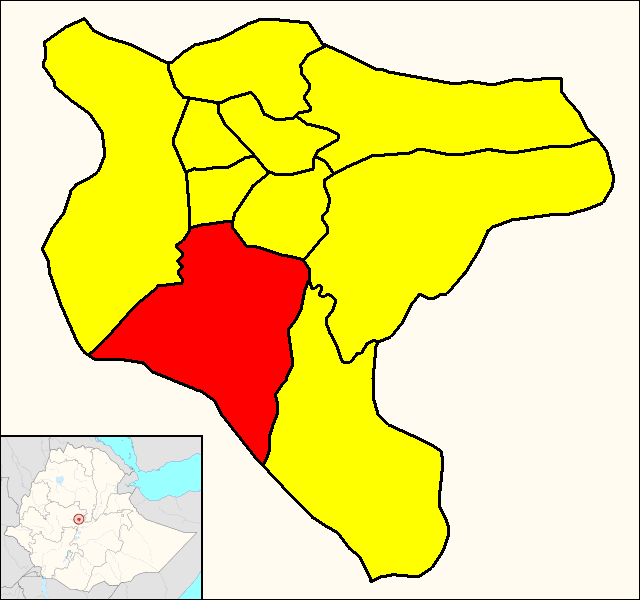
- Nifas Silk-Lafto (red) within Addis Ababa

- Location in Ethiopia
- Coordinates: 8°57′41.76″N 38°43′39″E
- Country: Ethiopia
- City: Addis Ababa

Area
  - Total: 68.30 km^{2} (26.37 sq mi)

Population (2011)
  - Total: 335,740
  - Density: 4,915.7/km^{2} (12,732/sq mi)
- Time zone: UTC+3 (East Africa Time)
- Area code: (+251911966374

Nifas Silk-Lafto, also spelled Niffassilk Lafto or Nefassilk Lafto (Amharic: ንፋስ ስልክ ላፍቶ ክፍለ ከተማ), is a district (sub-city) of Addis Ababa, Ethiopia. As of 2011 its population was of 335,740.

== Geography ==
The district is located in the southwestern suburb of the city. It borders with the districts of Kolfe Keranio, Lideta, Kirkos and Bole and Akaky Kaliti.

== List of places ==
- Jemo Michael
- Jemo 1
- Jemo 3
- Repi
- SOS Children's Village Addis Ababa

=== Admin Level: 11 ===
- Besrat Gebriel
- EECMY Residential Area
- Gofa
- Gofa Mebrathail
- Great Akaki
- Gulele Bota
- Haile Garment
- Hana
- Harbu Shet
- Irtu Bota
- Jemo
- Lafto
- Lebu
- Lebu Mebrathail
- Mekanisa
- Mekanisa Abo
- Menisa
- Vatican
