= Addis Ketema =

District of Addis Ababa, Ethiopia

Addis Ketema አዲስ ከተማ ክፍለ ከተማ
- Sub-city
- Addis Ketema (red) within Addis Ababa

- Location in Ethiopia
- Coordinates: 9°2′2.22″N 38°43′55.81″E
- Country: Ethiopia
- City: Addis Ababa

Area
  - Total: 7.41 km^{2} (2.86 sq mi)

Population (2011)
  - Total: 271,644
  - Density: 36,659.1/km^{2} (94,947/sq mi)
- Time zone: UTC+3 (East Africa Time)
- Area code: (+251) 11

Addis Ketema (Amharic: አዲስ ከተማ or ክፍለ ከተማ, meaning "new city") is a district (sub-city) of Addis Ababa, Ethiopia. As of 2011 its population was 271,664.

== Geography ==
The district is located in the northwestern area of the city, not far from its centre. It borders with the districts of Gullele in the north, Arada in the east, Lideta in the south and Kolfe Keranio in the west. Addis Mercato, Africa's largest open-air marketplace, is in Addis Ketema.

== List of places ==
- Ammanuel Area
- American Gibi
- Ched Tera
- Doro Tera
- Korech Tera
- Mesob Tera
- Minalesh Tera
- Aserasement
- Autobus Tera
- Bomb Tera
- Chid Tera
- District 3
- Dubai Tera
- Ferash Tera
- Goma Tera
- Hadere Sefer
- Kolfe Tiwan
- Mentaf Tera
- Mesalemiya
- Military Tera
- Minalesh Tera
- Quasmeda
- Satin Tera
- Sebategna
- Sehan Tera
- Shanta Tera
- Shekla Tera
- Shema Tera
- Shera Tera
- Worik Tera
