= Addis Mercato =

Marketplace in Addis Ababa, Ethiopia

Coordinates: 9°1′50″N 38°44′20″E

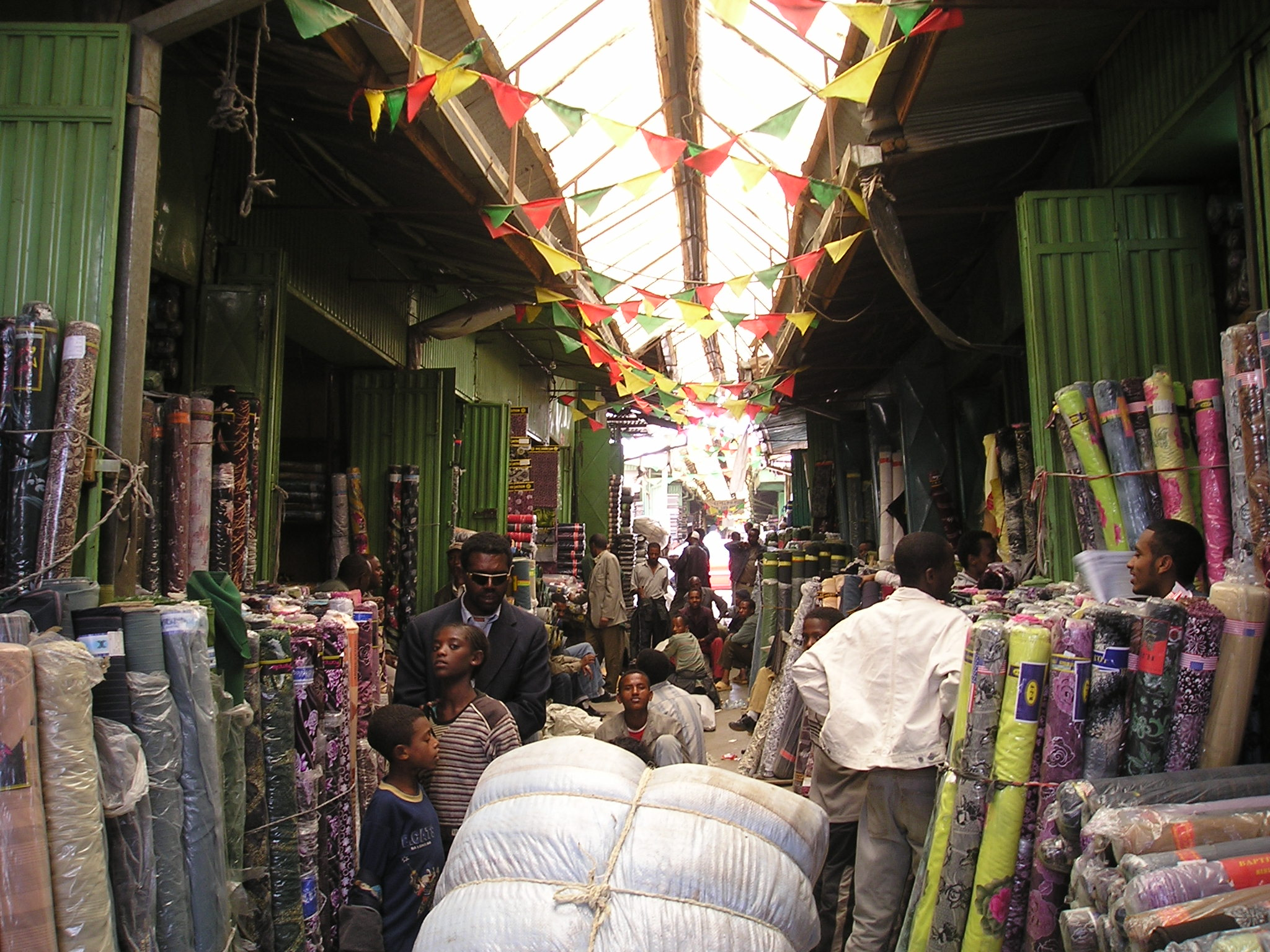
Picture of Mercato in Addis Ababa, 2008

Merkato (Amharic: መርካቶ; Italian: "market") is a large open-air marketplace in the Addis Ketema, district of Addis Ababa, Ethiopia, and the name refers to the neighborhood in which it is located.

== Overview ==
Mercato is the largest open-air market in Africa, covering several square miles and employing an estimated 13,000 people in 7,100 business entities. The primary merchandise passing through the Merkato is locally grown agricultural products — most notably coffee.

Prior to the current Mercato, there was an open marketplace in Addis Ababa near St. George Church at the site where the City Hall stands now, but it ended with the Italian occupation of the 1930s. The occupiers moved the market further west to the area around the premises of Fitawrari Habte Giyorgis Dinagde, which they named Merkato Dinagde. Thus, the present Addis Merkato was founded by the segregationist policies of the Italian occupational government.

Meanwhile, the Italians restricted the historic St. George Merkato to Europeans, renaming it Piazza, which featured European-style shops that displayed commodities through glass windows. The mostly Arab tradesmen who owned stores there eventually relocated a half-mile to the west. Over time, local shopkeepers displaced the Arab merchants and, since the 1960s, the Addis Merkato has had a mostly local flavor. The Mercato Dijino did not have any plan and gradually grew in width and breadth taking different categorical stocks called "terras".

=== Merkato as a tourist spot ===
As of 2024, it is one of the most popular tourist icons for Addis Ababa day tour given its size. The main activities in Merkato are for the local experience. Although it is the largest African open market, it is not a shopping place for tourists. While some sessions such as coffee, spicy and local snacks booths may be relevant to tourists, most of sessions of Merkato are for wholesales including scrap metal recycling session, furniture session and home electronics appliance session.
