= Bole (district of Addis Ababa) =

District of Addis Ababa, Ethiopia

Bole ቦሌ ክፍለ ከተማ
- Sub-city
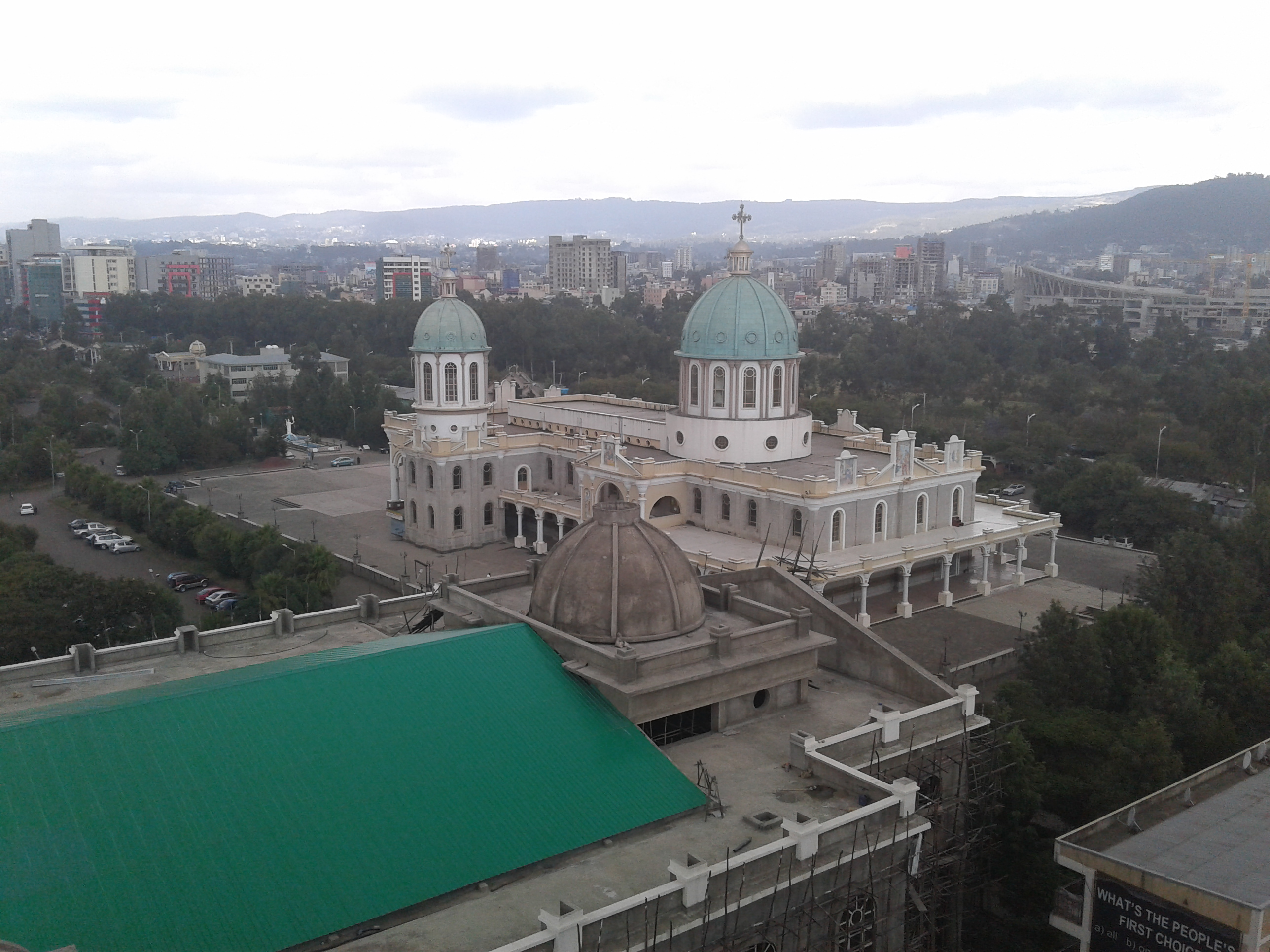
- Bole Medhanealem Church

- Bole (red) within Addis Ababa

- Location in Ethiopia
- Coordinates: 9°0′8.64″N 38°47′59.64″E
- Country: Ethiopia
- City: Addis Ababa

Area
  - Total: 122.08 km^{2} (47.14 sq mi)

Population (2011)
  - Total: 328,900
  - Density: 2,694.1/km^{2} (6,978/sq mi)
- Time zone: UTC+3 (East Africa Time)
- Area code: (+251) 11

Bole (Amharic: ቦሌ ክፍለ ከተማ) is a district (sub-city) of Addis Ababa, Ethiopia. As of 2011 its population was of 328,900.

== Geography ==
The district is located in the southeastern suburb of the city. It borders with the districts of Yeka, Kirkos, Nifas Silk-Lafto and Akaky Kaliti.

== List of places ==
- Bole Arabsa
- Ayat Condominium
- Ayat Zone 2
- Ayat Zone 3
- Ayat Zone 5
- BlockLHS
- BlockRHS
- Chefie Condominium
- Flintstone Homes Condominium
- Jackros Condominium
- Natan Feleke Kibret Residence
- Noah Real Estate

=== Admin Level: 11 ===
- Bole Lemi Industrial Park
- Bole Mikael
- Gerji
- Gewasa
- Ghiliffalegn Stream
- Kotebe
- Kotebe Shet
- Rwanda
- Tafo Shet
- Urael
- Woreda 11 Administrative Office
- Yeka Bole Bota

== See also ==
- Bole International Airport
