= Akaky Kaliti =

District of Addis Ababa, Ethiopia

Akaky Kaliti አቃቂ ቃሊቲ ክፍለ ከተማ
- Sub-city
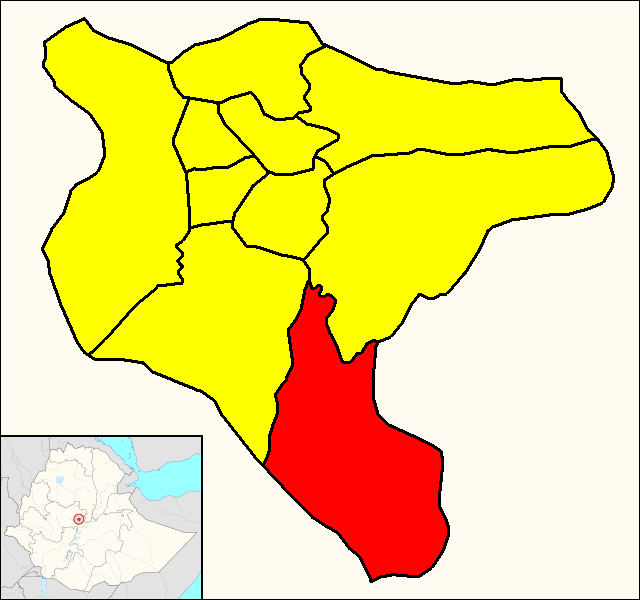
- Akaky Kaliti (red) within Addis Ababa

- Location in Ethiopia
- Coordinates: 8°53′40.92″N 38°46′23.52″E
- Country: Ethiopia
- City: Addis Ababa

Area
  - Total: 118.08 km^{2} (45.59 sq mi)

Population (2011)
  - Total: 195,273
  - Density: 1,653.7/km^{2} (4,283/sq mi)
- Time zone: UTC+3 (East Africa Time)
- Area code: (+251) 11

Akaky Kaliti (Amharic: አቃቂ ቃሊቲ ክፍለ ከተማ), also spelled Akaki Kality, is a district (sub-city) of Addis Ababa, Ethiopia. As of 2011 its population was of 195,273. Formerly, Akaky Kaliti was known as Woreda 26.

Many industries are found in this sub-city of Addis Ababa.

== Geography ==
The district is the southernmost suburb of the city and borders with the districts of Nifas Silk-Lafto and Bole. The towns of Galan and Dukem in the Oromia Special Zone Surrounding Addis Ababa lie to the east along the Addis Ababa–Adama Expressway.

== Notable places ==
- Kaliti Prison, a notorious prison where many journalists are held
- Akaki Stormwater Channel, part of the district's stormwater drainage network

== List of places ==
- Endorro
- Koye

=== Admin Level: 10 ===
- Habitate

=== Admin Level: 1 ===
- Adiss
- Akaki Bota
- Akaki Beseka
- Akaki Kaliti
- Kebena
- Gelan Bota
- Saris
- Saris Abo Area
- Selbane
- Tug Kebena
- Tulu Dimitu
