= Kolfe Keranio =

District of Addis Ababa, Ethiopia

Kolfe Keranio ኮልፌ ቀራኒዮ ክፍለ ከተማ
- Sub-city
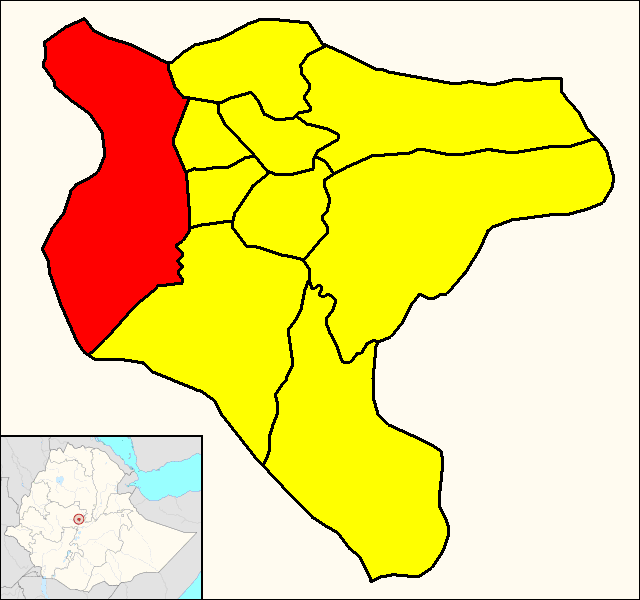
- Kolfe Keranio (red) within Addis Ababa

- Location in Ethiopia
- Coordinates: 9°0′49.75″N 38°42′21.49″E
- Country: Ethiopia
- City: Addis Ababa

Area
  - Total: 61.25 km^{2} (23.65 sq mi)

Population (2011)
  - Total: 546,219
  - Density: 7,448.5/km^{2} (19,292/sq mi)
- Time zone: UTC+3 (East Africa Time)
- Area code: (+251) 11

Kolfe Keranio (Amharic: ኮልፌ ቀራኒዮ ክፍለ ከተማ), also spelled Kolfe Keraneo or simply Kolfe, is a district (sub-city) of Addis Ababa, Ethiopia. As of 2011 its population was 546,219.

== Geography ==
The district is located in the western suburb of the city, near the Gefersa Reservoir. It borders the districts of Gullele, Addis Ketema, Lideta and Nifas Silk-Lafto.

== List of places ==
- Jemo 2
- Mickey Ieland Condo Site
- Repi Upper

=== Admin Level: 11 ===
- Asko Area
- Asko Bercheko Faberika Area
- Atena Tera
- Ayer Tena
- Gebre Kirstos Bete Kristian
- Kolfe Keranio
- Koshim
- Kurtume Stream
- Lekwuanda
- Lideta Gebriel Bete Kristian
- Nefro Neighborhood
- Sost Kuter Mazoria (Total)
- Zenebework
- Asera Sement Mazoria (Asra sement)
