= Statue of Menelik II =

Equestrian statue in Addis Ababa, Ethiopia

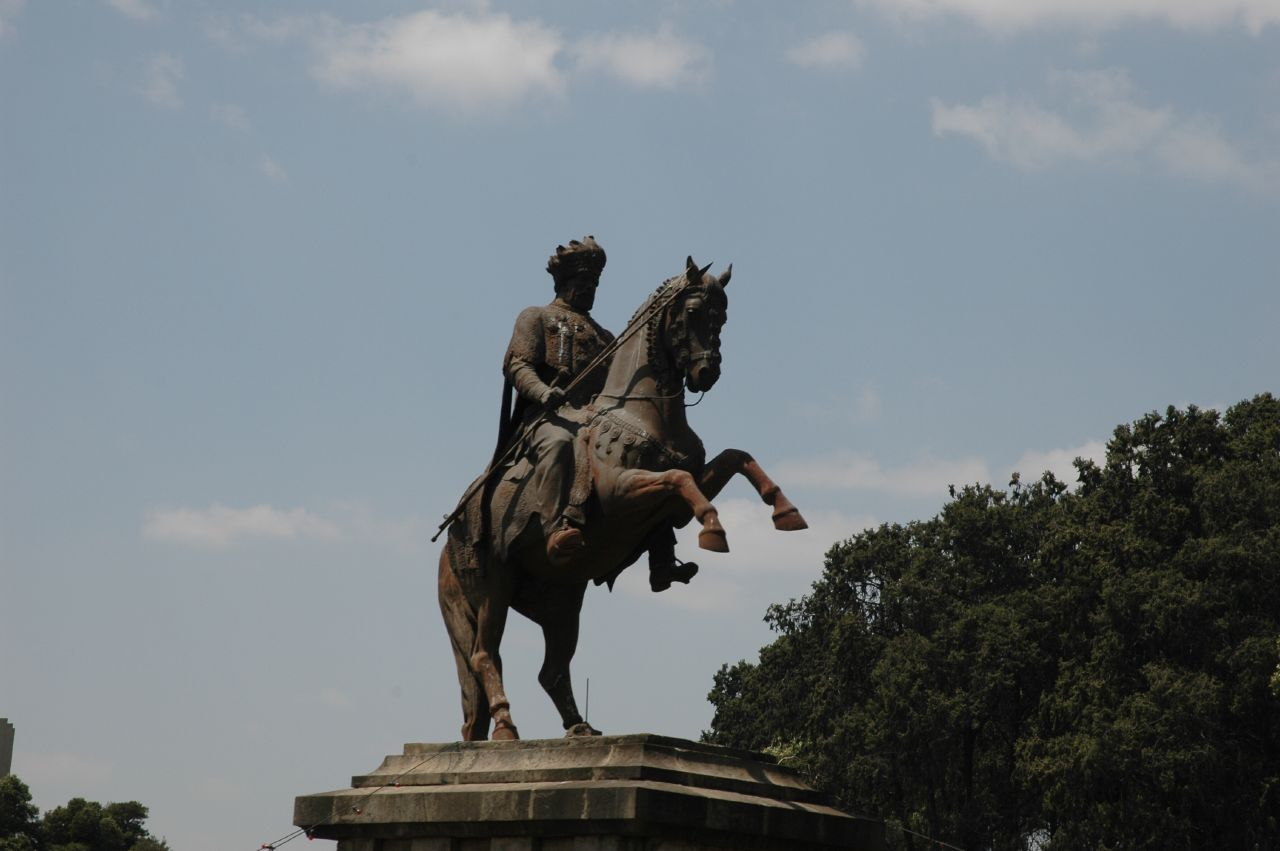
- 9.0358°N 38.7524°E
- Location: Piassa, Arat Kilo, Addis Ababa, Ethiopia
- Designer: Carl Haertel
- Type: Equestrian statue
- Material: Bronze
- Beginning date: 1930
- Opening date: 1931
- Dedicated to: Emperor Menelik II

The Statue of Menelik II is an equestrian statue located near St. George's Cathedral in Addis Ababa, Ethiopia. The statue was erected by Empress Zewditu in 1930 in coincidence of coronation of Ras Tafari, later reigned as Emperor Haile Selassie. The monument depicts Emperor Menelik II sitting in the horse, holding flag of Ethiopia and his sword, symbolizing his ultimate patriotism and grace during the Battle of Adwa (1896). It was sculpted by the German architect Carl Haertel.
