= Arada (district) =

District of Addis Ababa, Ethiopia

Arada አራዳ ክፍለ ከተማ
- Sub-city
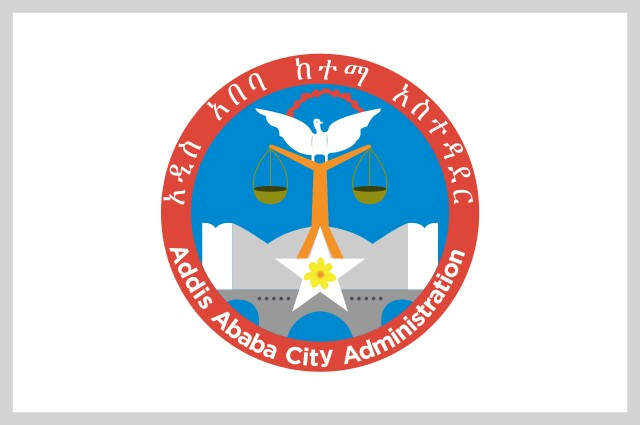
- Flag
- Nickname: City of Humans
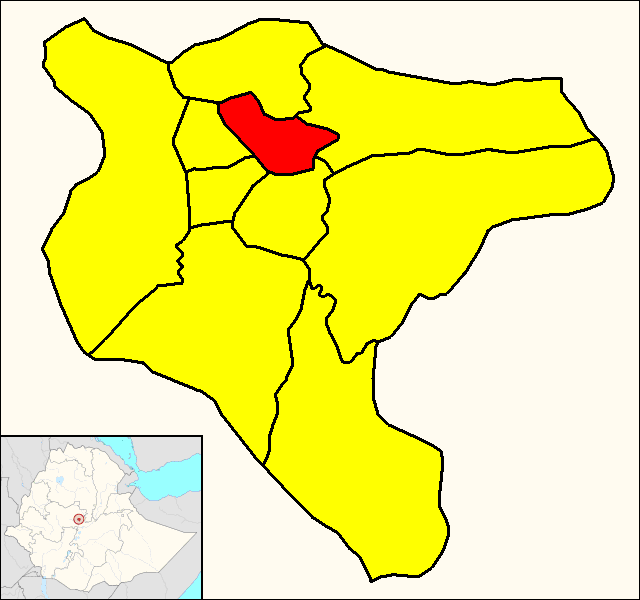
- Arada (red) within Addis Ababa

- Location in Ethiopia
- Country: Ethiopia
- City: Addis Ababa
- Established: 1887

Government
  - Mayor: Adanech Abebe

Area
  - Total: 9.91 km^{2} (3.83 sq mi)
  - Land: 3.826 km^{2} (1.477 sq mi)

Population (2011)
  - Total: 225,999
  - Density: 23,000/km^{2} (60,000/sq mi)
- Time zone: UTC+3 (East Africa Time)
- Area code: (+251) 11

Arada (Amharic: አራዳ ክፍለ ከተማ) is a district (sub-city) of Addis Ababa, Ethiopia. As of 2011, Arada's population was of 226,000. Arada is one of 10 districts of Addis Ababa, the capital of Ethiopia. Arada is a center of culture and education, with numerous schools, cultural establishments and annual cultural events.

== Geography ==
The district is located in the northern area of the city, nearby the centre. It borders with the districts of Gullele, Yeka, Kirkos, Lideta and Addis Ketema. It has an average elevation of nearly 2444m.

== Main sights ==
Arada is known as the center of the old and the new generation artistic, social and urban life style. Its main sights include St. George's Cathedral, the great Menelik II Square, the Hager Fikir Theatre, the Taitu Hotel, Charles de Gaulle Square and many other historical areas and structures.

== Education ==
Public education is free at primary, secondary, and tertiary levels. Overall, Ethiopia has made good progress in education of the years. Istituto Statale Italiano Omnicomprensivo di Addis Abeba, an international school operated by the Italian government, is in Arada. Prominent church affiliated schools like Lideta Catholic Catedral School and Nazareth School also reside in this subcity.

== List of places ==
- Adwa Dildiy Akebabi

=== Admin Level: 11 ===
- Abacoran Sefer
- Ambassador
- Amist Kilo
- Arat Kilo
- Aroge Kera
- Atekelet Tera
- Bias Meberat
- Doro Manekiya
- Enqulal Faberika
- Eri Bekentu
- Gedam Sefer
- Giorgis
- Habte Giorgis
- Piazza
- Posta Bet
- Ras Mekonnen Deldiy
- Sebara Babur
- Shola
- Somali Tera
- Taliyan Sefer
- Webe Berha
- Yohannes

== See also ==
- Yekatit 12 Square
- St. George's Cathedral
