= Yeka =

District of Addis Ababa, Ethiopia

Yeka የካ ክፍለ ከተማ
- Sub-city
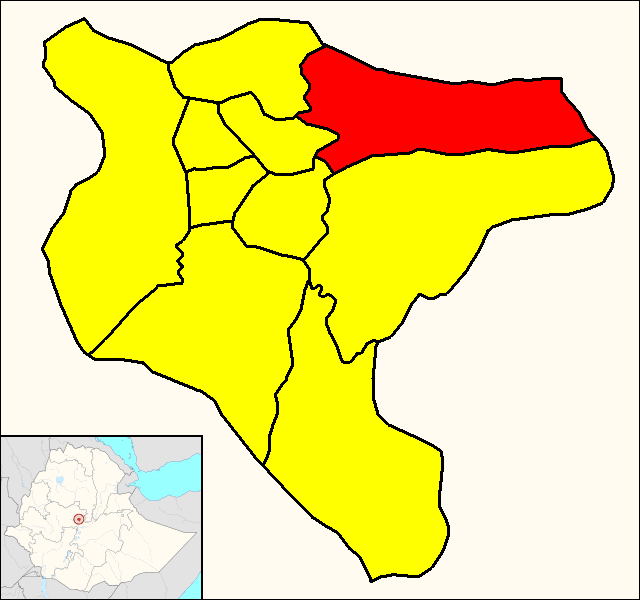
- Yeka (red) within Addis Ababa

- Location in Ethiopia
- Coordinates: 9°2′14.28″N 38°50′6″E
- Country: Ethiopia
- City: Addis Ababa

Population (2016)
  - Total: 424,217
- Time zone: UTC+3 (East Africa Time)
- Area code: (+251) 11

Yeka (Amharic: የካ ክፍለ ከተማ) is a district (sub-city) of Addis Ababa, Ethiopia.

== Geography ==
The district is located in northeastern suburb of the city. It borders with the districts of Gullele, Arada, Kirkos and Bole.

== List of places ==
- Abado Project 13
- Adwa Dildiy Condominium
- Ayat Real Estate Development
- Balderas Condominium
- Signal

=== Admin Level: 11 ===
- Beg Tera
- Kara
- Kara Alo
- Kebena
- Kotebe
- Megenagna
- Sunshine Real Estate
- Yedejazmach Alula Irsha

== Personalities ==
- Girma Wake (born 1943), businessman

== Chaka Project ==
On 21 May 2022, Prime Minister Abiy Ahmed launched a project known as the Chaka Project that aims to clear forest areas and build national palaces, houses, artificial lakes, roads and other infrastructure. Comprising 503 hectares, it is the largest project after the Grand Ethiopian Renaissance Dam (GERD), costing 49 billion ETB funded by the United Arab Emirates. It is now under construction.
