= St. George's Cathedral, Addis Ababa =

Church in Addis Ababa, Ethiopia

Coordinates: 9°02′12″N 38°45′05″E

St. George's Cathedral
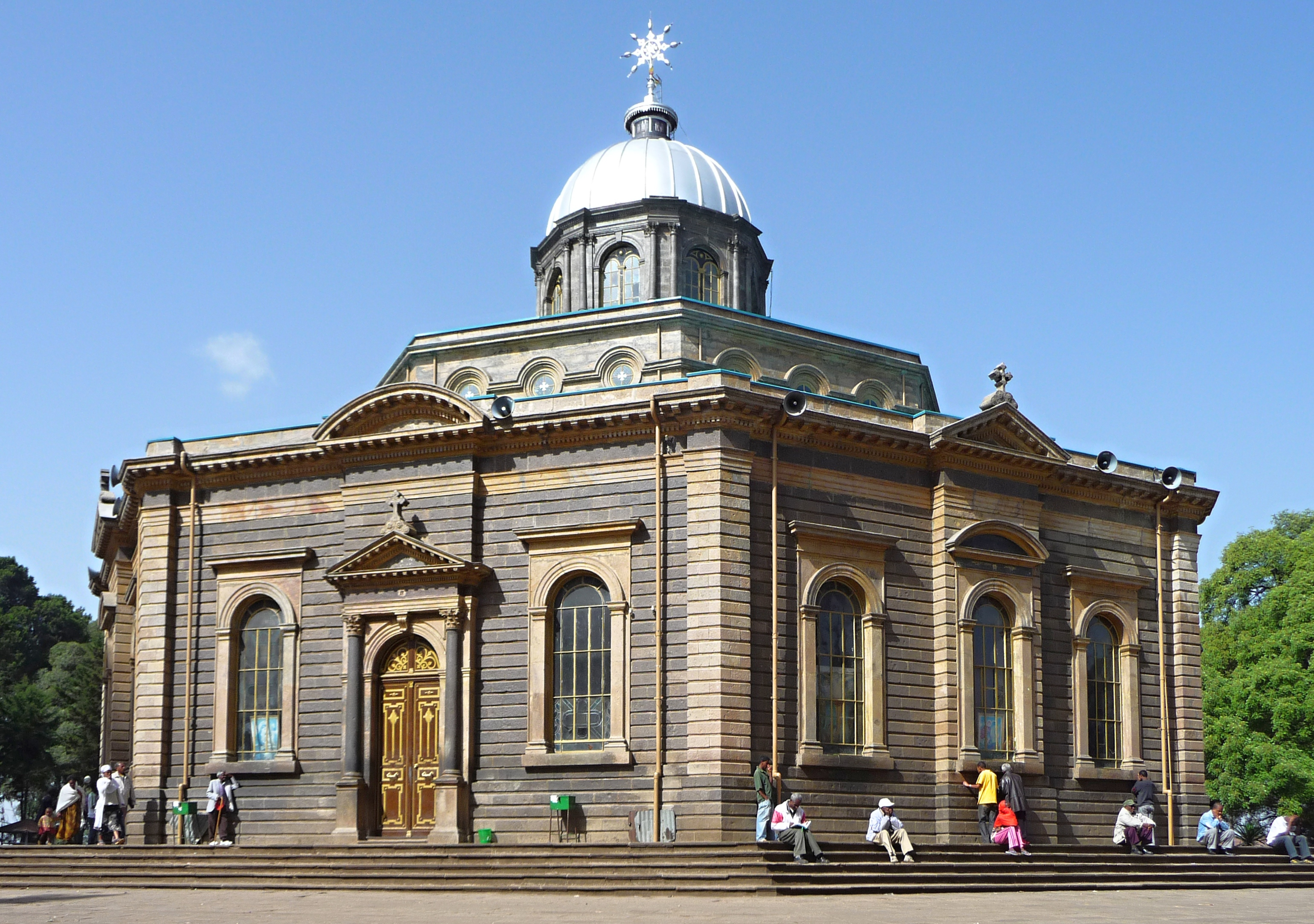
- St. George's Cathedral

Religion
- Affiliation: Ethiopian Orthodox Tewahedo Church
- Rite: Alexandrian Rite
- Ecclesiastical or organisational status: Cathedral
- Status: Active

Location
- Location: Addis Ababa, Ethiopia
- Interactive map of St. George's Cathedral

Architecture
- Type: Church
- Groundbreaking: 19th century

Saint George's Cathedral (Amharic: የቅዱስ ጊዮርጊስ ካቴድራል) is an Ethiopian Orthodox church in Addis Ababa, Ethiopia. The cathedral is noted for its distinctive octagonal form. It is located at the northern end of Churchill Road in the city.

== Overview ==
The new church was built on the ruins of an older church from the 15th century. It was named after St. George, after the Tabot (Ark) of the church was carried to the Battle of Adwa against the Italians during which the Ethiopians secured victory.

The building was designed and built by the Italian engineer Sebastiano Castagna in 1911. Empress Zewditu was crowned at this Cathedral in 1917, and Emperor Haile Selassie was crowned there in 1930, and it became a pilgrimage site for Rastafarians. The Cathedral has a museum, and an Imperial throne is on display as is the stained glass works of artist Afewerk Tekle. Given the reason why the cathedral was named, it displays weaponry used in the wars against the Italians including curved swords and tridents and giant helmets made from the manes of lions.

The building was described in 1938 in an Italian tourist publication as a fine example of the European interpretation of Ethiopian church design. The Italian Fascist authorities set the building on fire in 1937. The cathedral was later restored by Emperor Haile Selassie following the liberation in 1941.
